= Tesseradecads =

Text or genealogy grouping

Tesseradecads are symmetrical arrangements of texts and genealogies into groups of fourteen. Tesseradecads were common Jewish customs. An example is the genealogy of Jesus Christ in the Christian Bible's book of Luke and in the book of Matthew. Some names in the lineages have been omitted in order to create tesseradecads in both genealogies.

== Matthew genealogy ==
| Abraham to David | Abraham; Isaac; Jacob; Judah; Perez; Hezron; Aram; Amminadab; Nahshon; Salmon; Boaz; Obed; Jesse; David |

| David to Jeconiah | David; Solomon; Rehoboam; Abijah; Asa; Jehoshaphat; Jehoram; Uzziah; Jotham; Ahaz; Hezekiah; Manasseh; Josiah; Jeconiah |

| Jeconiah to Jesus | Jeconiah; Salathiel; Zerubbabel; Abihud; Eliakim; Azor; Zadok; Achim; Eliud; Eleazar; Matthan; Jacob; Joseph; Jesus |
