= Luke 3 =

- ← chapter 2 chapter 4 →
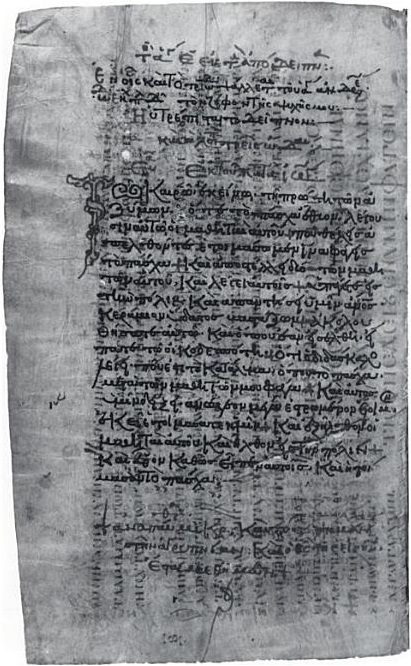
- Luke 3:7–8 with commentary in majuscule on the underwriting of Codex Zacynthius, a palimpsest from 7th-century. The upper writing is 13th-century minuscule of Matthew 26:39–51.
- Book: Gospel of Luke
- Category: Gospel
- Christian Bible part: New Testament
- Order in the Christian part: 3

Luke 3 is the third chapter of the Gospel of Luke in the New Testament of the Christian Bible, traditionally attributed to Luke the Evangelist, a companion of Paul the Apostle on his missionary journeys. It contains an account of the preaching of John the Baptist as well as a genealogy of Jesus. From the start of this chapter until Luke 9:50, the "shape and outlook" of Luke's Gospel follow closely those of the other synoptic gospels, Matthew and Mark. The Expositor's Greek Testament states that in this chapter "the ministry of the new era opens".

== Text ==
The original text was written in Koine Greek and is divided into 38 verses.

=== Textual witnesses ===
Some early manuscripts containing the text of this chapter are:

- Papyrus 4 (AD 150–175; extant verses: 8–38)
- Papyrus 75 (175–225; extant: verses 18–38)
- Codex Vaticanus (325–350)
- Codex Sinaiticus (330–360)
- Codex Bezae (~400)
- Codex Washingtonianus (~400)
- Codex Alexandrinus (400–440)
- Codex Ephraemi Rescriptus (~450; extant verses 21–38)

=== Old Testament references ===
- Luke 3:4–6: Isaiah 40:3–5

== John the Baptist ==
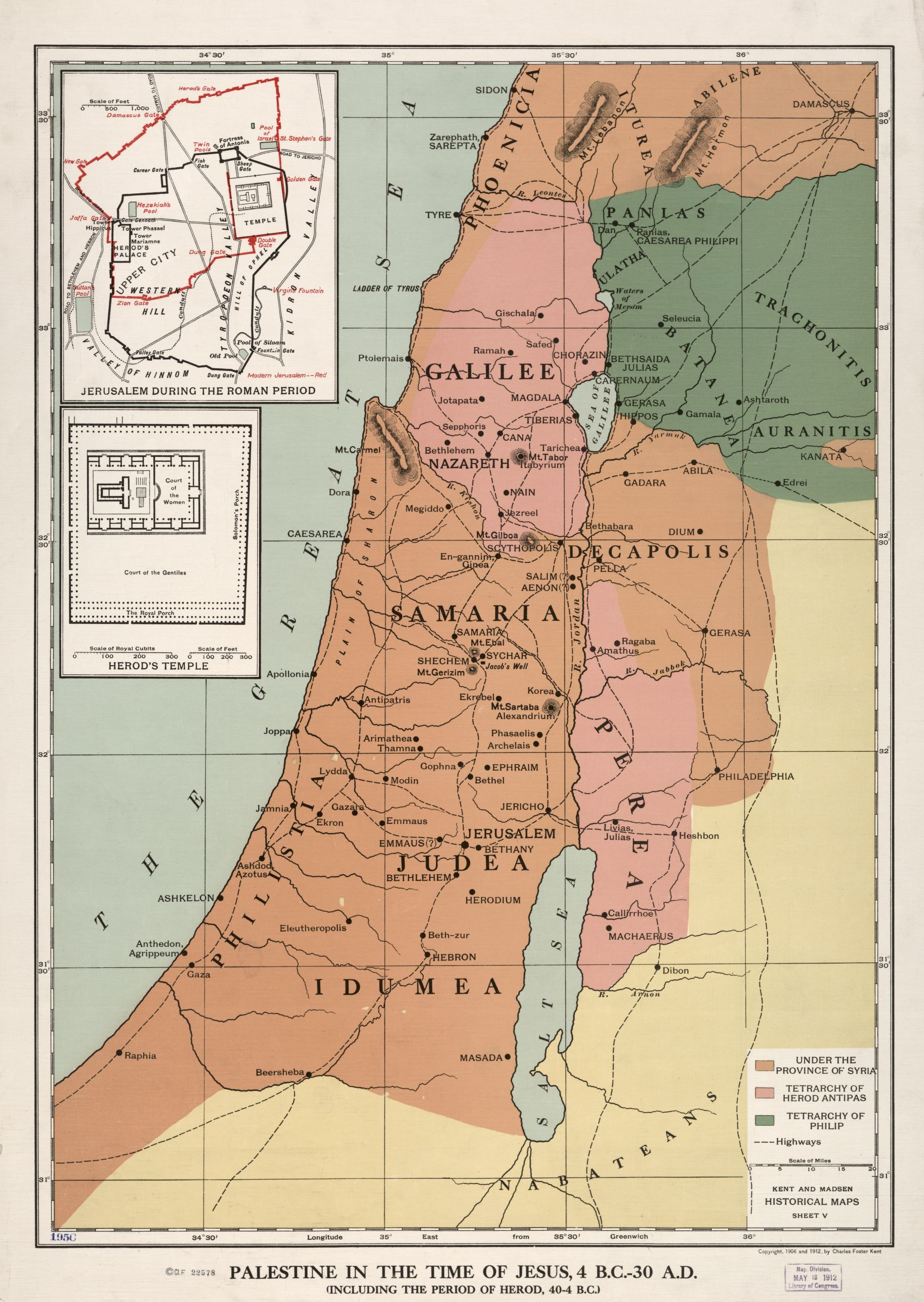
Territories and tetrarchies in the first-century Palestine: Judea, Galilee, Iturea, Trachonitis, Abilene; also Perea, Nabatea, Idumea, Samaria, Decapolis, Chalcis, Phoenicia

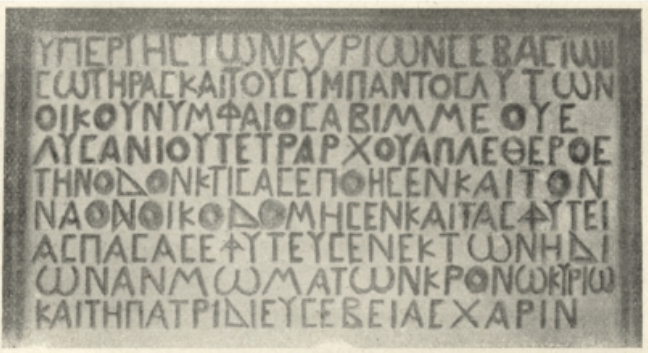
Greek inscription mentioning Lysanias, possibly the tetrarch in Luke 3:1

As he has already done in the first two chapters, Luke provides several points of historical data, in this case six, to specify the date of the events in the first century CE.

=== Verses 1–2 ===
^{1}In the fifteenth year of the reign of Tiberius Caesar — when Pontius Pilate was governor of Judea, Herod tetrarch of Galilee, his brother Philip tetrarch of Iturea and Trachonitis, and Lysanias tetrarch of Abilene — ^{2}during the high priesthood of Annas and Caiaphas, the word of God came to John son of Zechariah in the desert.

Tiberius' fifteenth year of rule was AD 29 or 30 (calculated from the death of his predecessor, Augustus, in AD 14), so one can date the start of John's preaching to then. New Testament scholar William Ramsay suggests that the year was AD 26, calculated from the time Tiberius was appointed as co-Princeps with Augustus in AD 12. Ramsay notes that this manner of calculation could be "made under an Emperor whose years were reckoned from his association as colleague", such as employed by Titus, whose reign began from his association with his father on July 1, AD 71.

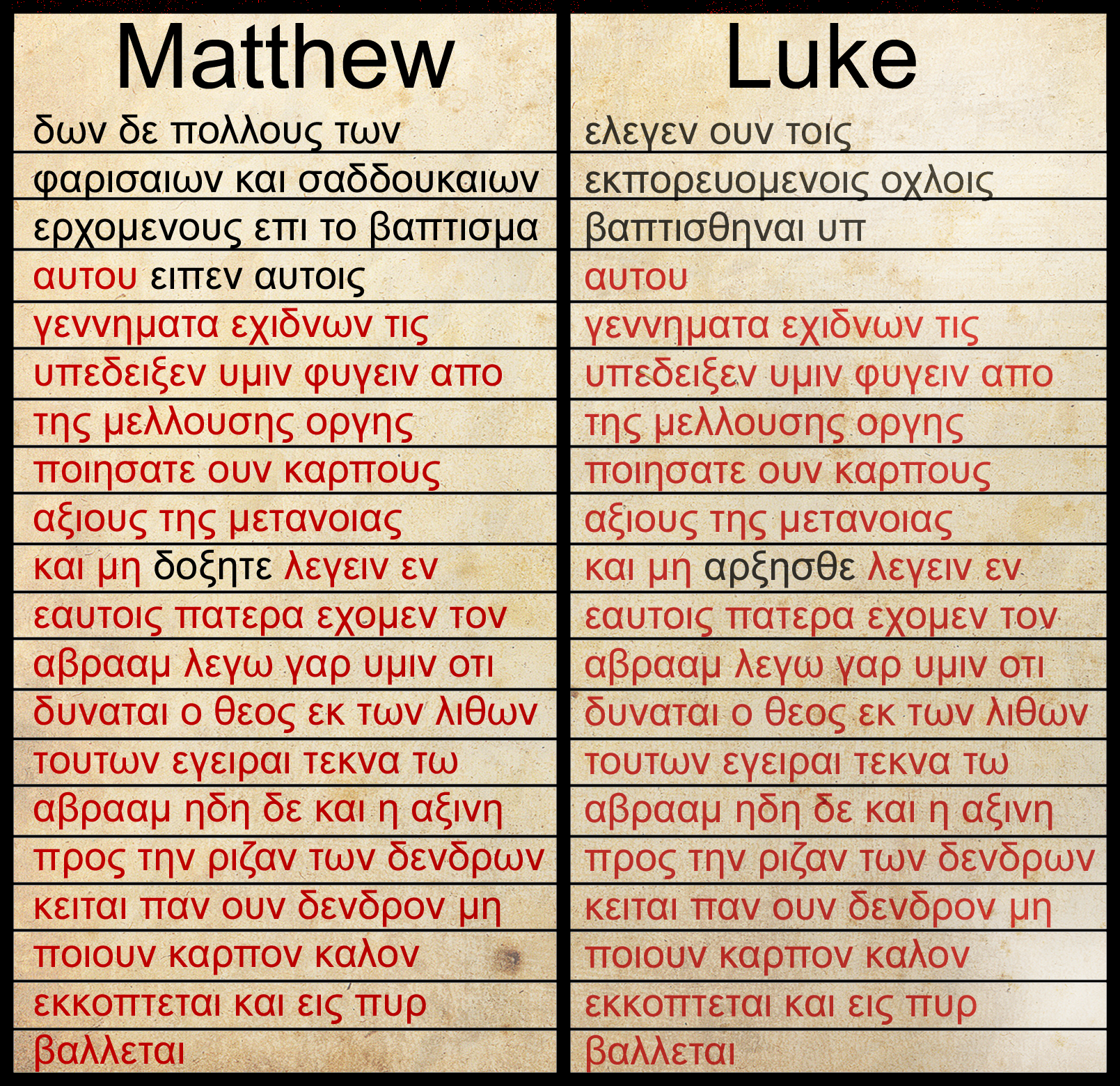
Comparison of Matthew 3:7–10 and Luke 3:7–9. Common text highlighted in red. From Scrivener's posthumous 1894 New Testament.

The rule of Pontius Pilate in Judea during the reign of Tiberius is well attested in history (for example, Tacitus in Annals book 15, chapter 44, written c. AD 116). Saint Gregory suggested that the reference to Roman and Jewish rulers anticipated the salvation of "some from among the Jews and many among the gentiles". Reference to the high priesthoods of Annas and Caiaphas creates a difficulty in that a joint high priesthood was not permitted under Jewish law.

=== Verse 3 ===
And he went into all the region around the Jordan, proclaiming a baptism of repentance for the forgiveness of sins.

Although the message from God had come to John "in the wilderness", he may have preached nearer to Jericho, cf: Luke 1:80: "he was in the wilderness until the day of his public appearance to Israel". Eric Franklin states that the connection between John's baptism of repentance and [God's] forgiveness of sins is that baptism "issues in" forgiveness. Luke connects the same concepts in Acts 2:38 and 22:16.

=== Verse 4 ===
As it is written in the book of the words of Isaiah the prophet, saying:

"The voice of one crying in the wilderness:

'Prepare the way of the Lord;
make His paths straight.

- Citing Isaiah 40:3; also cited in Matthew 3:3, Mark 1:3, and John 1:23.
- "Wilderness": or "desert"; the syntactic position of the phrase "in the wilderness" could be with "Prepare a way" (Masoretic Text or "MT"), suggesting the place where the preparation should be done, while the Greek Septuagint (or "LXX") connects it to "a voice shouting" indicating the place from where John’s ministry went forth. Jewish documents separately support both renderings: 1QS 8:14 and 9.19–20 support the MT version while some rabbinic texts support the LXX version, but in the final analysis, the 'net effect between the two choices may be minimal'.

Like Mark 1:2–3, Matthew 3:3 and John 1:23, Luke quotes Isaiah 40 in reference to John, but at greater length, (Note: Luke uses Isaiah 40:3–5, whereas Matthew 3:3 and Mark 1:3 quote Isaiah 40:3 only.) possibly in order to include the message that "...all flesh (or all mankind) will see God's salvation" (Luke 3:6) for his Gentile audience.

=== Verse 5 ===
Every valley shall be filled,

and every mountain and hill shall be brought low;

and the crooked shall be made straight,

and the rough ways shall be made smooth;

This verse cites Isaiah 40:4, which the King James Version translates as "every valley shall be exalted". The writer Frederic Farrar notes "a remarkable parallel" in Josephus' description of the march of Vespasian in the Wars of the Jews:

where he ... says that among his vanguard were "such as were to make the road even and straight, and if it were anywhere rough and hard to be passed over, to plane it, and to cut down the woods that hindered their march ... that the army might not be tired".

=== Verse 6 ===
And all flesh shall see the salvation of God.

This verse cites Isaiah 40:5: see note above on verse 4.

=== Verses 7–17 ===
John first exhorts the listeners ("brood of snakes") to prove their repentance by the way they lived. Their sincerity was being called into question. As John continues to preach a baptism of repentance, he then tells the crowds that their descent from Abraham will not save them from "the wrath to come", that "...out of these stones God can raise up children for Abraham. The axe is already at the root of the trees, and every tree that does not produce good fruit will be cut down and thrown into the fire." (8–9)

The people ask what they should do and John speaks of sharing (verse 11). Specifically to tax collectors (publicans in the King James Version), and to soldiers he says that they should not abuse their positions, adding that soldiers should be "content with their pay". Heinrich Meyer is confident that Jewish soldiers are referred to here, rather than occupying Roman forces. They ask him if he is the Christ, and he replies "I baptize you with water. But one more powerful than I will come, the thongs of whose sandals I am not worthy to untie. He will baptize you with the Holy Spirit and with fire." (Luke 3:16) also found in Matthew 3:11, Mark 1:7-8 and John 1:26–27. John is then locked up by Herod for rebuking him about his wife Herodias, Herod adding this "crowning iniquity" to all his other misdeeds.

==== Verse 16 ====
John answered, saying to all, “I indeed baptize you with water; but One mightier than I is coming, whose sandal strap I am not worthy to loose. He will baptize you with the Holy Spirit and fire.

Textual variants are found in a few manuscripts (C D 892 1424 it) which have εἰς μετάνοιαν, eis metanoian, "for repentance", after the phrase "baptize you with water". This addition may be intended for clarification and was probably an attempt to harmonize with Matthew 3:11.

== Jesus's baptism ==
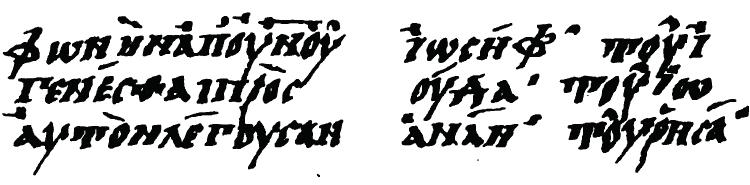
Facsimile edition of Luke 3:22,26–27 of Codex Tischendorfianus III, from 8th or 10th century

Luke then tells us (verse 21) that Jesus was one of the many who were baptised by John. Meyer reads the text as meaning that whilst the assembled people were being baptised, Jesus was also baptised. Nicoll argues that use of the aorist "ought to imply that the bulk of the people had already been baptised before Jesus appeared on the scene, i.e., that John's ministry was drawing to its close", cf. the wording of the Good News Translation, After all the people had been baptized, Jesus also was baptized.

The Holy Spirit appears in bodily form like a dove and tells him "You are my Son, whom I love; with you I am well pleased" (cf. Matthew 3:13–17, Mark 1:9–11, John 1:32–34).

=== Verse 23 ===
^{a}And Jesus himself began to be about thirty years of age,
^{b}being (as was supposed) the son of Joseph, which was the son of Heli,

The King James Version's wording is "ungrammatical, a strange expression". Many translations insert reference to his "work" or his "ministry". Luke does not state how many years John baptised for, but this is when most date the start of Jesus's ministry, 29 or 30. He had to be more than thirty years old, as he was born about six months before Jesus was born, as noted in Luke 1. Most probably John was born in 4 BC.

== The ancestry of Jesus ==
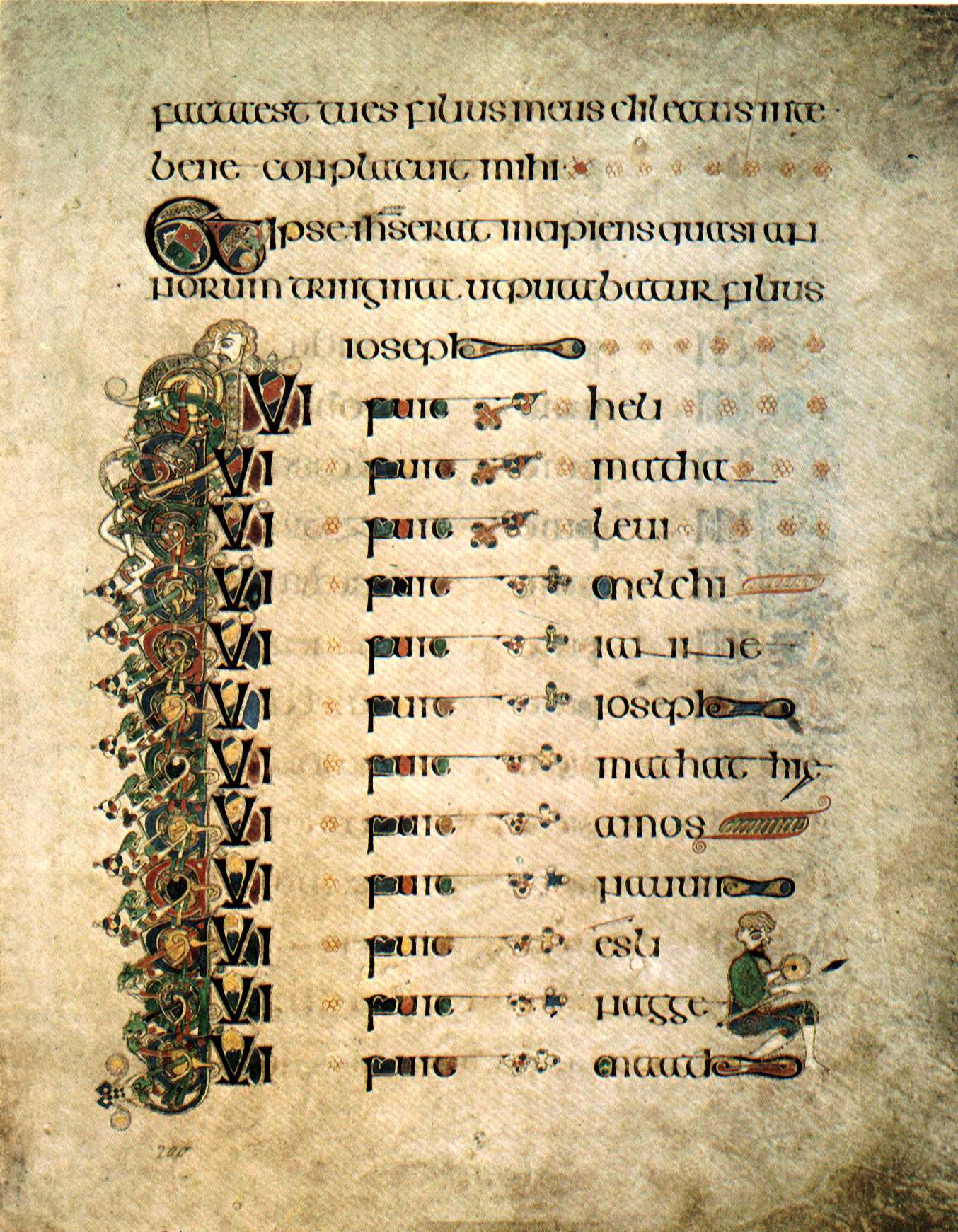
A part of Luke's genealogy of Jesus (Luke 3:23–26), from the Book of Kells, transcribed by Celtic monks c. 800

=== Verses 23b–38 ===
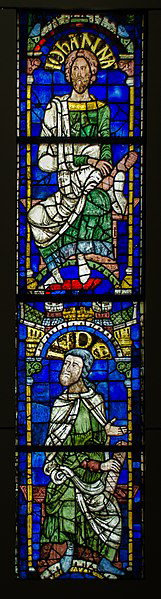
One of Christ's ancestors depicted in Canterbury Cathedral

Luke sets out here, like Matthew in his opening chapter, a genealogy of Jesus. Luke starts with his legal father Joseph and lists 73 people between Joseph and Adam, who Luke says is "...the Son of God", thus having 75 people between God and Jesus. This genealogy is longer than Matthew's, works retrospectively from Jesus back to Adam, (whereas Matthew's runs chronologically forward from Abraham to Jesus), and has a number of other differences. Luke names Joseph's father and thus Jesus's grandfather as Heli, which could be Mary's father, as noted in the Talmud. On the other hand, Matthew records the name of Joseph's father was Jacob. They then say that Jesus's great grandfather was named Matthat or Matthan, who could be the same person or, as first suggested by Julius Africanus, brothers. The lists then diverge from there, coming together again at David. The list in Luke also differs from Genesis 11:12, which says that Arphaxad was Selah's father, not his grandfather through Cainan.

Patrilineage of Jesus according to Luke
1. God; 2. Adam; 3. Seth; 4. Enos; 5. Cainan; 6. Maleleel; 7. Jared; 8. Enoch; 9. Mathusala; 10. Lamech; 11. Noah; 12. Shem; 13. Arphaxad; 14. Cainan	15. Sala; 16. Heber; 17. Phalec; 18. Ragau; 19. Saruch; 20. Nachor; 21. Thara; 22. Abraham; 23. Isaac; 24. Jacob; 25. Juda; 26. Phares; 27. Esrom; 28. Aram	29. Aminadab; 30. Naasson; 31. Salmon; 32. Boaz; 33. Obed; 34. Jesse; 35. David; 36. Nathan; 37. Mattatha; 38. Menan; 39. Melea; 40. Eliakim; 41. Jonam; 42. Joseph	43. Judah; 44. Simeon; 45. Levi; 46. Matthat; 47. Jorim; 48. Eliezer; 49. Jose; 50. Er; 51. Elmodam; 52. Cosam; 53. Addi; 54. Melchi; 55. Neri; 56. Salathiel	57. Zorobabel; 58. Rhesa; 59. Joannan; 60. Juda; 61. Joseph; 62. Semei; 63. Mattathias; 64. Maath; 65. Nagge; 66. Esli; 67. Naum; 68. Amos; 69. Mattathias; 70. Joseph	71. Jannai; 72. Melchi; 73. Levi; 74. Matthat; 75. Heli; 76. Joseph; 77. Jesus

=== Verse 33 ===
Which was the son of Aminadab, which was the son of Aram, which was the son of Esrom, which was the son of Phares, which was the son of Juda.

Parallel verses: Matthew 1:3–4

=== Verse 38 ===
... the son of Enosh, the son of Seth, the son of Adam, the son of God.

As throughout Luke's genealogy, "son of" is implied but not stated except for "the son of Joseph" in verse 23. (Note: See italicisation in NKJV: Luke 3:23–38, from "the son of Heli" onwards.) Methodist commentator Joseph Benson comments,

Adam, being descended from no human parents, but formed by the power of a divine creating hand, might with peculiar propriety be called the son of God, having, in his original state, received immediately from God, whatever the sons of Adam receive from their parents, sin and misery excepted.

Paul makes reference to the Greek understanding that "we are [all] the offspring of God" in his speech in the Areopagus in Athens, Acts 17:28–29.

== See also ==
- Date of birth of Jesus
- Genealogy of Jesus
- John the Baptist
- Messianic prophecies of Jesus
- Related Bible parts: Genesis 5, Genesis 49, Numbers 27, Numbers 36, Isaiah 40, Isaiah 42, Zechariah 12, Matthew 1, Matthew 3, Mark 1, John 1

== Sources ==
- Brown, Raymond E., An Introduction to the New Testament, Doubleday 1997 ISBN 0-385-24767-2
- Ramsay, W. M., St Paul the Traveller and the Roman Citizen (1895; German translation, 1898)

Preceded by Luke 2	Chapters of the Bible; Gospel of Luke	Succeeded by Luke 4
