= Azor (biblical figure) =

Character in New Testament

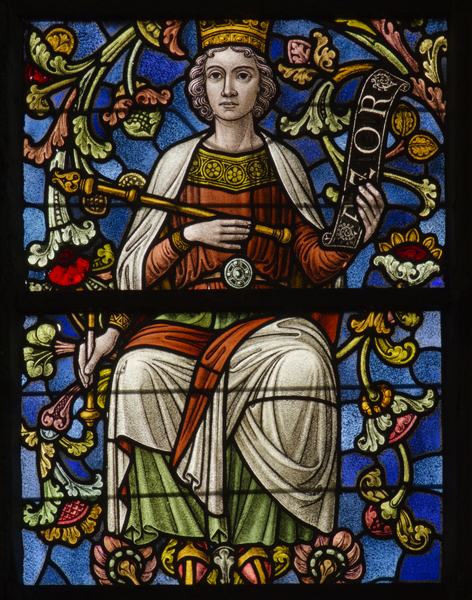
- Azor in stained glass window: The Tree of Jesse, 1934 (detail), by Gustave Ladon. North transept, Church of Our Lady of Pamele, Oudenaarde, East Flanders, Belgium

Patrilineal ancestor of Jesus
- Died: Traditionally c.372 BC
- Venerated in: Eastern Orthodox Church; Eastern Catholic Churches; Byzantine Catholic Church
- Canonized: Pre-congregation
- Feast: Feast of the Holy Fathers: Sunday before the feast of the Nativity, falling 18−24 December (together with the other ancestors of Jesus)

Azor (Hebrew: אָזוֹר, 'helper'; Ancient Greek: Ἀζώρ, Azór), according to a New Testament gospel narrative in Matthew 1:13 and 1:14, was an ancestor of Jesus. He is mentioned as the son of Eliakim and the great-grandson of Zerubbabel; he is the father of Zadok. By this account he is of the Davidic line. (Note: Matthew 1:13−14)

== In the Bible ==
According to the Gospel of Matthew, Azor was the son of Eliakim and the father of Zadok from the patriarchal tribe of Judah. He is not mentioned anywhere in the Old Testament as a descendant of Zerubbabel, nor through any son by the name Abiud. That name does not appear in the Old Testament either. However, Abiud is possibly intended to be Obadiah, the son of Arnan, who is mentioned in the first Book of Chronicles (1 Chronicles 3:21). (Note: 1 Chronicles 3:21)

Some biblical scholars see Matthew's genealogy as theologically or symbolically—rather than historically—motivated. In this view, by alluding to names from the lineage of the tribe of Levi in his genealogy, Matthew intended to unite the priestly and the royal lines of Israel in Jesus. (Note: See also: Hebrews 4:14−16)

According to the biblical scholar Robert H. Gundry, Azor's name could be a shortened form of Azariah, a name usually used for the ecclesiastic descent of Levi. Zariah is Zadok, his son. Abihud (or Abiud), Azor's grandfather is similar to the name Abihu, a priest from the tribe of Levi. The name Abihu means "Son of Judah" that can refer to the lineage of Abihud given by Matthew. Gundry speculates that Matthew slightly modifies the name due to its appositeness in the genealogy that he gives. Abiud's son Eliakim may refer to Eliezer who later succeeded Abihu as priest after his murder.

Traditionally, Zerubbabel's period starts at 539 BC, while Azor, the third generation after Zerubbabel's, is said to have died in 372 BC. This long period of time for four individuals make scholars feel an accurate list would bear more generations. However, Luke's genealogy covers more names in this period and replaces the name Azor to Judah as the third generation from Zerubbabel. The lacking of papponymic of generations in the Babylonian Period of Matthew's account leads some scholars like William F. Albright to speculate that over the generations the repeating and similar names were merged.

== Veneration ==
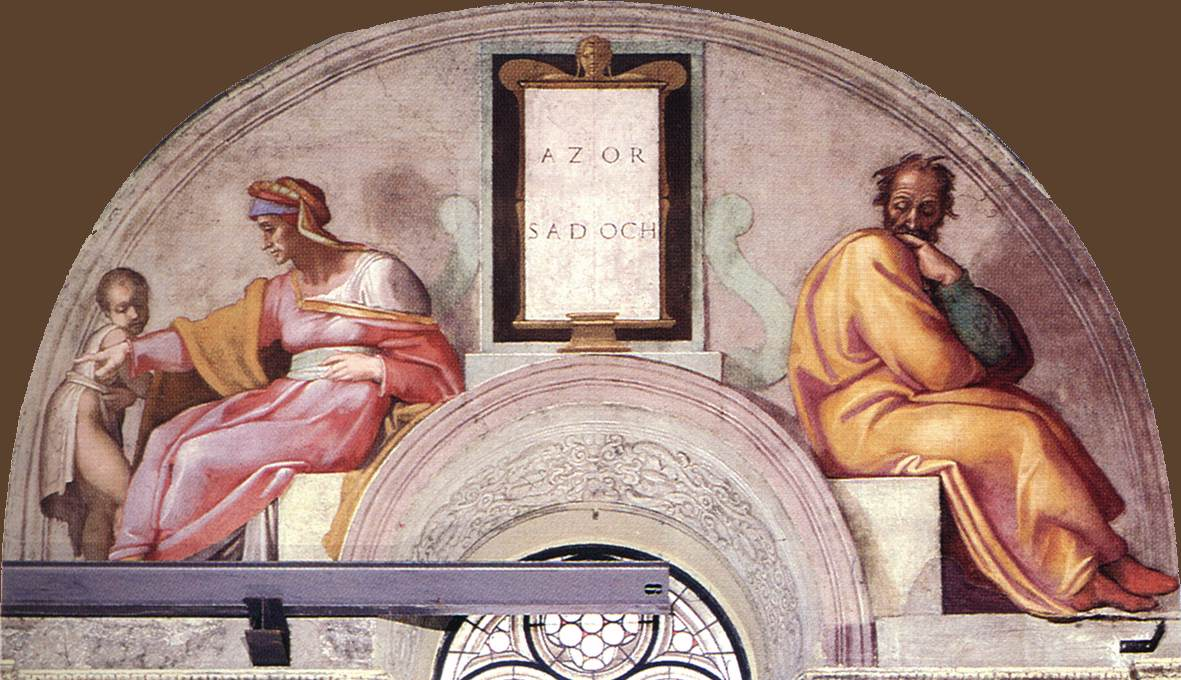
Lunette in the Sistine Chapel of Azor with Zadok his son

Azor is portrayed in many churches in stained-glass windows and lunettes within representations of the lineage of Jesus, from Abraham, and down, through David. One of the most prominent is Michelangelo's depiction of Azor and Sadoch, found in the Sistine Chapel.

Azor is recognised as a saint by churches of Eastern Christianity and is celebrated during the Sunday of the Holy Fathers, (Note: Not to be confused with the Feast of the Forefathers, which honours all those Old Testament figures who are believed to have been faithfully waiting for the coming of the Christ. The feast of the Forefathers is held two Sundays before the feast of the Nativity, between 11 and 17 December.) which is the Sunday immediately before the Nativity (Christmas), between 18 and 24 December.

== Genealogy in Matthew ==
The following are according to Matthew 1:1-17: (Note: Matthew 1:1–17)

Patrilineage of Jesus according to Matthew
1. Abraham; 2. Isaac; 3. Jacob; 4. Judah and Tamar; 5. Pharez; 6. Esrom; 7. Aram; 8. Aminadab; 9. Naasson; 10. Salmon and Rahab; 11. Boaz and Ruth; 12. Obed; 13. Jesse; 14. David and Bathsheba	15. Solomon; 16. Roboam; 17. Abias; 18. Asaph; 19. Josafat; 20. Joram; 21. Ozias; 22. Jotham; 23. Achaz; 24. Ezechias; 25. Manasses; 26. Amos; 27. Josias; 28. Jechonias	29. Salathiel; 30. Zorobabel; 31. Abiud; 32. Eliakim; 33. Azor; 34. Sadoc; 35. Achim; 36. Eliud; 37. Eleazar; 38. Matthan; 39. Jacob; 40. Joseph; 41. Jesus

=== Speculative genealogy ===
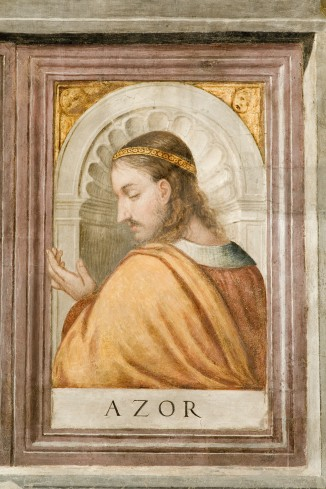
Portrait of Azor by Girolamo Tessari in Padova, Church Of S Francisco

Book of Adam and Eve mentions that Azor's wife was named Lebaidah, the daughter of the High Priest Jehoiada II a descendant of Joshua the High Priest. Because of that claim, Jesus could have came from the tribe of Levi and can actually perform the duty of a High Priest of Israel. Azor's father Eliakim is said to have married a woman by the name of Hazibah (Kwebedai), the daughter of Aram, while his son Zadok married Kalim or Kaltimi, the daughter of Waikan.

== Citations ==
Preceded by Eliakim	Matthew's Ancestry of Jesus	Succeeded by Zadok or Sadoc
