= Nathan (son of David) =

- Prince of Israel
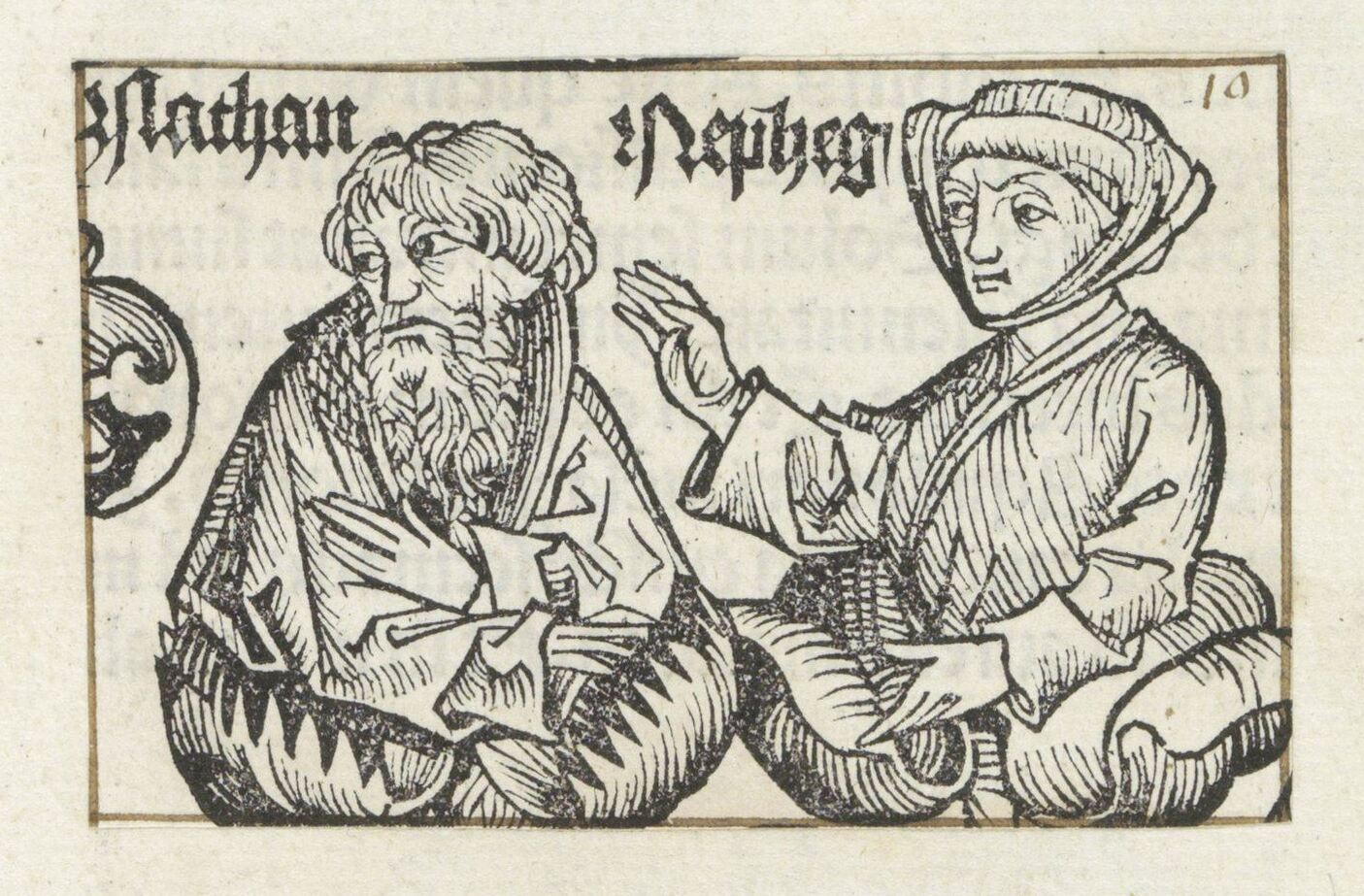
- Nathan and his brother Nepheg depicted by Hartmann Schedel in his book Nuremberg Chronicles (1493)
- Issue: Mattatha
- House: Davidic
- Father: David
- Mother: Bathsheba
- Religion: Yahwist

Nathan (Hebrew: נתן, Modern: Natan, Tiberian: Nāṯān) was the youngest son among four or five children born to King David and Bathsheba in Jerusalem if names were written in order in the Bible (besides Solomon). He was a younger brother of Shammuah (sometimes referred to as Shammua or Shimea) and Shobab, and Solomon who was the second oldest child of Bathsheba. The first son died before he could be named.

== Hebrew Bible ==
Nathan is mentioned as the son of David in 2 Samuel 5:14 and in 1 Chronicles 3:5 and 14:4.

Throughout the Hebrew Bible, Nathan is referred to when listing the sons of David. First in 2 Samuel 5:14, "And these be the names of those that were born to him in Jerusalem; Shammuah, and Shobab, and Nathan, and Solomon,"

In 1 Chronicles 3:5 "And these were born to him in Jerusalem: Shimea, and Shobab, and Nathan, and Solomon, four, of Bathshua the daughter of Ammiel:"

The last specific mention of Nathan appears in 1 Chronicles 14:4 "Now these are the names of his children which he had in Jerusalem; Shammua, and Shobab, Nathan, and Solomon,"

There are also instances in the Hebrew Bible where the name Nathan is mentioned, but it is unknown whether it is referring to Nathan the prophet or Nathan the son of David. One instance of this appears in the first book of the Book of Kings. In 1 Kings 4:5 it states "Azariah son of Nathan—in charge of the district governors;" when listing the chief officials of Israel under the reign of Solomon. The passage does not specify if it is the son of Nathan the prophet or Nathan the son of David.

== New Testament ==
In the New Testament, the genealogy of Jesus according to the Gospel of Luke traces Jesus's lineage back to King David through the line of Nathan, while the Gospel of Matthew traces it through Solomon, the line of Joseph, his legal father. Specifically, in Luke 3:31 the genealogy of Jesus according to Luke, Jesus's lineage connects to Nathan through the biblical figure Heli, the son of Matthat. Meanwhile, the Gospel of Matthew makes no mention of Nathan. Rather, in Matthew 1:16 Jesus's lineage is connected to Jacob which eventually relates Jesus to Solomon rather than Nathan.

One conventional explanation for these differences, from as early as John of Damascus, is that Nathan is the ancestor of the Virgin Mary, while Solomon is the ancestor of Mary's husband Joseph. The blood curse on the line of Jeconiah who was a descendant in the line of Solomon, so the genealogy in Matthew is tainted with a blood curse from Jeconiah all the way to Joseph. No descendant of Jeconiah would qualify as King of Israel.

Another explanation for these differences is yibbum, as offered by John of Damascus: "One ought also to observe this, that the law was that when a man died without seed, this man's brother should take to wife the wife of the dead man and raise up seed to his brother." From this he proposes it is possible that "when Mathan died, Melchi, who was of the lineage of Nathan and the son of Levi and brother of Panther, married the wife of Mathan. It was she who was the mother of Jacob, and from her Melchi begot Heli. Thus, Jacob and Heli were born of the same mother, but Jacob was of the lineage of Solomon, while Heli was of the lineage of Nathan. Heli, however, who was of the lineage of Nathan, died childless, and his brother Jacob, who was of the lineage of Solomon, took his wife and raised up seed for his brother and begot Joseph. So, while Joseph was by nature a son of Jacob of the descent of Solomon, he was by law son of Heli, who was of the line of Nathan."

One other explanation frequently proposed by modern scholars is that biblical genealogy is often based on theology rather than factual history. For example, the title "Son of God" is used frequently. However, this title would not have been used in the earliest Gospel writings. This explains the differences in genealogies, as Matthew and Luke wrote for different audiences.

== Other sons of David ==
Nathan is a son born to David and Bathsheba. The first book of the Books of Chronicles has a passage that states the sons of David born to him in Hebron, before recounting their sons and then nine more sons and one daughter of David who were also born to him in Jerusalem.

1 Chronicles 3:1-4 states
"These were the sons of David born to him in Hebron:
The firstborn was Amnon the son of Ahinoam of Jezreel;
the second, Daniel the son of Abigail of Carmel;
the third, Absalom the son of Maakah daughter of Talmai king of Geshur;
the fourth, Adonijah the son of Haggith;
the fifth, Shephatiah the son of Abital;
and the sixth, Ithream, by his wife Eglah.
These six were born to David in Hebron, where he reigned seven years and six months."

It then lists 4 sons of David and Bathsheba. However we know that their first son died. In 2 Samuel 11 this son is never named. It is therefore possible that he was called Shimea (or Shammua 1 Chronicles 14:4, and 2 Samuel 5:5 ) but equally possible, more likely even, that this is a surviving son, although the Bible does not mention him again. We also know from 2 Samuel 12:24 that Solomon was their second son. Assuming that Solomon is mentioned last as the most important, if the others are listed in order this would make Nathan the fourth or fifth son born by Bathsheba (= Bathshua) and therefore tenth or eleventh of David's sons.

1 Chronicles 3:6-9 recounts the others born in Jerusalem. "There were also Ibhar, Elishua, Eliphelet, Nogah, Nepheg, Japhia, Elishama, Eliada and Eliphelet—nine in all. All these were the sons of David, besides his sons by his concubines. And Tamar was their sister."

This means Nathan is one of David's nineteen (or twenty) legitimate sons.

== See also ==
- Genealogy of Jesus#Explanations for divergence
- Nathan (prophet)
- Related Bible parts: 2 Samuel 5, Zechariah 12, Luke 3
