= List of minor New Testament figures =

This list contains persons named in the Bible in the New Testament of minor notability, about whom either nothing or very little is known, aside from any family connections.

== A ==
=== Abihud ===
Abihud or Abiud was the son of Zerubbabel according to the Gospel of Matthew (Matthew 1:15), although he was not mentioned in the Old Testament as the son of Zerubbabel. He could possibly be the same as Obadiah.

=== Achim ===
Achim also called Akim, was the son of Zadok according to Matthew 1:14 and the father of Eliud.

=== Addi ===
Addi or Addia was the son of Cosam, and the father of Melchi in the Genealogy of Jesus according to St. Luke.

=== Admin ===
In some translations of Luke 3:33, Admin is an ancestor of Jesus, the father of Aminadab and son of Arni.

=== Alexander ===
Alexander was a member of the Sanhedrin named in Acts 4:6 as part of a group before whom Peter and John were required to give an account of their healing power, following their arrest on the day of Pentecost.

=== Amos ===
The 10th generation grandfather of Jesus through Joseph, according to Luke 3:25. He was also the son of Nahum and the father of Mattathias.

=== Aristobulus ===
Aristobulus is apparently the patriarch of a household; Paul of Tarsus instructed his followers to greet "those who belong to the household of Aristobulus". Romans 16:10.

=== Azor ===
Azor is an ancestor of Jesus. He is the son of Eliakim, and the father of Zadok, and is mentioned in Matthew 1:13–14. According to Robert H. Gundry, Azor's name is a shorter name for Azariah.

== C ==
=== Cainan ===
Cainan was the son of Arphaxad and the father of Shelah according to the Gospel of Luke. He is not mentioned in the Old Testament but some other Masoretic Texts supports this idea.

=== Chloe ===
Chloe was a member and ostensible head of a Christian household in Corinth and associate of Paul the Apostle. (1 Corinthians 1:10–11).

=== Chuza ===
Chuza was the manager of Herod Antipas' household. His wife, Joanna, was a follower of Jesus (see Luke 8:1–3).

=== Claudia ===
Claudia was an associate of Paul the Apostle who greeted Saint Timothy in 2 Timothy 4:21.

=== Cosam ===
Cosam was the son of Elmadam according to the Gospel of Luke, he was also the father of Addi or Addia in Luke 3:28.

== E ==
=== Eleazar ===
Eleazar was the son of Eliud, the father of Matthan, and an ancestor of Saint Joseph. He is mentioned in (Matthew 1:15); and is a descendant of Zerubbabel.

=== Eli ===
See Heli

=== Eliakim ===
Eliakim is the name of 2 different paternal ancestors of Saint Joseph:

- The father of Jonam and the son of Melea.

- The father of Azor.

=== Eliezer ===
Eliezer was the son of Jorim and the father of Jose according to Luke 3:29. He is also an ancestor of Jesus Christ.

=== Eliud ===
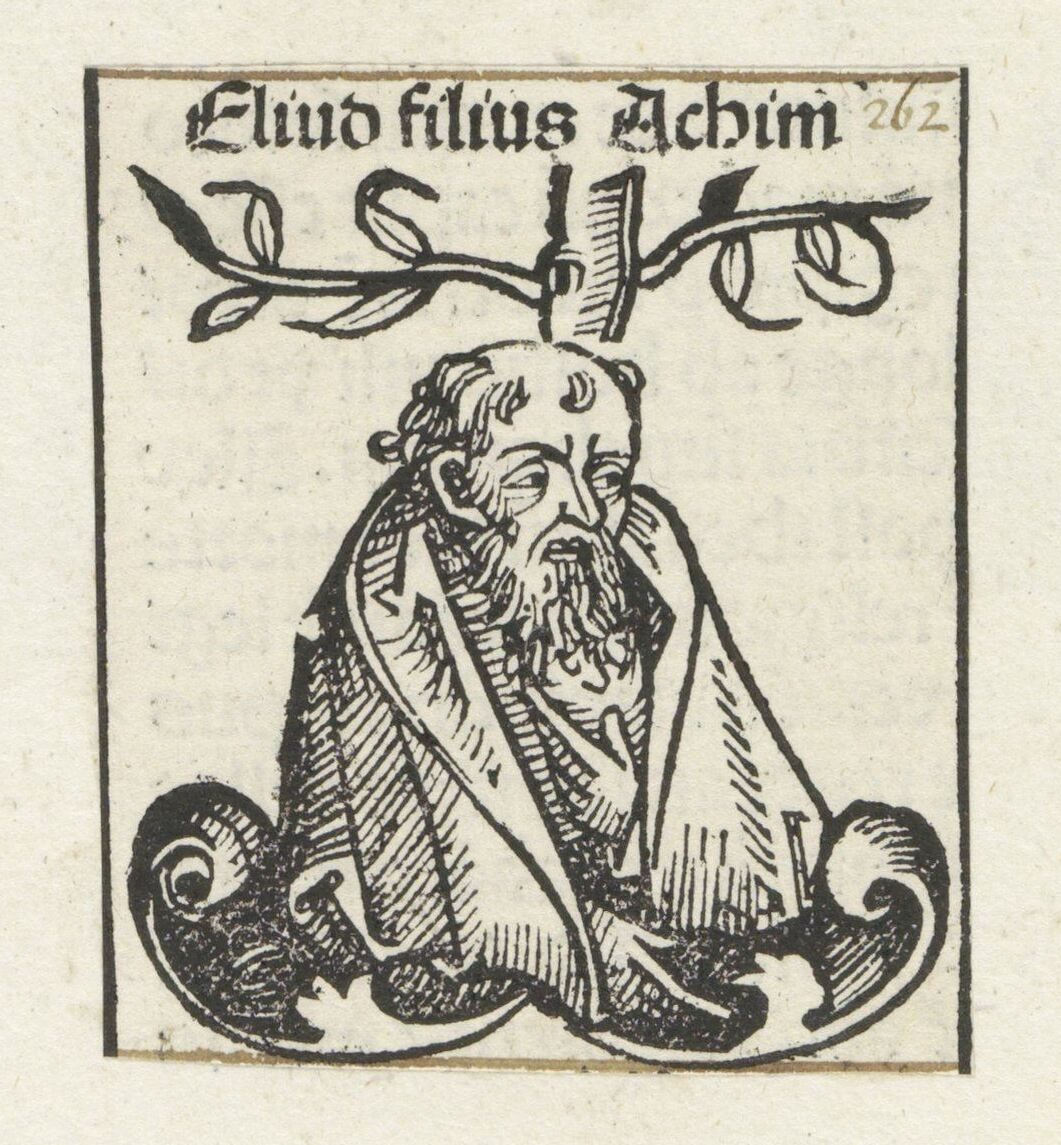
Eliud as depicted in the Nuremberg Chronicle (1493).

Eliud (meaning "God is my praise") was the great-great-grandfather of Saint Joseph. He is mentioned in Matthew 1:14–15.

=== Elmadam ===
Elmadam or Elmodam is the name of an ancestor of Saint Joseph, according to the genealogy found in the Gospel of Luke. He is the father of Cosam and the son of Er.

The Peshitta calls him Elmodad, but the Encyclopaedia Biblica suggests the reading "Elmatham," a form of the name Elnathan.

=== Er ===
Er was the son of Jose and the father of Elmodam according to Luke 3:28–29.

=== Esli ===
Esli was an ancestor of Jesus according to the Gospel of Luke being the son of Naggai and the father of Nahum.

=== Eubulus ===
Eubulus was an associate of Paul the Apostle who greeted Saint Timothy in 2 Timothy 4:21.

== H ==
=== Heli ===
Heli was the son of Matthat and the father of Saint Joseph only according to Luke; He was also the grandfather of Jesus Christ. In the Gospel of Matthew, Jacob was the father of Saint Joseph instead of Heli and could possibly be the case of Levirate Marriage according to Sextus Julius Africanus.

=== Hermogenes ===
A Hermogenes is briefly mentioned in 2 Timothy 1:15, where he, along with someone named Phygelus, are described as having "turned away" from Paul the Apostle. Nothing more is known about Hermogenes.

== J ==
=== Jacob ===
Jacob was the son of Matthan and the father of Saint Joseph in the Genealogy of Jesus found in the Gospel of Matthew. According to Sextus Julius Africanus, Heli and Jacob were step-brothers, and Heli died without having children, and his widow married his brother Jacob and bore him a child according to the law of Levirate Marriage his brother was legally the father of Saint Joseph as well. The name "Jacob" appears two times in the Genealogy of Jesus. Here is a chart representing that Heli and Jacob are both the father of Joseph:

Family tree

David
Solomon	Nathan
Many Generations	Many Generations
Eleazar	Levi
Matthan	Estha	Melchi	Panther
Jacob	(unnamed)	Heli	Anne	Joachim
Joseph	Mary
Jesus

=== Jannai ===
Jannai was an ancestor of Jesus Christ according to the Gospel of Luke. He was the son of Joseph (not to be confused with Saint Joseph) according to Luke 3:24 and the father of Melchi which was the father of Levi.

=== Jezebel ===
Jezebel was a false prophetess whom Jesus warned the church in Thyatira not to follow. She encouraged her followers to be promiscuous and to eat food sacrificed to idols. Jesus gave her a chance to repent of her sins, but she did not; thus, Jesus promised to punish her (see Revelation 2:20–23).

=== Joanan ===
Joanan was the son of Rhesa and the father of Joda or Judah, according to the Gospel of Luke.

=== Jonah ===
Jonah also called John was the father of Saint Peter according to Matthew 16:17 and John 1:42 who called him John instead of Jonah. It is unclear whether Jonah was also the father of Saint Andrew the brother of Simon bar-jona.

=== Jonam ===
Jonam was the son of Eliakim and the father of Joseph according to Luke 3:30.

=== Jorim ===
Jorim was the son of Matthat and the father of Eliezer, according to the Gospel of Luke.

=== Josech ===
Josech was the father of Semein or Semei and the son of Joda according to Luke 3:26. His name is sometimes translated as Joseph.

=== Joseph ===
There are 2 patriarchal ancestors of Jesus named Joseph, besides from his stepfather Saint Joseph.

- A son of Judah and the father of Simeon mentioned in Luke 3:30.
- A son of Mattathias and father of Jannai mentioned in Luke 3:24–25. He is also the great-great-great-great-grandfather of Saint Joseph.

=== Joshua ===
Joshua, Jose or Jesus was the son of Eliezer which was the son of Jorim. Joshua's name is sometimes translated as Jesus. He is also the father of Er and an ancestor of Jesus Christ.

=== Judah ===
Judah was the name of 2 biblical individuals in the New Testament. His name is also called Joda or Juda.

- The father of Simeon and the son of Joseph according to the passage Luke 3:30.
- The son of Joanan and the father of Josech. His name is also sometimes translated as Joda.

=== Judas of Straight Street in Damascus ===
When he went blind at his conversion experience, Paul the Apostle stayed at the home of a man named Judas who lived on Straight Street in Damascus. Then, Jesus told Ananias to go to Judas' house and restore Paul's sight (see Acts 9:1–19).

=== Julia ===
Julia was a Christian woman at Rome to whom Paul sent his salutations in Romans 16:15, supposed to be the wife (or sister) of Philologus.

== L ==
=== Levi ===
Levi (Hebrew לֵוִי) was the name of two minor figures mentioned in the Bible. For the more famous biblical character by this name, see Levi.

- The great-great-grandfather of Jesus; son of Melchi and father of Matthat. (Luke 3:24)
- Another ancestor of Jesus. (Luke 3:29)

== M ==
=== Maath ===
Maath is a figure who appears in the Genealogy of Jesus according to St. Luke. He was the son of Mattathias.

=== Mattatha ===
Mattatha is a figure who appears in the Genealogy of Jesus as the son of Nathan and the father of Menan, in the version found in the Gospel of Luke.

=== Mattathias ===
There are two minor biblical figures in the New Testament named Mattathias.

- Mattathias the son of Semein and the father of Maath in Luke 3:26.
- A son of Amos in the Genealogy of Jesus and the father of Joseph in Luke 3:25.

Luke makes no connection of either Mattathias to the Mattathias who led the Maccabean revolt, and neither name's ancestors nor descendants match those found for that Mattathias in 1 Maccabees (2:1).

=== Matthan ===
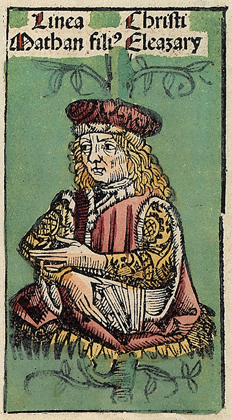
Matthan depicted in the Nuremberg Chronicle (1493).

Matthan (meaning "gift") was the grandfather of Saint Joseph. He is mentioned in Matthew 1:15.

=== Matthat ===
Possibly also translated as Matthan.

- The son of Levi, and father of Heli (Luke 3:24), great-grandfather to Jesus
- Son of another Levi (Luke 3:29), 31 generations before Jesus and 11 generations after King David

=== Melchi ===
(Meaning: "My king") there are two biblical figures named Melchi.

- A son of Addi, and father of Neri (Luke 3:28).
- Father of Levi and son of Jannai mentioned in the Gospel of Luke according to (Luke 3:24).

=== Melea ===
The son of Menan (or Menna) and father of Eliakim, he is briefly mentioned as an ancestor of Jesus (Luke 3:31).

=== Menna ===
Menna, also called Menan, was the son of Mattatha and the father of Melea according to Luke 3:31.

=== Mnason ===
A Christian of Jerusalem with whom Paul lodged (Acts 21:16). He was apparently a native of Cyprus, like Barnabas (Acts 11:19–20), and was well known to the Christians of Caesarea (Acts 4:36). He was an "old disciple" (R.V., "early disciple"), i.e., he had become a Christian in the beginning of the formation of the Church in Jerusalem.

== N ==
=== Naggai ===
Naggai (King James Version spelling Nagge) is the name of a figure found in the genealogy of Jesus according to the Gospel of Luke.

=== Nahum ===
Nahum, in addition to being the name of the well-known biblical prophet Nahum, is also the name of a figure mentioned in passing in Luke's version of the genealogy of Jesus. The Nahum of Luke has his name spelled Naum in the King James Version.

=== Narcissus ===
Narcissus is mentioned briefly in Romans 16:11, which sends greetings to "Those of the household of Narcissus who are in the Lord." Beyond this brief reference, nothing more is known for certain of the person referred to.

=== Naum ===
See Nahum.

=== Nereus ===
Nereus was a Christian mentioned with his unnamed sister in Romans 16:15 with other saints to whom Paul the Apostle sent greetings and salutations.

=== Neri ===
Neri according to the Gospel of Luke was the father of Shealtiel instead of Jeconiah the King of Judah. He was the son of Melchi Luke 3:27–28.. Could possibly be the case of Levirate Marriage.

== P ==
=== Phygelus ===
Phygelus or Phygellus is described in 2 Timothy 1:15 as an Asian citizen who along with Hermogenes turned away from the Apostle Paul from his ministry. Nothing else is known about Phygelus.

=== Publius ===
Publius is mentioned in Acts 28:7 as the Roman governor of Malta who welcomed Paul the Apostle and his cohorts and who had his dysentery-afflicted father healed by Paul.

== R ==
=== Rhesa ===
Rhesa was the son of Zerubbabel according to the Gospel of Luke chapter 3, instead of Abiud, Luke added Rhesa as the son of Zerubbabel, he was also the father of Joanan.

== S ==
=== Sadoc ===
See Zadok

=== Semein ===
Semein was the son of Josech also called Joseph. He was also the father of Mattathias according to Luke 3:26.

=== Simeon ===
Simeon (not to be confused with St. Simeon) was the father of Levi and the son of Judah according to Luke 3:29–30.

=== Simon Iscariot ===
Simon Iscariot was the father of Judas Iscariot (see John 6:71, John 13:2, and John 13:26).

== T ==
=== Tryphosa ===
Tryphosa was a Christian mentioned in Romans 16:12 with other saints to whom Paul the apostle sent greetings and salutations.

=== Tyrannus ===
Tyrannus was the operator of a school in Ephesus which the apostle Paul used as a base according to Acts 19:9

== Z ==
=== Zadok ===
Zadok or Sadoc was the son of Azor, and the father of Achim according to Matthew 1:14, Sadoc is his name in the King James Bible.

== See also ==
- List of biblical names
- List of burial places of biblical figures
- List of major biblical figures
- List of minor biblical tribes
