= Cainan =

Biblical figure omitted from the Masoretic genealogies

Cainan (from Hebrew: קֵינָן Qēnān) is mentioned in the Septuagint, the Greek translation of the Book of Genesis, the Book of Jubilees and the genealogy of Jesus given in Luke 3:36 in the New Testament. He is described as a son of Arpachshad and father of Salah, who lived in the time between Noah and Abraham.

The postdiluvian Cainan does not appear in the Masoretic Text, the most common Hebrew version of Genesis, where Arpachshad is noted as the father of Salah. He is also omitted from the Samaritan Pentateuch and the writings of the Jewish historian Josephus. Helen Jacobus has argued that the omission from the Masoretic text is deliberate.

Despite his name being omitted from the Masoretic text, a substantial number of traditions about this other Cainan exist in the history of literature.

According to the Book of Jubilees, Cainan was taught to read by his father, and he found, carved on the rocks by former generations, an inscription preserving the science of astrology as taught by the Watchers, who had rebelled from God before the deluge. He is also stated to have married a daughter of Madai named Melka.

In The Patriarchal Age: or, the History and Religion of Mankind (1854), George Smith writes:

It is remarkable that, notwithstanding the omission of the name of Cainan from the Hebrew text, and the consequent general rejection of him by historians, there are more traditions preserved of him than of his son Salah. "The Alexandrine Chronicle derives the Samaritans from Cainan; Eustachius Antiochenus, the Saggodians; George Syncellus, the Gaspheni; Epiphanius the Cajani. Besides the particulars already mentioned, it is said Cainan was the first after the flood who invented astronomy, and that his sons made a god of him, and worshiped his image after his death. The founding of the city of Harran in Mesopotamia is also attributed to him; which, it is pretended, is so called from a son he had of that name." – Anc. Univ. Hist., vol. i, p. 96, note.

The Alexandrian World Chronicle states:

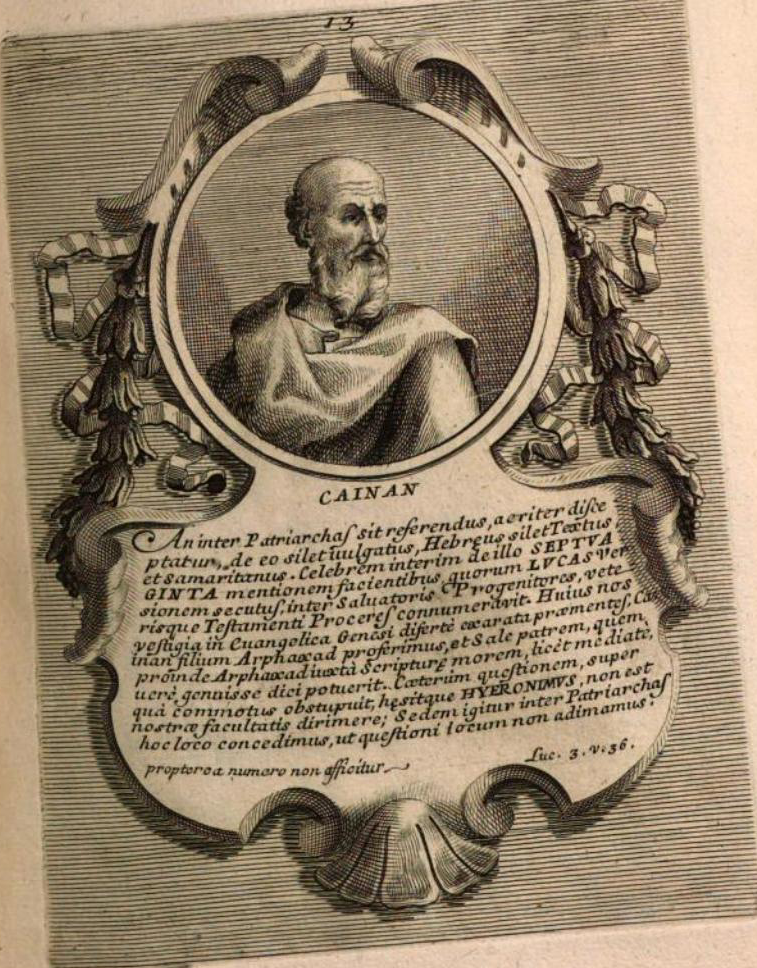
Cainan from Bartolomeo Gai's "Epitome Historico-Chronologica"

And Arphaxad begat Cainan, from whom the Samaritans from the east come from. And Cainan begat Salathee, whence the Salathees are made.

(Latin: Et arfaxad genuit cainan, unde fiunt qui ab oriente samaritae. Cainan autem genuit Salathee, unde fiunt Salathii.)
