= Shealtiel =

Biblical character

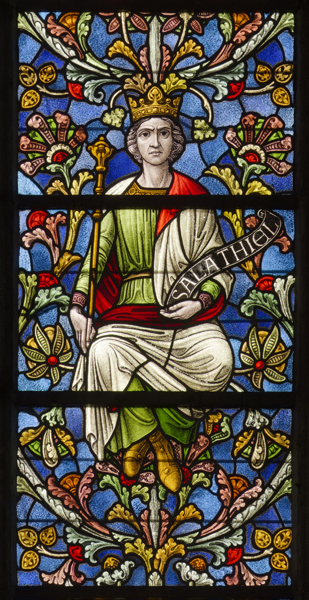
- Children: Zerubbabel
- Father: Jeconiah, Neri
- Relatives: Pedaiah

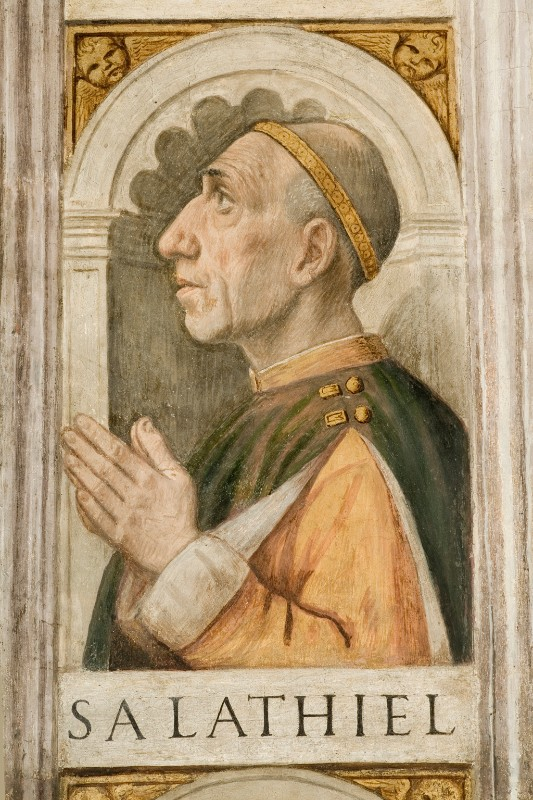
Shealtiel by Girolamo Tessari in Padova, Church of San Francesco

Shealtiel (Hebrew: שְׁאַלְתִּיאֵל, Šəʾaltīʾēl), transliterated in Greek as Salathiel (Koine Greek: Σαλαθιηλ, Salăthiēl), was the son of Jehoiachin, king of Judah (1 Chronicles, 1 Chronicles 3:17–18). The Gospel of Matthew 1:12 also list Shealtiel as the son of Jeconiah (line of Solomon). Jeconiah, Shealtiel, as well as most of the royal house and elite of the kingdom, were exiled to Babylon by order of Nebuchadnezzar II of Babylon after the first siege of Jerusalem in 597 BC. During the Babylonian captivity, Shealtiel was regarded as the second Exilarch (or king-in-exile), following his father.

== Name ==
In Hebrew, the name Shealtiel means, Shə’altî ’Ēl, "I asked El (for this child)". The name acknowledges that the son is an answer to the parents' prayer to God (El) to help them conceive and birth a child. Many Hebrew names similarly express the importance of, difficulty of, and thankfulness for a successful pregnancy.

Shealtiel is a significant, though controversial, member in the genealogies of the House of David and of the genealogy of Jesus. There is conflicting text in the Hebrew Bible in 1 Chronicles 3:19, which lists Zerubbabel as the son of Shealtiel's brother, Pedaiah (while the Greek Septuagint lists Zerubbabel as the son of Shealtiel). Though both genealogies of Jesus list a Zerubbabel who is the son of a Shealtiel, it is possible they may not be referring to the same pair of people. The two genealogies differ as to Shealtiel's paternity, with Matthew 1:12 agreeing with 1 Chronicles that Jeconiah was Shealtiel's father, and Luke 3:27 having Shealtiel as the son of an otherwise unknown man named Neri. Various explanations for this difference have been suggested, with one common explanation being that Luke traces Jesus's genealogy through Mary, in recognition of the virgin birth.

The apocalyptic work 2 Esdras, identifies the author as "Salathiel", the Greek translation of Shealtiel. 2 Esdras is considered apocryphal by Jews and almost all Christians, including Protestants, Roman Catholics and Eastern Orthodox. However, it is considered part of the Orthodox tewahedo deuterocanon. Chapter three states: "I, Salathiel, who am also called Ezra" (3:1). For this reason, the work is also sometimes known as Ezra Shealtiel. Ezra the scribe and Shealtiel lived many years apart, and Zerubbabel, Shealtiel's son, was the one who returned to Jerusalem. Also, there is no credible historical record that suggests that Ezra was ever called "Salathiel".

== Genealogy in the Hebrew Bible ==
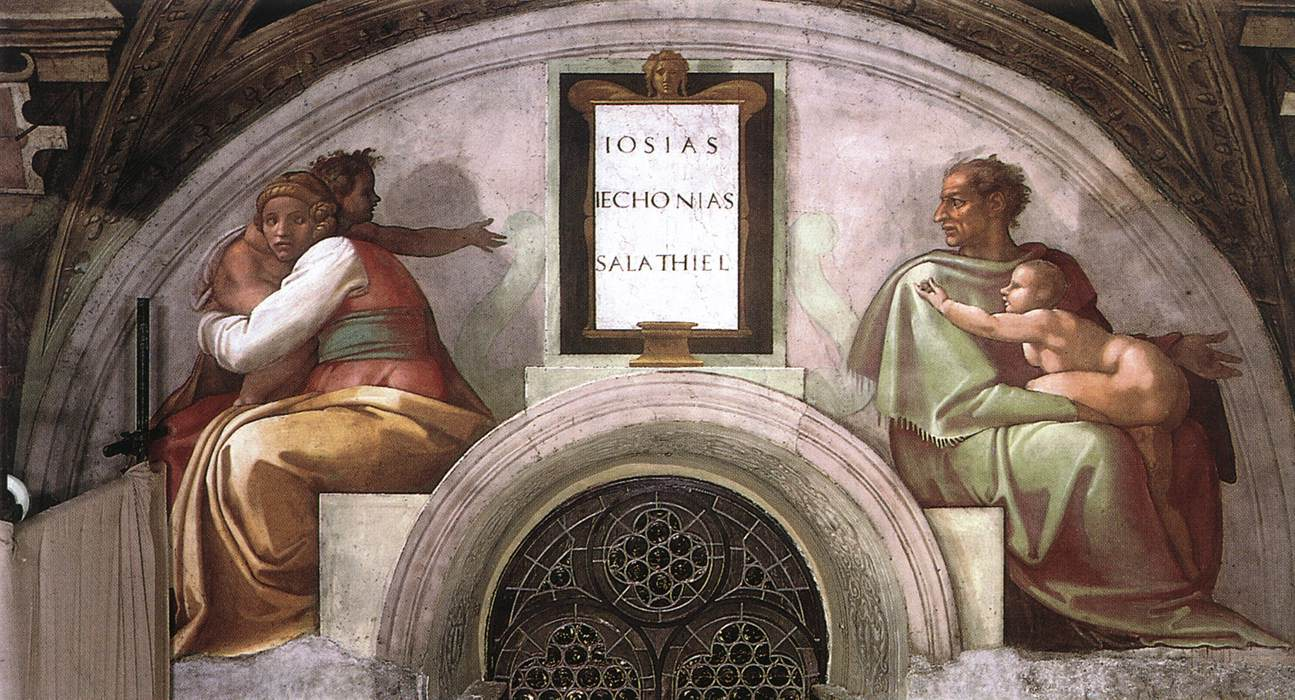
Lunette in the Sistine Chapel of Shealtiel with Josiah and Jeconiah.

The Hebrew Bible has conflicting texts regarding whether Zerubbabel is the son of Shealtiel or Pedaiah. Several texts (that are thought to be more-or-less contemporaneous) explicitly call Zerubbabel the "son of Shealtiel" (Ezra 3:2,8;5:2, Nehemiah 12:1, Haggai 1:1,12,14), and the genealogy given in the Septuagint text of 1 Chronicles supports that position, as does the Seder Olam Zutta. However, the Hebrew text of 1 Chronicles 3:17–19 makes Zerubbabel a nephew of Shealtiel: King Jehoiachin is the father of Shealtiel and Pedaiah, then Pedaiah is the father of Zerubbabel.

Various attempts have been made to show how both genealogies could be true. One explanation suggests Shealtiel died childless and therefore Pedaiah, his brother, married his widow according to a Jewish law regarding inheritance (Deuteronomy 25:5–6). If so, Zerubbabel would be the legal son of Shealtiel but the biological son of Pedaiah.

The other speculation suggests the title "son of Shealtiel" does not refer to being a biological son but to being a member in Shealtiel's household (Hebrew: בית, bet). The Hebrew term "father" (Hebrew: אב, av) can refer to a father of a household, similar to the Latin term paterfamilias. In this sense, a man who is the "father" of a household can therefore be referred to as the father of his own biological siblings, nephews and nieces, or anyone else who cohabitates in his household. Zerubbabel (and possibly his father Pedaiah) could be called a son if they lived in Shealtiel's household.

Perhaps both speculations could be true. Zerubbabel could be the legal son of Shealtiel and therefore also a member of his household. Notably, if Shealtiel had no biological children, Zerubbabel as a legal son would have inherited Shealtiel's household and become its new father with authority of over the other members of the household.

Another speculation simply suggests that the Masoretic Text of 1 Chronicles which identifies Zerubbabel as a son of Pedaiah could be a scribal error. It occurs in a part of the text where the Hebrew seems discongruent and possibly garbled (1 Chronicles 3:16–21). The expected mention of Shealtiel being a father seems accidentally omitted, and thus his children became confused with Pedaiah's. In contrast, the Greek Septuagint text of 1 Chronicles actually lists Shealtiel (and not Pedaiah) as Zerubbabel's father.

In any case, those texts that call Zerubbabel "son of Shealtiel" have a context that is overtly political and seems to emphasize Zerubbabel's potential royal claim to the throne of the Davidic Dynasty by being Shealtiel's successor. Zerubbabel is understood as the legal successor of Shealtiel, with Zerubbabel's title paralleling the High Priest Jeshua's title, "son of Jozadak", that emphasizes Joshua's rightful claim to the dynasty of highpriests, descending from Aaron. Therefore, with one descending from David and the other from Aaron, these two officials have the divine authority to rebuild the Temple.

The most common alternative spellings of Shealtiel are Salathiel (though this sometimes comes directly from the Bible), Saltel, Salatiel, Saltell, Saltial, Saltiel, Saltiél, Σαλτιέλ, Schaltiel, Scialtiel, Scieltiel, Sealthiel, Sealtiel, Sealtiël, Seltiel, Shaaltiel, Shalltell, Shaltiel, Shaltieli, Shealthiel, Shealtiel, Sjaltiel and Sjealtiel. Derivations include Chaaltiel, Chaltel, Challtelli, Chaltiel, Chartiel, Cheltiel, Saltelli, Saltellus, Salter (generally unconnected with the contemporary surname), Saltijeral, von Saltiel and Xaltiel.

== Genealogy in the Gospels ==
Both genealogies of Jesus mention a Shealtiel (and not Pedaiah) who is the father of a Zerubbabel. It is possible the two genealogies may not be referring to the same pair of people, as they differ regarding the name of Shealtiel's father. Matthew lists Shealtiel as the son of Jeconiah, which agrees with 1 Chronicles. In contrast, Luke lists a man named Shealtiel who is the son of an otherwise unknown man named Neri (Matthew 1:12 and Luke 3:27–28). Multiple explanations for this difference have been suggested, with one common explanation being that Luke traces the genealogy of Jesus through Mary, in recognition of the virgin birth.

Shealtiel House of David Cadet branch of the Tribe of Judah
| Preceded by Zedekiah | Leader of the House of David | Succeeded by Zerubbabel |
