= Heli (biblical figure) =

Grandfather of Jesus in the Gospel of Luke

Heli (/ˈhilaɪ/ HEE-lye; Koine Greek: Ἡλί Hēlī́ or Ἡλεί Hēleí; Latin: Heli; Eli in the New American Standard Bible) is an individual mentioned in the Gospel of Luke as the grandfather of Jesus. In Luke's genealogy of Jesus, Heli is listed as the father of Joseph, and the son of Matthat (Μαθθάτ or Ματθάτ).

Jesus was about thirty years old when he began his work. He was the son (as was thought) of Joseph son of Heli, son of Matthat, son of Levi (...)

Heli is not mentioned in the genealogy of Jesus in the Gospel of Matthew, the only other canonical gospel to include a genealogy; that genealogy instead identifies "Jacob" as Joseph's father.

Some early Church traditions and scholars—such as St. Jerome and Cornelius a Lapide—link the name Heli (Greek: Ἠλί, rendered Eli) with Joachim (Joiakim), suggesting that Joachim is a variant of Eliakim, and that Eli/Heli is an abbreviated form. In this view, the genealogical discrepancy between Luke (which names Heli) and Matthew (which names Jacob) may be explained if Heli is understood as Mary's father (Joseph's father-in-law), and these names refer to the same individual.

== Two genealogies of Jesus ==
The New Testament provides two accounts of the genealogy of Jesus, one in the Gospel of Matthew and another in the Gospel of Luke. Matthew starts with Abraham, while Luke begins with Adam. The lists are identical between Abraham and David, but differ radically from that point. Matthew has twenty-seven generations from David to Joseph, whereas Luke has forty-two, with almost no overlap between the names on the two lists. Notably, the two accounts also disagree on who Joseph's father was: Matthew says he was Jacob, while Luke says he was Heli.

Traditional Christian scholars (starting with Africanus and Eusebius) have put forward various theories that seek to explain why the lineages are so different, such as that Matthew's account follows the lineage of Joseph, while Luke's follows the lineage of Mary. Some modern critical scholars like Marcus Borg and John Dominic Crossan state that both genealogies are inventions, intended to bring the Messianic claims into conformity with Jewish criteria.

Another possibility is that since both Heli and Jacob have a similar name listed as their father (Matthan in Matthew, Matthat in Luke), a discrepancy that can easily be accounted for by error, that the names Heli and Jacob refer to the same person. Matthew relied heavily on fitting existing prophecy to the narrative; in the Old Testament, Jacob (the last of the biblical patriarchs) also had a son named Joseph. This explanation fits for Heli/Jacob himself, but not for the earlier genealogies.

== The curse on the Solomonic line ==
This is what the LORD says: 'Record this man as if childless, a man who will not prosper in his lifetime, for none of his offspring will prosper, none will sit on the throne of David or rule anymore in Judah.

— Jeremiah 22:30

If Matthew's genealogy is that of Mary, and Luke's of Joseph, then there is a problem with the curse on the Solomonic line, dating from the time of Jeconiah where Jeremiah pronounced that no descendant of Jeconiah would again sit on the throne of David in Judah. In contrast, if Luke's genealogy is that of Mary, and Matthew's of Joseph, then this creates no problem with the curse on the Solomonic line. However, Jeconiah's grandson Zerubbabel is later chosen by God, and was a governor of the Achaemenid Empire's Yehud Medinta (Province of Judah), as appointed by Darius the Great.

== Saint Joachim and Saint Anne ==
The apocryphal Protoevangelium of James gives the story of Saint Joachim and Saint Anne as the parents of Mary. This is largely followed in Catholic, Orthodox, and Anglican tradition.
