= Papponymic =

A papponymic is a personal name based on the name of one's grandfather, similar to a patronymic, a name derived from the name of one's father. Papponyms have been common in a number of societies such as Ancient Greece and Ancient Israel.

Papponymy has been frequently practiced in the Alaouite dynasty of Moroccan royalty for centuries, with sons sometimes being named after their great-grandfather, but never after their father. The last six generations of the Alaouite dynasty are:

1. Hassan I
2. Yusef
3. Mohammed V
4. Hassan II
5. Mohammed VI
6. Moulay Hassan
