= Selah (biblical figure) =

Ancestor of Abraham according to Genesis in Hebrew Bible

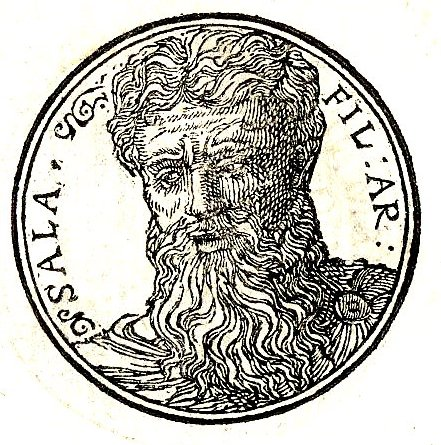
- Portrait from Promptuarii Iconum Insigniorum (1553)
- Born: 2419 BC
- Died: 1986 BC (aged 433)
- Children: Eber, and other sons and daughters
- Parent: Arpachshad (Cainan according to Septuagint)

Selah (Hebrew: שֶׁלַח, romanized: Šélaḥ), Salah or Sala (Greek: Σαλά – Salá) or Shelah was an ancestor of the Israelites and Ishmaelites according to the Table of Nations in Genesis 10. He is thus one of the table's "seventy names". He is also mentioned in Genesis 11:12–15, 1 Chronicles 1:18–24, and Luke 3:35–36.

In the ancestral line from Noah to Abraham, he is the son of Arpachshad (in the Masoretic Text and Samaritan Pentateuch) or Cainan (in the Septuagint) and the father of Eber. The name Eber for his son is the original eponym of the Hebrew people, from the root ‘abar (עבר, עָבַר), "to cross over".

The Gospel of Luke and Book of Jubilees both agree with the Septuagint in making Selah the son of Cainan, adding the information that his mother was Milcah (the daughter of Madai), while his wife is named as Mu'ak, daughter of Kesed (another son of Arphachsad).

The death age of Selah is given as 433 (Masoretic), 460 (Septuagint), and 460 (Samaritan).

Henry M. Morris states that Arpachshad, Selah, and Eber are listed as the most important sons since they were in the line of the promised Seed of the Woman.

His name is possibly the origin of the Jewish moneylender Shylock in Shakespeare's Merchant of Venice..

== In Islam ==
In Islam, Selah is sometimes identified as the islamic prophet Salih. Some scholars and researchers have suggested a possible connection between Salih, the Islamic prophet, and Selah, a figure or term mentioned in the Hebrew Bible. This hypothesis is based primarily on the similarity of their names and the tradition of prophets being shared across Abrahamic religions.

== See also ==
- Salih of Thamud
