= Hezron =

Figure in the Hebrew Bible

Hezron (Hebrew: חֶצְרוֹן, Modern: H̱eṣrōn, Tiberian: Ḥeṣrōn) is a name which occurs several times in the Hebrew Bible.

It may refer to:

- A plain in the south of Judah, south of Kadesh-barnea. (Book of Joshua, Joshua 15:3)
- A son of Reuben (son of Jacob). (Book of Genesis 46:9)
- A grandson of Judah and the grandfather of Amminadab and great-grandfather to Nahshon. Nahshon was Elisheba's brother and brother-in-law of Aaron. (Book of Exodus 6:23, Matthew 1:3)

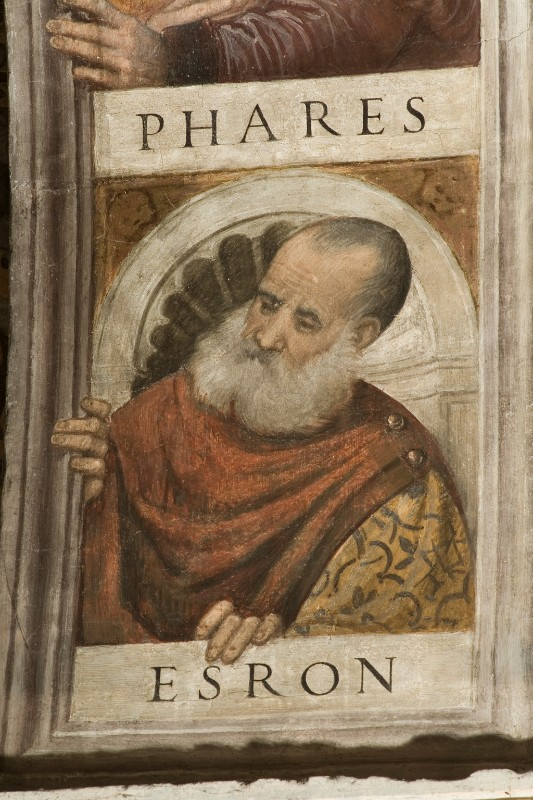
Portrait of Hezron by Girolamo Tessari (1523 - 1526)

He was also the man appointed by Moses, as ordered by God, to be Prince over the tribe of Judah. He was the son of Perez, the son of Judah, and one of the 70 souls to migrate to Egypt with Jacob (Genesis 46:12). His family are further detailed in 1 Chronicles 2, which records he had five sons by more than one woman. By a mother whose name is not mentioned, he had Jerahmeel, Ram, and Caleb (2:9). By Abijah, daughter of Makir, whom he married when aged 60 years, he had Segub (2:21) and Ashhur. Ashhur was born posthumously following Hezron's death. (2:24)

- A tribal leader when Moses led the Israelites out of Egypt. He died in the wilderness.
