= Amminadab =

Minor biblical figure

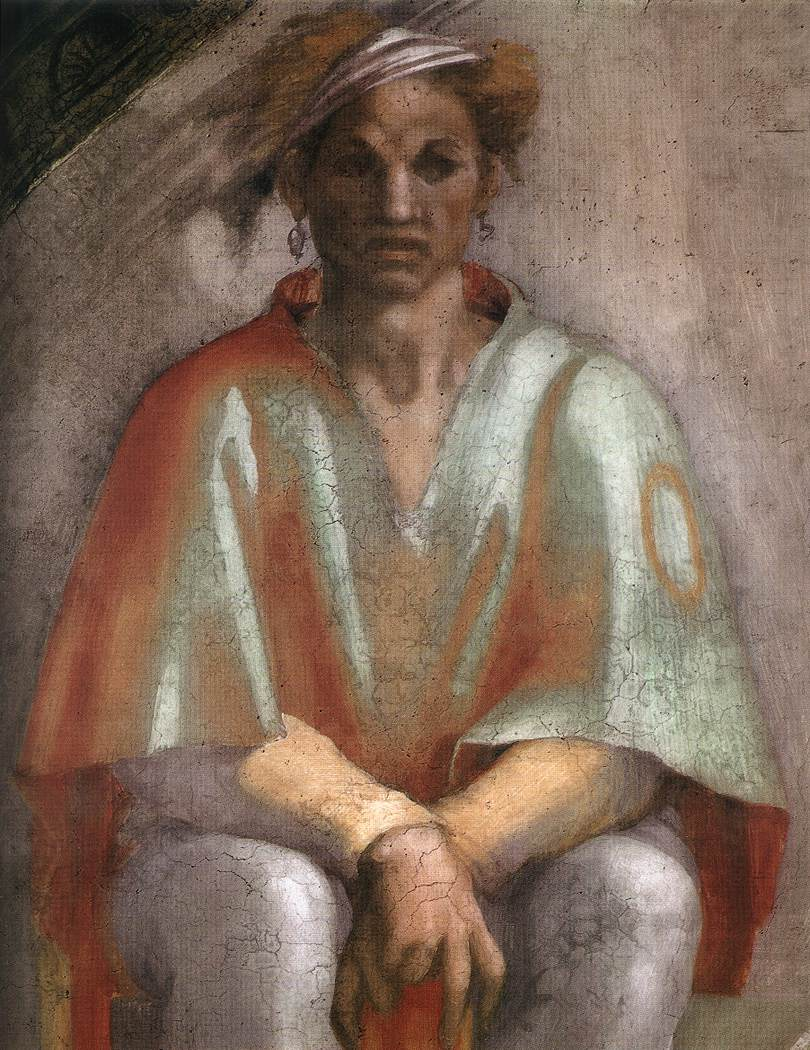
- Detail from a fresco in the Sistine Chapel by Michelangelo, 1511–1512
- Children: Elisheba; Nahshon
- Father: Ram
- Relatives: Aaron (son-in-law)

Amminadab (Hebrew: עַמִּינָדָב, romanized: ‘Ammīnāḏāḇ, lit. '"my people are noble"') is a minor character referred to in the Book of Exodus. He is the father-in-law of High Priest Aaron, brother of Moses.

Amminadab is also mentioned in the Book of Ruth (and also in the Gospel of Matthew and the Gospel of Luke) as the father of Nahshon, ancestor of King David and therefore the ancestor of Jesus.

This Amminadab was an Israelite mentioned in the lineage of Jacob's sons, Exodus 6:14-28. Mathew 1:1-16 shows a full record of ancestors and descendants.

The same name is mentioned in the Book of Samuel and 1 Chronicles. That man likely served in the tabernacle. He was one of 112 Levite descendants of Uzziel who received the great honor of bringing the Ark of the Covenant, back to Jerusalem from the Philistines.

== History ==
According to the Biblical genealogies, he was a son of Ram (also known as Aram). He was born during the Israelite exile in Ancient Egypt. Ram was the great-grandson of Judah. Amminadab was the father of Nahshon, chief of the tribe of Judah (Numbers 1:7; 2:3; 7:12, 17; 10:14). His daughter Elisheba was Aaron's wife (Exodus 6:23), making him Aaron's father-in-law.

Amminadab is one of the ancestors of Jesus painted in the lunettes of the Sistine Chapel. In the recent restoration process, the figure of Amminadab was shown to be wearing a contemporary Jewish badge, the wearing of which was being rigorously enforced at the time. Depictions normally occur in a pejorative context, and seem to link this figure from the Jewish past to the Renaissance present. In this case, it appears to place Amminadab as permanently exiled from salvation.

== In popular culture ==
Nathaniel Hawthorne took the name Aminadab (spelled with one "m") for the servant of the scientist Aylmer in his short story, "The Birthmark." In Hawthorne's story, Aminadab is depicted as physical, "uncouth" (literally, unknowing) and even animalistic in contrast to Aylmer. "He seemed to represent man's physical nature; while Aylmer's slender figure, and pale, intellectual face, were no less apt a type of the spiritual element." Paradoxically, perhaps, this animalistic minor character is also the voice of conscience, who, unlike his egotistical boss, is able to appreciate the birthmark that Aylmer wants to remove from his wife's face even at the cost of her life.

In the 1956 film The Ten Commandments, Amminadab is portrayed by H.B. Warner. During the Exodus, he is too old and frail to travel, so Bithiah takes his fig tree seedling and assures him that it will be planted in the Promised Land.
