= Ram (biblical figure) =

Minor figure in the Hebrew Bible

Ram (Hebrew: רם Rām) is a figure in the Hebrew Bible. He is the son of Hezron and ancestor of David. His genealogical lineage and descendants are recorded in 1 Chronicles 2:9-10 and at the Book of Ruth 4:19. In the New Testament, his name is given as "Aram" (Greek: Ἀράμ) and "Arni" (Greek: Ἀρνὶ).

== Biblical Account ==
The only mentions of Ram in the Bible is within genealogies, and thus we know virtually nothing else about him other than in relation to others.

For instance, in Ruth 4:19, the family line of Perez is recounted. In Ruth 4:19, the Bible says, "Hezron the father of Ram, Ram the father of Amminadab"

Ram's father, Hezron, was one of the original descendants of Jacob who ended up in Egypt. Thus, Ram would have been born and grew up in Egypt, before the time of the Exodus.

Later, in the New Testament, Ram is also mentioned in both the genealogies that Matthew and Luke share to tell of the family tree of Jesus. He is mentioned in Matthew 1:3-4 and Luke 3:33.

Ram's older brother, Jerahmeel, named his firstborn son Ram.
