= Matthew 1:3 =

- ← 1:2 1:4 →
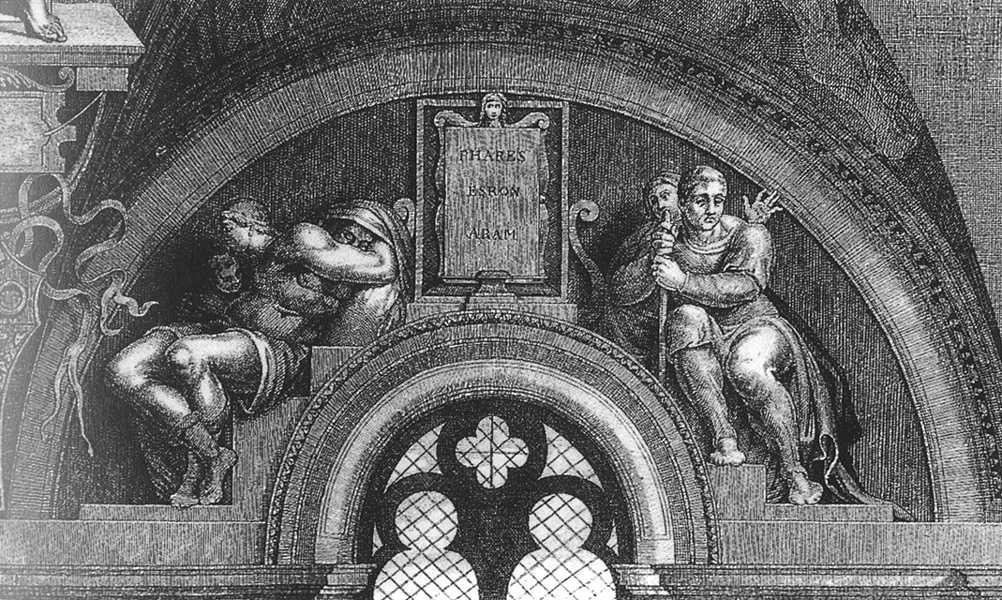
- A sketch of Michelangelo's destroyed Phares - Esrom - Aram.
- Book: Gospel of Matthew
- Christian Bible part: New Testament

Matthew 1:3 is the third verse of the first chapter in the Gospel of Matthew in the New Testament. The verse is part of the section where the genealogy of Joseph, the legal father of Jesus, is listed.

== Description ==
The original Koine Greek, according to Westcott and Hort, reads:

Ἰούδας δὲ ἐγέννησεν τὸν Φαρὲς
καὶ τὸν Ζαρὰ ἐκ τῆς Θάμαρ,
Φαρὲς δὲ ἐγέννησεν τὸν Ἐσρώμ,
Ἐσρὼμ δὲ ἐγέννησεν τὸν Ἀράμ,

In the King James Version of the Bible the text reads:

And Judas begat Phares
and Zara of Thamar;
and Phares begat Esrom;
and Esrom begat Aram;

The World English Bible translates the passage as:

Judah became the father of Perez
and Zerah by Tamar.
Perez became the father of Hezron.
Hezron became the father of Ram.

For a collection of other versions see BibleHub Matthew 1:3.

== Analysis ==
This is the second verse of the genealogy and these are the ancestors of many Old Testament figures. This genealogy matches that given in several other places in the Bible. Harold Fowler notes that the portion from this verse to Matthew 1:6 seems to be based on Ruth 4:18–22. It covers a period before and during the Egyptian captivity. The genealogy runs through Judah, Perez, Hezron, and Aram. Nothing is known of Hezron or Aram, other than their appearances in the various genealogies. Perez, his brother and mother, are important figures in the Old Testament.

The most notable part of the genealogy, and where it diverts from others recounting this lineage, is the mention of Zerah, brother of Perez, and their mother Tamar. These two figures are not directly on the genealogy, but are mentioned nonetheless. Tamar, the wife of Judah, is the first of four women that are added to Matthew's genealogy. 1:5 mentions Ruth and Rahab while in 1:6 Bathsheba, wife of Uriah the Hittite, is mentioned indirectly. This is unusual because in this period women were not generally included in genealogies. The women do not appear in the genealogy in Luke 3. Fowler states that the addition of the female names to the genealogy was not only unprecedented, but that the very idea would have been "abhorrent" to the traditional authorities.

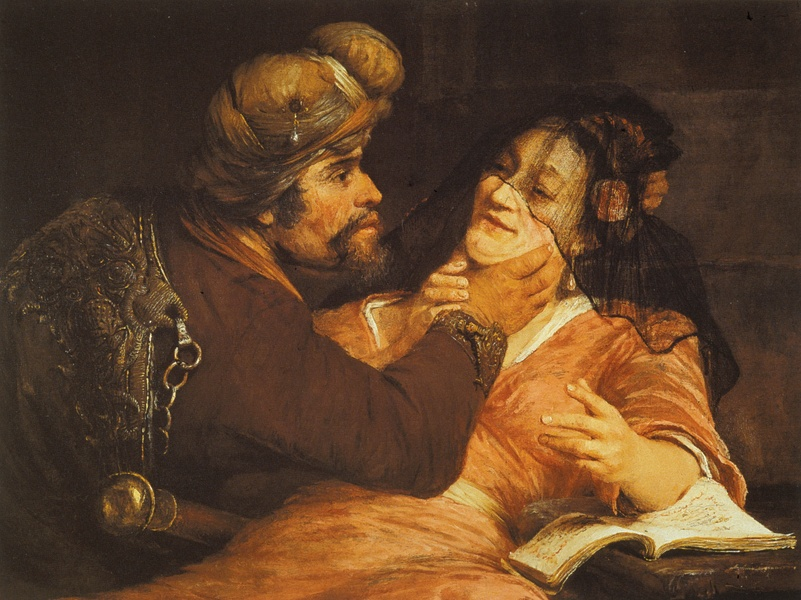
Tamar and Judah (painting by Arent de Gelder, 1667).

There is a fifth prominent woman in Matthew 1, the Virgin Mary. William F. Albright and C.S. Mann support the popular theory that the four other women are mentioned to highlight the important roles women have played in the past and also to portray Mary, the Mother of Jesus, as the equal of these well-known figures. Raymond E. Brown feels these women are added to show that God often works through women and also that his actions are not always in keeping with standard mores. Feminist scholars such as Amy-Jill Levine support the idea that the addition of women to the male dominated genealogy demonstrates that women have an important role and serves to undermine the patriarchal message of the long list of male begat male.

Jerome is the first to have noted the sinful nature of the women. Bathsheba was an adulteress and Rahab was a harlot. There were many greater, more notable, and more virtuous women in Jewish history that are not mentioned. Jerome felt Matthew includes these women to illustrate how pressing the need for Jesus is at the time. Robert H. Gundry agrees that all four have a dubious reputation and sees their addition to the genealogy as an attempt to show that the great leaders of Jewish history have origins as undignified as those of Jesus. Fowler disagrees, arguing that under any circumstances the author of Matthew would have been unlikely to link the Virgin Mary to harlots and adulterers.

Another important link between the four, first noted by John Chrysostom, is their foreignness. All four women were traditionally regarded as non-Jewish. Rahab was a Canaanite as most likely was Tamar. Ruth was a Moabite and Bathsheba is perhaps a Hittite and was certainly married to one. Bathsheba's foreignness is emphasized in Matthew 1:6 as she is referred to not by her name, but as "the wife of Uriah", Uriah being Uriah the Hittite, a well-known foreigner. The inclusion of the four foreign women is often interpreted as showing that Jesus' is not only meant as the saviour of the Jews, but of the Gentiles as well.

== Sources ==
- Fowler, Harold (1968). The Gospel of Matthew: Volume One. Joplin: College Press.

Preceded by Matthew 1:2	Gospel of Matthew; Chapter 1	Succeeded by Matthew 1:4
