= Matthew 1 =

- ← Malachi 4 chapter 2 →
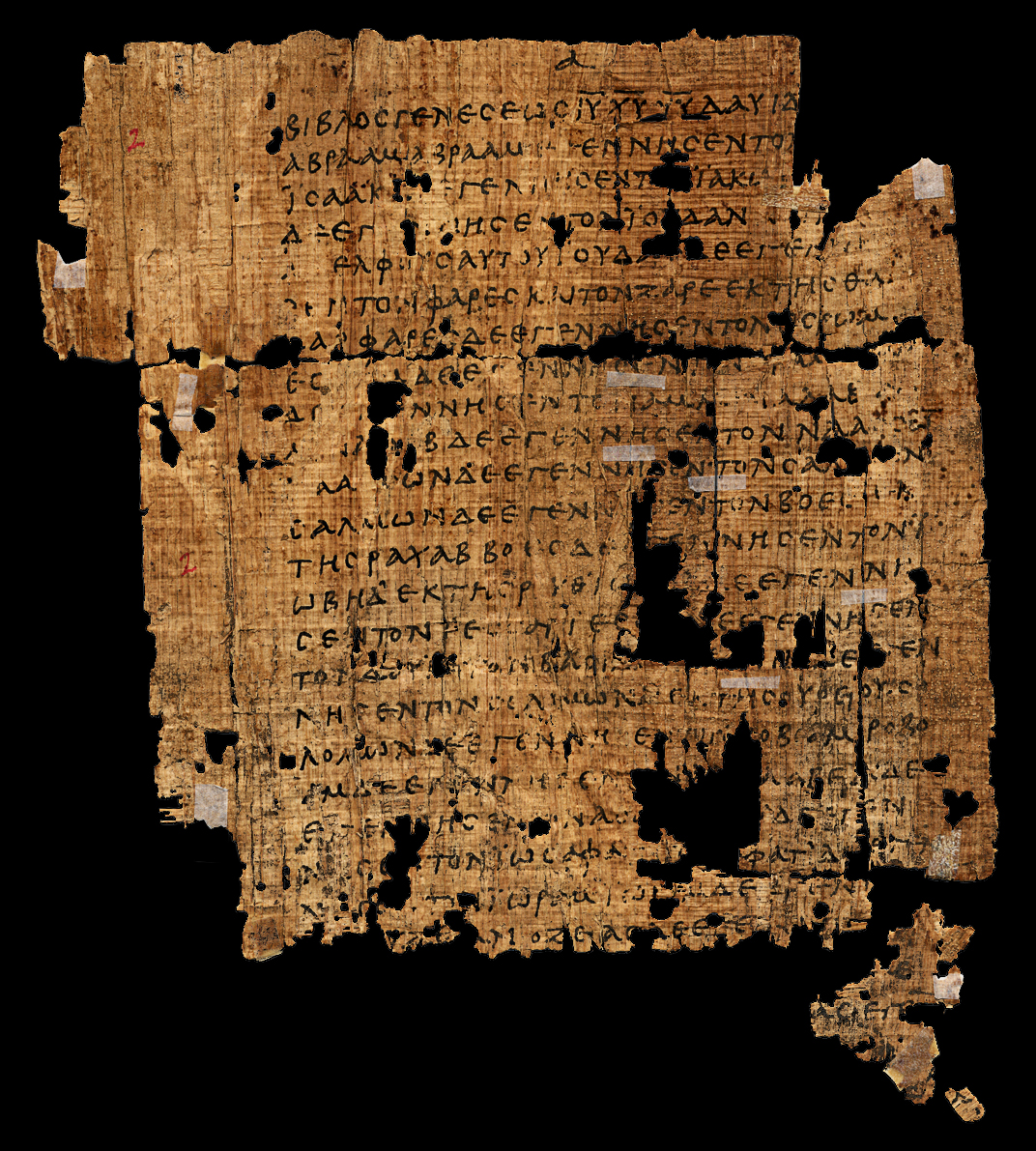
- Gospel of Matthew 1:1–9,12 on the recto side of Papyrus 1, written about AD 250
- Book: Gospel of Matthew
- Category: Gospel
- Christian Bible part: New Testament
- Order in the Christian part: 1

Matthew 1 is the first chapter of the Gospel of Matthew in the New Testament. It contains two distinct sections. The first lists the genealogy of Jesus from Abraham to his legal father Joseph, husband of Mary, his mother. The second part, beginning at verse 18, provides an account of the virgin birth of Jesus Christ.

== Text ==
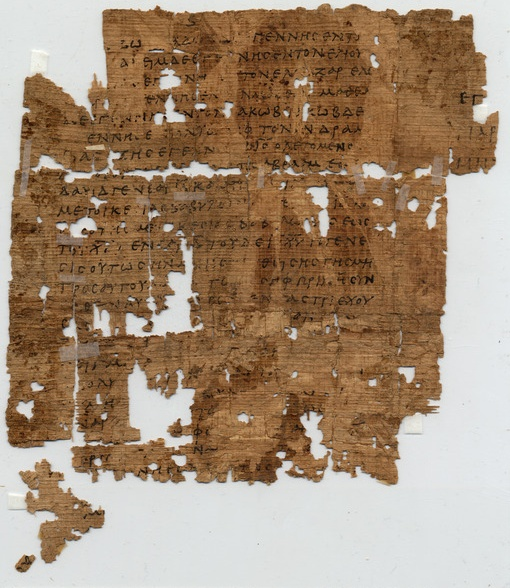
Matthew 13,14–20 on verso side of Papyrus 1 (~250 AD)

The original text was written in Koine Greek. This chapter is divided into 25 verses.

=== Textual witnesses ===
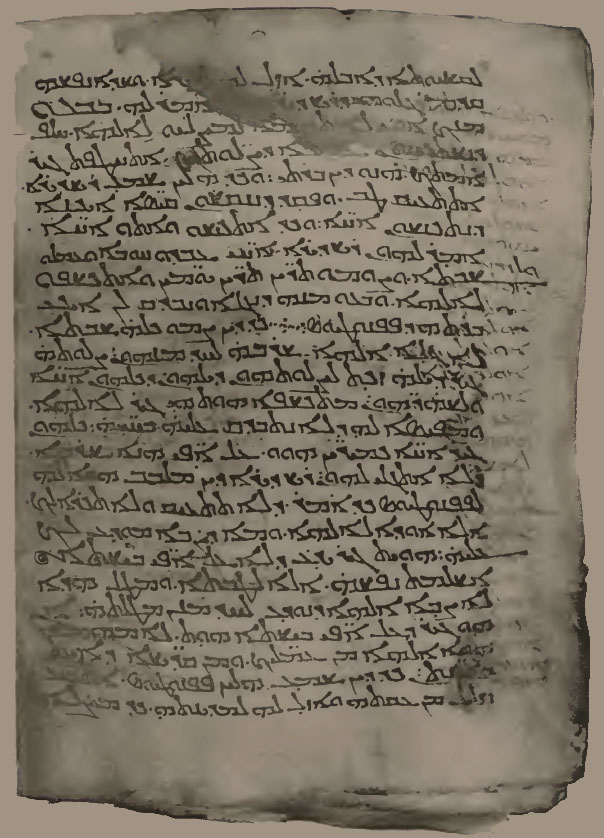
Matthew 1:1–17 in Syriac Sinaiticus, folio 82b; superimposed: life of Saint Euphrosyne

Some early manuscripts containing the text of this chapter are: (Note: The extant Codex Alexandrinus does not contain this chapter due to a lacuna.)

- In Koine Greek:
  - Codex Vaticanus (~325–350; complete)
  - Codex Sinaiticus (~330–360; complete)
  - Codex Washingtonianus (~400)
  - Codex Bezae (~400; extant verses 21–34)
  - Codex Ephraemi Rescriptus (~450; extant verses 3–34)
- In Syriac:
  - Curetonian Gospels (2nd/5th century)
  - Syriac Sinaiticus (4th/5th century)
  - Peshitta (5th century)

== The genealogy ==
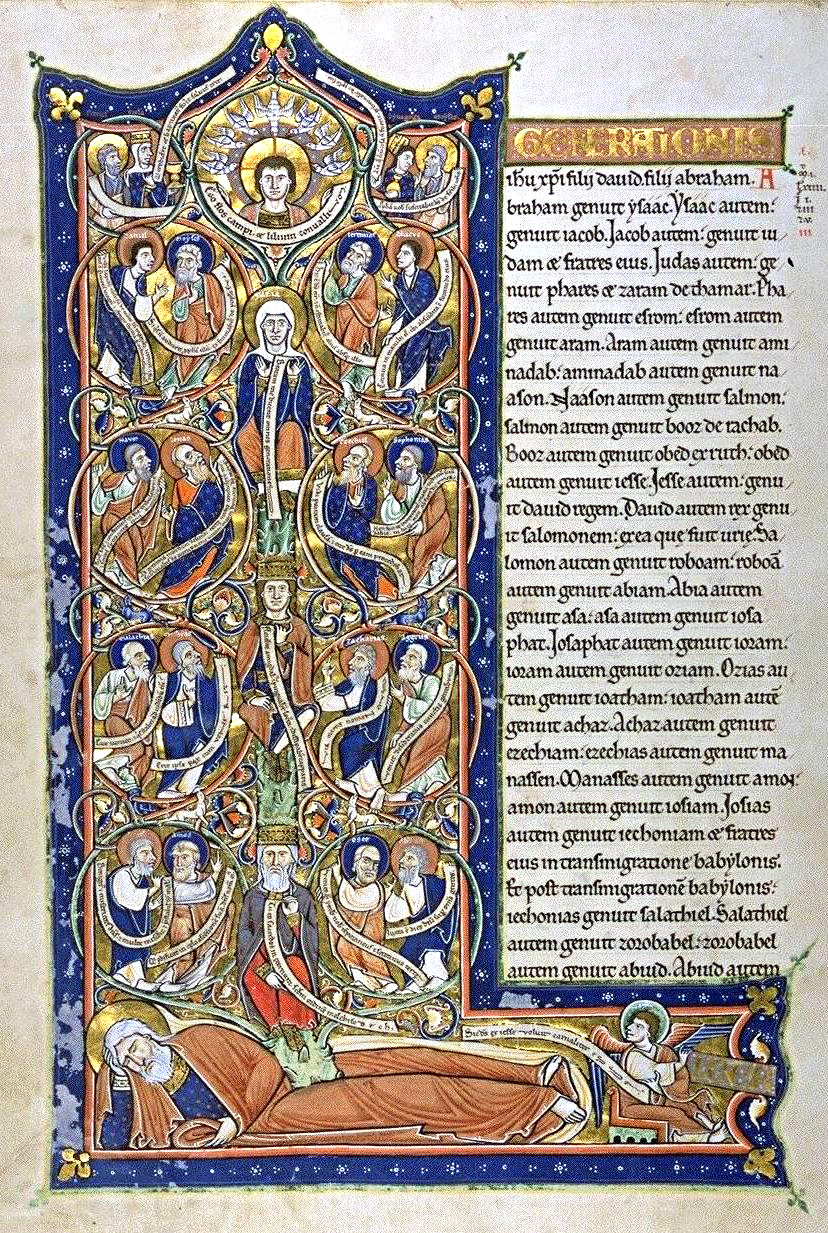
The genealogy in Matthew was traditionally illustrated by a Jesse Tree showing the descent of Jesus from Jesse, father of King David.

=== Matthew 1:1–17 ===
Matthew opens with the genealogy of Jesus, set out in three stages each of 14 generations: from Abraham to David, from David to the Babylonian exile and thence to Jesus' legal father Joseph, the husband of Mary his mother. The list opens and closes with a significant title for Jesus as "Jesus Christ" (1:1, 1:18; rarely used in the Gospel of Matthew). The opening words of the gospel show that it is written by a Jew for Jewish readers. The genealogy demonstrates that Jesus comes from the seed of Abraham and belongs to the House of David, and thus is their heir. The Gospel also asserts Jesus is, in fact, the Son of God, and Joseph is, thus, not actually Jesus' father. Legally, however, Joseph is Jesus' father and some scholars contend legal parentage is of the most importance. Ra McLaughlin argues that the central event in this passage is actually the adoption of Jesus by Joseph (signified by his naming of the child), which alone makes Jesus eligible to be the messiah from the line of David.

The section begins with Abraham, who is traditionally regarded as the ancestor of all the families of the Earth. It then runs through the prominent Old Testament figures of Isaac, Jacob, and Judah. The passage also references Judah's brothers who have no actual place in the genealogy. Gundry contends they are included because the author of Matthew is trying to portray the people of God as a brotherhood.

There are several problems with the genealogies. The list here is significantly different from that found in Luke 3, where the list from the Babylonian captivity to Jesus' grandfather is wholly different. Matthew skips several names in portions where the genealogy is well known from other sources, Jehoiakim is left out in 1:11 and four names are dropped from 1:8. Unlike most Biblical genealogies, Matthew's genealogy mentions several figures not in the direct line of descent, including four women, Tamar, Rahab, Ruth and Bathsheba.

Several theories address these questions. One popular theory is that, while Matthew provides the genealogy of Joseph and his father Jacob, Luke details the genealogy of Joseph's father-in-law Heli. Thus, the author of Matthew focuses on Jesus' royalty lineage, rather than precise biological line (that possibly used by the author Luke) which the author of Matthew did not have access to. McLaughlin argues that because Jeconiah must be counted in two different groups in order to make the "fourteen generations" of 1:17, the genealogy here must be seen, not as a historically complete list, but as a literary device intended to highlight four significant events in Israelite history: the covenant with Abraham, the covenant with David, the Babylonian exile, and especially the reign of the messiah, which is the subject of the rest of the Gospel.

Other scholars doubt these theories, and most who do not believe in the inerrancy of the Bible believe one or both of the pair are historically inaccurate. Luke's genealogy contains a more realistic number of names, given the time period, and Matthew's list also lacks the papponymic naming used in the period. Gundry believes the latter part of Matthew's list is "a large figure of speech". He argues that at the time it was perfectly acceptable to fill gaps in a historical narrative with plausible fiction.

== Birth of Jesus ==
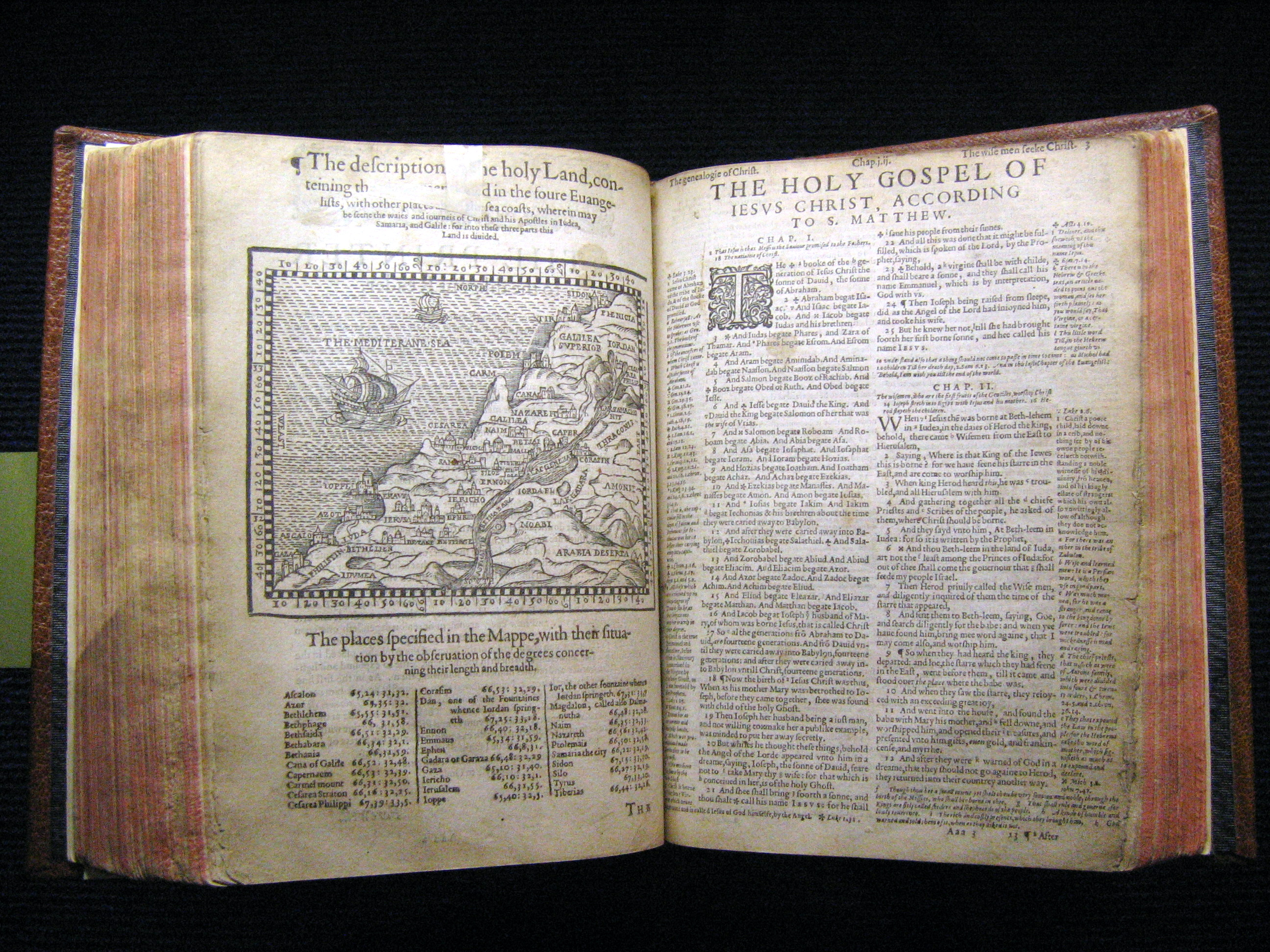
Gospel of Matthew chapter 1 and a part of chapter 2 in the Geneva Bible (16th century)

=== Matthew 1:18–25 ===
The second part of Matthew 1 relates some of the events leading up to the birth of Jesus (Matthew 2:1). While Luke and Matthew focus on varying details, the most important ideas, such as the Virgin Birth and the divine nature of Jesus, are shared. Unlike Luke's account, Matthew focuses on the character of Joseph and Joseph's discovery and concern over his betrothed's pregnancy "before they came together", and the message from an angel telling Joseph to stand by Mary, quoting Isaiah 7:14 presaging the birth of the Messiah.

This section's focus on Joseph is unusual. Swiss theologian Eduard Schweizer suggests that Matthew is far more concerned with proving Jesus' legal status as the stepson of Joseph, and thus a legal heir of David, than with proving the Virgin Birth. Schweizer feels this evinces Matthew's intended audience was of predominantly Jewish background, a pattern continuing throughout the Gospel, and the importance Old Testament references provides further evidence. Commentary writer David Hill believes that the quote from Isaiah was, in fact, the central element and believes the entire last part of the chapter was written to prove that Jesus' story matches the prophecy.

Stendhal, by contrast, sees the second section of this chapter as a large footnote to the last line of the genealogy, a lengthy explanation of why Joseph is merely the husband of Jesus' mother but also why Jesus is an heir to David. McLaughlin argues that Matthew recognizes that the prophecy Isaiah gave to King Ahaz in the referenced Old Testament passage concerned a virgin living at that time (namely, Isaiah's wife) and a child (namely, Maher-Shalal-Hash-Baz), who was born as a sign to Ahaz (Isaiah 8:1), and he argues that Matthew saw the act of salvation of which Maher-Shalal-Hash-Baz's birth was a sign as a "type" (or pre-figuring) of the salvation that would come through the virgin and child he was describing (namely, Mary and Jesus).

Other commentators feel this section should be attached to the second chapter, which is divided into four sections, each focusing on an Old Testament passage, and this portion is often seen as the first of those sections.

== Verses ==
- Matthew 1:1
- Matthew 1:2
- Matthew 1:3
- Matthew 1:4
- Matthew 1:5
- Matthew 1:6
- Matthew 1:7
- Matthew 1:8
- Matthew 1:9
- Matthew 1:10
- Matthew 1:11
- Matthew 1:12
- Matthew 1:13
- Matthew 1:14
- Matthew 1:15
- Matthew 1:16
- Matthew 1:17
- Matthew 1:18
- Matthew 1:19
- Matthew 1:20
- Matthew 1:21
- Matthew 1:22
- Matthew 1:23
- Matthew 1:24
- Matthew 1:25

== Sources ==
- Albright, W.F. and C.S. Mann. "Matthew". The Anchor Bible Series. New York: Doubleday & Company, 1971.
- Brown, Raymond E. The Birth of the Messiah: A Commentary on the Infancy Narratives in Matthew and Luke. London: G. Chapman, 1977.
- Hill, David. The Gospel of Matthew. Grand Rapids: Eerdmans, 1981
- Jones, Alexander. The Gospel According to St. Matthew. London: Geoffrey Chapman, 1965.
- Keener, Craig S. (1999). A commentary on the Gospel of Matthew. Wm. B. Eerdmans Publishing. ISBN 978-0-8028-3821-6.
- McLaughlin, Ra. "The Adoption of Jesus: On Matthew 1:1-25". Reformed Perspectives Magazine, vol. 7, no. 35. 2005.
- Schweizer, Eduard. The Good News According to Matthew. Atlanta: John Knox Press, 1975
