= Matthew 1:6 =

- ← 1:5 1:7 →
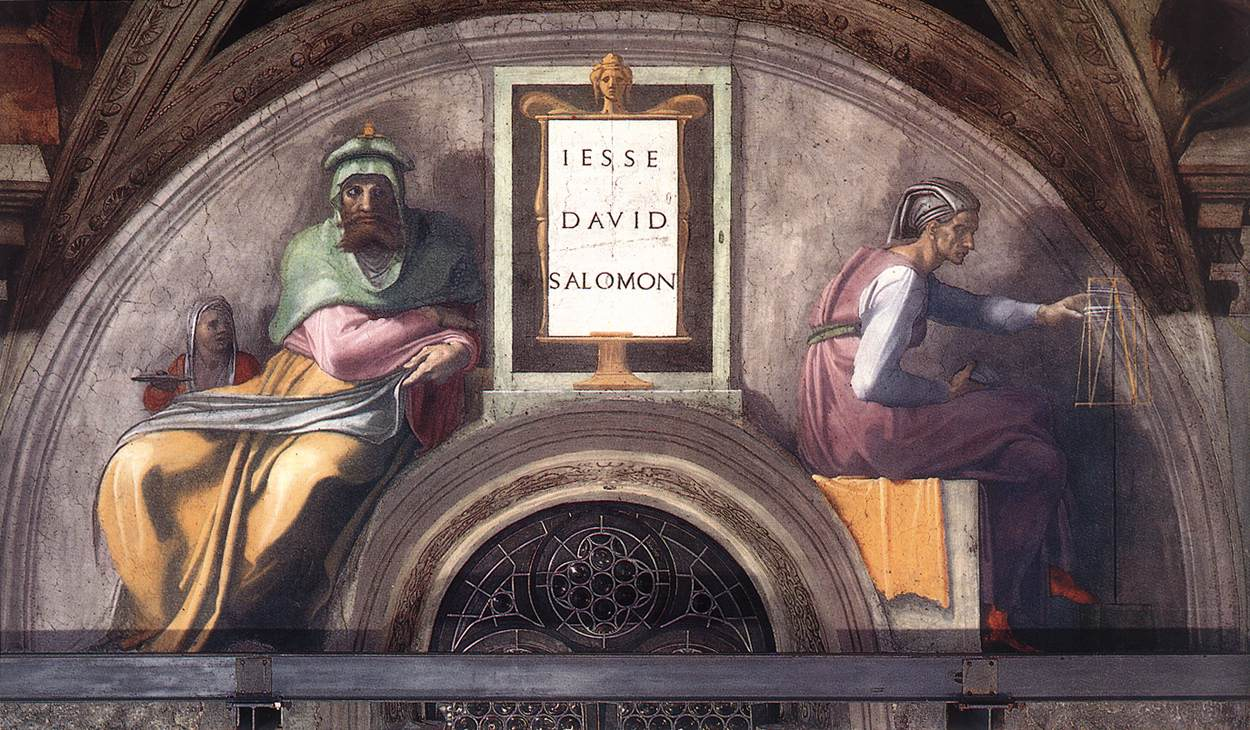
- Michelangelo's Jesse-David-Solomon. David is generally seen as the man on the left with Solomon the child behind him.
- Book: Gospel of Matthew
- Christian Bible part: New Testament

Matthew 1:6 is the sixth verse of the first chapter of the Gospel of Matthew in the New Testament. The verse is part of the section where the genealogy of Joseph, the legal father of Jesus, is listed.

== Content ==
The text of the King James Version reads:

And Jesse begat David the king;
and David the king begat Solomon
of her that had been the wife of Urias;

The World English Bible translates the passage as:

Jesse became the father of King David.
David became the father of Solomon
by her who had been the wife of Uriah.

For a collection of other versions see BibleHub Matthew 1:6.

== Analysis ==
This verse marks the end of the first third of the genealogy as the list and the transition from the list of descendants of Abraham to the list of the Kings of Judah. This change is marked by the reference to "David the king." Robert H. Gundry also sees the reference to "David the king", an Old Testament turn of phrase, as an attempt to present him as a prototype for "Jesus the king."

Allison suggests that the key to understanding the composition of the genealogy is the device known as 'gematria', where 'names are given numerical value' (cf. Revelation 13:18). The name of "David" in Hebrew consists of only three consonants, which the numerical value amounts to fourteen: d + w + d = 4 + 6 + 4, so that as David's name is the fourteenth on the list, that he is given the title 'king', and that 'David' occurs both before and after the genealogy, it can be inferred that 'David' is the structural key to Matthew 1:2–17.

The genealogy of Luke 3 and Matthew diverge at this point. Previously the lists from Abraham to David were identical. While Matthew continues to Solomon, Luke links to David's less well known son Nathan. One explanation for this divergence is that Luke's genealogy is of Mary's father Heli rather than of Joseph. Gundry argues that the divergence is because while Luke was following Joseph's biological ancestry, Matthew is listing Jesus' predecessors as the leader of the Jewish people.

The wife of Uriah the Hittite mentioned as the mother of Solomon is Bathsheba. Mentioning her by only her first husband's name emphasizes both her foreignness and the adulterous nature of her union with David. She is one of four women that are included in the genealogy (the other three are: Tamar, Rahab and Ruth; not counting Mary, mother of Jesus). Fowler states that the addition of the female names to the genealogy was not only unprecedented, but that the very idea would have been "abhorrent" to the traditional authorities. William F. Albright and C.S. Mann support the popular theory that the four women are mentioned to highlight the important roles women have played in the past and also to portray Mary, the Mother of Jesus, as the equal of these well-known figures. Raymond E. Brown feels these women are added to show that God often works through women and also that his actions are not always in keeping with standard mores. Feminist scholars such as Amy-Jill Levine support the idea that the addition of women to the male dominated genealogy demonstrates that women have an important role and serves to undermine the patriarchal message of the long list of male begat male. Robert H. Gundry suggests that all four have a dubious reputation and sees their addition to the genealogy as an attempt to show that the great leaders of Jewish history have origins as undignified as those of Jesus, although Harolf Fowler disagrees, arguing that under any circumstances the author of Matthew would have been unlikely to link the Virgin Mary to harlots and adulterers.

== Sources ==
- Allison, Dale C. Jr. (2007). "57. Matthew". In Barton, John; Muddiman, John (eds.). The Oxford Bible Commentary (first (paperback) ed.). Oxford University Press. pp. 844–886. ISBN 978-0199277186.

Preceded by Matthew 1:5	Gospel of Matthew; Chapter 1	Succeeded by Matthew 1:7
