= Matthew 1:8 =

- ← 1:7 1:9 →
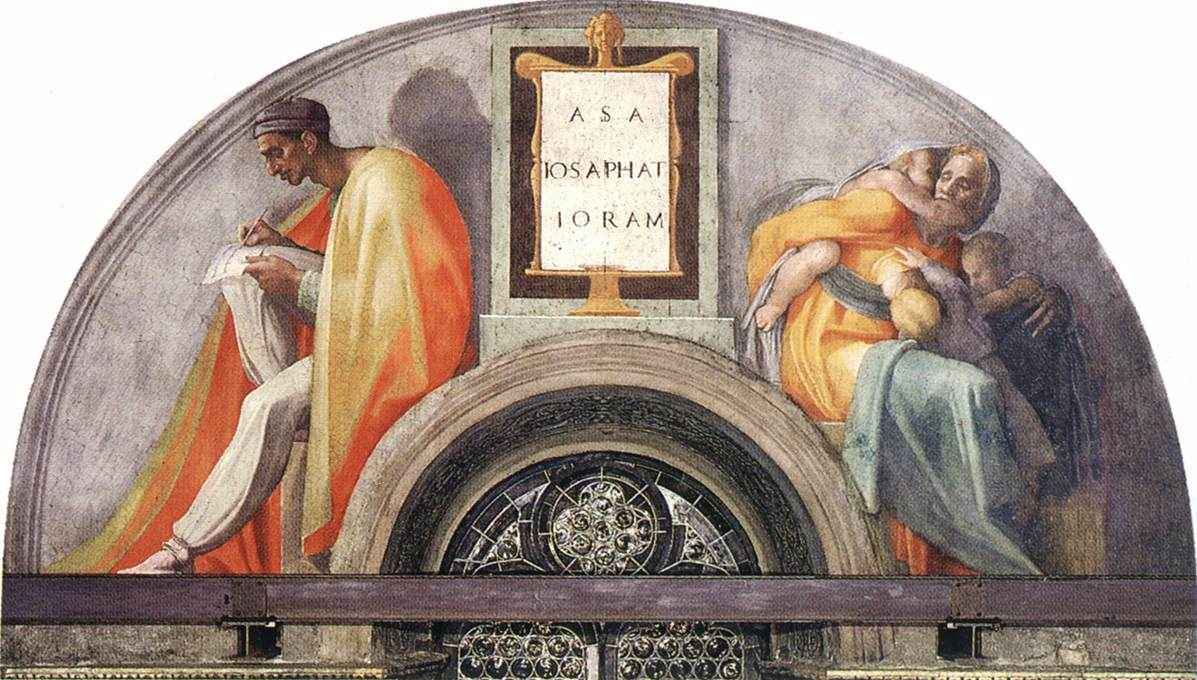
- Michelangelo's Asa-Jehoshaphat-Joram.jpg. The man on the left is generally considered to be Jehoshaphat.
- Book: Gospel of Matthew
- Christian Bible part: New Testament

Matthew 1:8 is the eighth verse of the first chapter of the Gospel of Matthew in the New Testament. The verse is part of the section where the genealogy of Joseph, the legal father of Jesus, is listed.

== Content ==
In the King James Version of the Bible the text reads:

And Asa begat Josaphat;
and Josaphat begat Joram;
and Joram begat Ozias;

The World English Bible translates the passage as:

Asa became the father of Jehoshaphat.
Jehoshaphat became the father of Joram.
Joram became the father of Uzziah.

For a collection of other versions see BibleHub Matthew 1:8.

== Analysis ==
The first part of this verse coincides with the list of the Kings of Judah that is present in a number of other parts of the Bible. According to William F. Albright, Asa of Judah ruled from 913 BC to 873 BC. His son Jehoshaphat ruled from 873 BC to 849 BC. His son Jehoram ruled from Jehoshaphat's death until 842 BC. However the other lists have Jehoram's son being Ahaziah while Uzziah is a monarch who comes several generations later.

This means that Matthew's genealogy skips Ahaziah, Athaliah, Jehoash, and Amaziah. Those who believe in the inerrancy of the Bible contend that the genealogy was never meant to be complete and the author of Matthew deliberately dropped those who were not needed from the list. Simply dropping unnecessary figures from genealogies was a common practice, and this is also done in several points in the Old Testament. One theory is that they were dropped because of their wickedness, but the even more unpleasant Manasseh is left in the list. All four were also murdered, but so was Amon, who also remains in place. Their reigns were also relatively short, but again there are other monarchs with shorter reigns included. Another theory says that names were omitted to achieve multiples of seven.

Robert H. Gundry supports the popular theory that these monarchs were left out because they were all descendants of Ahab, King of Israel through his daughter Athaliah. Ahab's descendants, the Omrides, were said to have been punished for four generations. Gundry also believes their removal was because the author was trying to divide the genealogy into the three lists of fourteen as mentioned in Matthew 1:17.

Albright and Mann have a different theory. They believe that the author, or a later scribe, confused Achaziah and Uzziah due to the similarity of the two rulers' names. In a common scribal transcription error, known as homoioteleuton, Uzziah was given Achaziah's position as the son of Jehoram but remained as father of Jotham. Under this theory the triple-fourteen parallelism was only created after this error appeared. Thus the comment in Matthew 1:17 would have had to have been added by a later editor and not the original author. Harold Fowler rejects this view, arguing that the error was so obvious when checked against the Old Testament that the change would quickly have been reversed if it were not deliberate.

== Bibliography ==
- Davies, W.D. and Dale C. Allison, Jr. A Critical and Exegetical Commentary on the Gospel According to Saint Matthew. Edinburgh : T. & T. Clark, 1988–1997.

Preceded by Matthew 1:7	Gospel of Matthew; Chapter 1	Succeeded by Matthew 1:9
