= Matthew 1:7 =

- ← 1:6 1:8 →
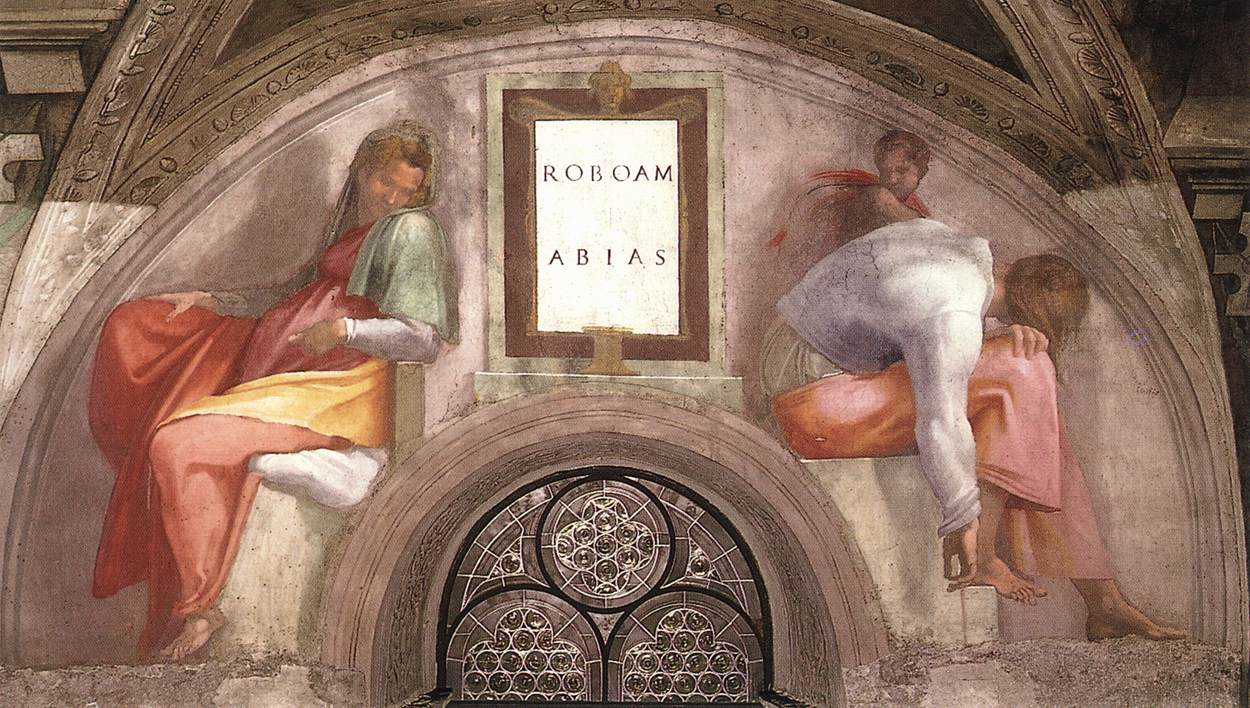
- Michelangelo's Rehoboam - Abijah.
- Book: Gospel of Matthew
- Christian Bible part: New Testament

Matthew 1:7 is the seventh verse of the first chapter of the Gospel of Matthew in the New Testament. The verse is part of the section where the genealogy of Joseph, the legal father of Jesus, is listed.

== Content ==
In the King James Version of the Bible the text reads:

And Solomon begat Roboam;
and Roboam begat Abia;
and Abia begat Asa;

The World English Bible translates the passage as:

Solomon became the father of Rehoboam.
Rehoboam became the father of Abijah.
Abijah became the father of Asa.

For a collection of other versions see BibleHub Matthew 1:7.

== Textual variants ==
The following textual variants are found in the manuscripts containing this verse:

=== Abia, Abias or Abioud ===
- "Abia": Ἀβιά, Ἀβιὰ] B Byz ς WH
- "Abias": Ἀβιά, Ἀβιὰς] א
- "Abeia": Ἀβειά, Ἀβειὰ] p^{1}
- "Abioud": Ἀβιούδ, Ἀβιοὺδ] (D it^{d} in Luke) f13 pc it syr^{h(mg)}

=== Asa or Asaph ===
- "Asaph": Ἀσάφ] p^{1} א B C (D it^{d} in Luke) f1 f13 205 700 1071 pm l^{253} l^{844} l^{2211} it^{aur} it^{c} it^{g1} it^{h} it^{q} vg^{mss} (syr^{h(mg)}) cop^{sa} cop^{mae} cop^{bo} arm eth geo Ambrose (Epiphanius^{1/2}) CEI TILC Nv
- "Asa": Ἀσά] E K L W Δ Π Σ 28 33 565 579 597 828 892 1006 1009 1010 1079 1195 1216 1230 1241 1242 1243 1342 1365 1424 1505 1546 (2148 Ἀσσά) Lect Byz (it^{a}) it^{f} it^{ff1} vg syr^{c} syr^{s} syr^{p} syr^{h} syr^{pal} slav Ps-Eustathius (Epiphanius^{1/2}) ς NR ND Riv Dio NM

== Analysis ==
This part of the list coincides with the list of the Kings of Judah that is present in a number of other parts of the Bible. Unlike other parts of Matthew's genealogy this list is fully in keeping with the other sources. The first listed is King Solomon of Israel who is said to have reigned c.962 BC to c.922 BC. The genealogy then follows is that of the kings of Judah, beginning with Rehoboam whose reign William F. Albright dates from 922 BC to 915 BC. Rehoboam's son Abijah (also written as "Abia") ruled from his father's death for two years and his son Asa of Judah ruled from 913 BC to 873 BC. Rehoboam is most noted for presiding over the breakup of his kingdom and a civil war between the tribes of Israel. His son Abijah had a brief and unsuccessful reign. Asa's long reign was more successful.

Robert H. Gundry believes that the addition of a "φ" to Asa's name is an attempt to link the king to Asaph, to whom Psalm 78 is attributed, while Psalm 78 contains important messianic prophecies. Raymond E. Brown, and most other scholars feel this is more likely an error than a scheme and most translators of the Bible "correct" Matthew in this verse. Who made the error is uncertain. The author of Matthew could have been working from an incorrect source, he could have made the error himself, or an early copier of the Gospel could have added the letter.

Preceded by Matthew 1:6	Gospel of Matthew; Chapter 1	Succeeded by Matthew 1:8
