= Matthew 1:5 =

- ← 1:4 1:6 →
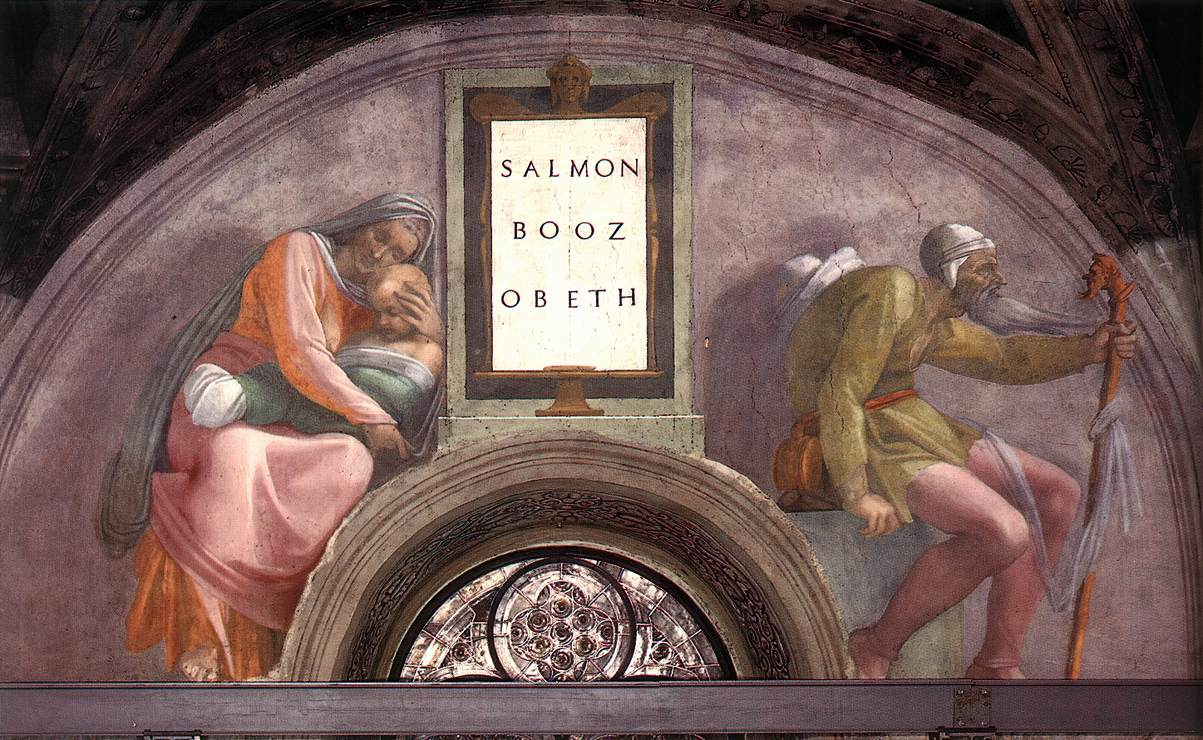
- Michelangelo's Salmon-Boaz-Obed. Boaz is generally seen as the old man on the right with Ruth on the left and the infant Obed on her knee.
- Book: Gospel of Matthew
- Christian Bible part: New Testament

Matthew 1:5 is the fifth verse of the first chapter in the Gospel of Matthew in the New Testament. The verse is part of the section where the genealogy of Joseph, the legal father of Jesus, is listed.

== Content ==
In the King James Version of the Bible the text reads:

And Salmon begat Boaz of Rachab;
and Boaz begat Obed of Ruth;
and Obed begat Jesse;

The World English Bible translates the passage as:

Salmon became the father of Boaz by Rahab.
Boaz became the father of Obed by Ruth.
Obed became the father of Jesse.

For a collection of other versions see BibleHub Matthew 1:5.

== Analysis ==
For a full discussion of the women mentioned in Matthew's genealogy, see Matthew 1:3#Analysis.

This genealogy matches that given in several other places in the Bible, including Luke 3:32. It covers the period after the Exodus to around the founding of the Kingdom of Israel. The passage carries the genealogy through Salmon, Boaz, Obed, and Jesse of which only Boaz is notable. It also mentions two women, Rahab and Ruth, both of whom are prominent Old Testament figures.

William F. Albright and C.S. Mann note that the author of Matthew spells Rahab's name as Rachab, a departure from the Septuagint spelling Matthew usually uses. The Rachab form also appears in the works of Josephus. They speculate that this indicates a change in pronunciation during this period. Another problem, pointed out by Raymond E. Brown, is that Rahab's position in this verse does not meet other traditions. No other source has her marrying Salmon and giving birth to Boaz. Jewish tradition has her as the wife of Joshua, and therefore living in a different time period.

== Resources ==
- Gundry, Robert H. Matthew a Commentary on his Literary and Theological Art. Grand Rapids: William B. Eerdmans Publishing Company, 1982.

Preceded by Matthew 1:4	Gospel of Matthew; Chapter 1	Succeeded by Matthew 1:6
