= Matthew 1:1 =

- ← Malachi 4 1:2 →
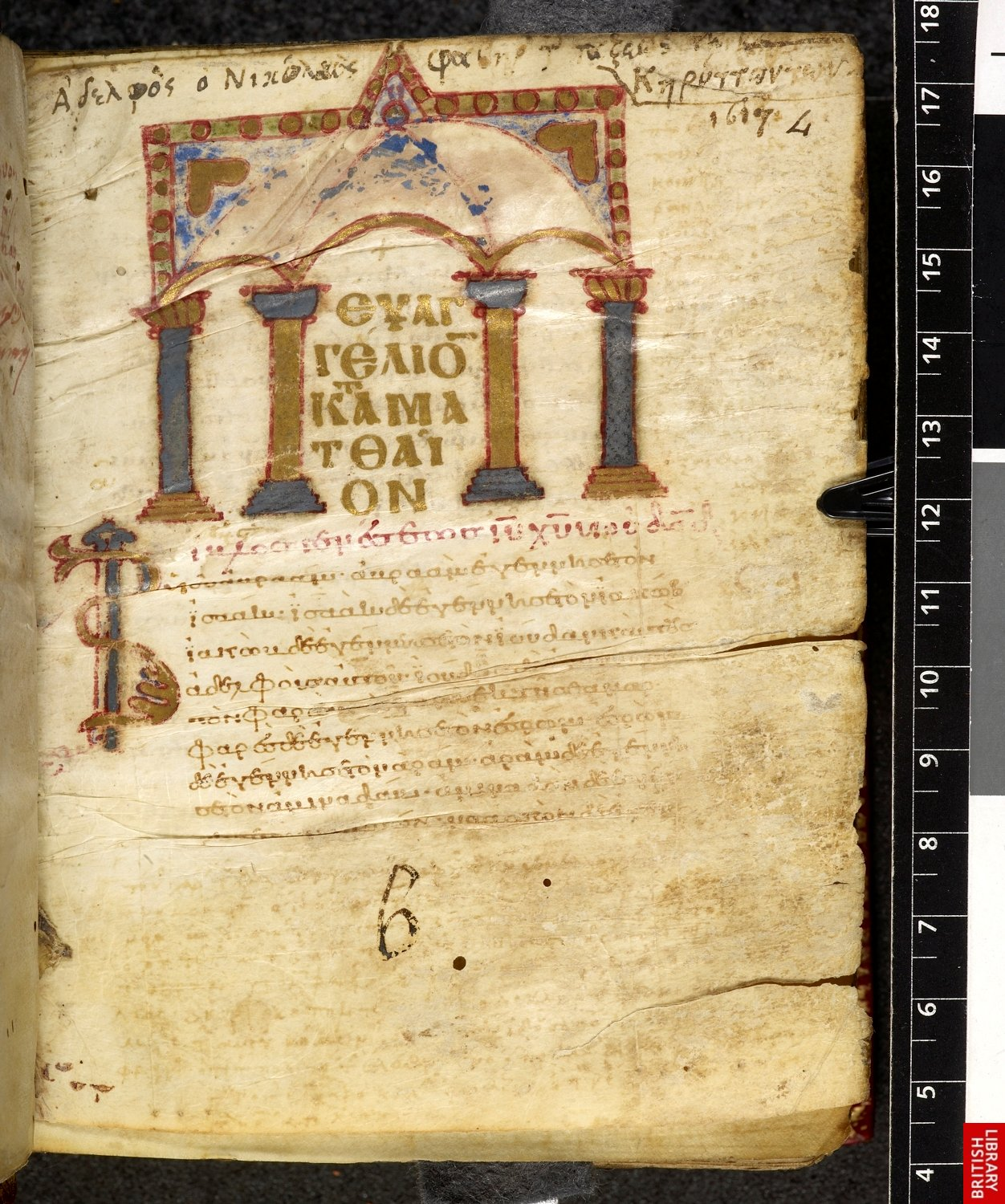
- The first page of the Gospel of Matthew in Codex Harleianus 5540 (Gregory-Aland 114); 11th century).
- Book: Gospel of Matthew
- Christian Bible part: New Testament

Matthew 1:1 is the opening verse in the first chapter of the Gospel of Matthew in the New Testament of the Christian Bible. Since Matthew is traditionally placed as the first of the four Gospels, this verse commonly serves as the opening to the entire New Testament.

== Content ==
The original Koine Greek, according to Westcott and Hort, reads:

βιβλος γενεσεως ιησου χριστου υιου δαυιδ υιου αβρααμ

An alternative spelling of David's name in the Textus Receptus is δαβιδ.

In the King James Version of the Bible this verse is translated as:

The book of the generation of Jesus Christ, the son of David, the son of Abraham.

The modern World English Bible translates this verse as:

The book of the genealogy of Jesus Christ, the son of David, the son of Abraham.

For a collection of other versions see Biblehub Matthew 1:1.

== Analysis ==
The opening of Matthew's Gospel fits with the theory of Markan priority. Scholars believe that the author of Matthew took Mark 1:1 "The beginning of the gospel of Jesus Christ, the Son of God", and replaced "the son of God" with the beginning of the genealogy.

The phrase "book of the genealogy" or biblos geneseos has several possible meanings. Most commonly it is seen as only referring to the list of ancestors that immediately follows, and most scholars agree that this interpretation is the most logical. However the phrase could also be translated more generally as "the book of coming" and could thus refer to the entire Gospel. Such opening phrases summarizing an entire work were common in an era before books had titles to serve this purpose. Jerome adopted this translation for the Vulgate. W. D. Davies and Dale Allison consider this to be the most likely meaning. "Book of the genealogy" is not a typical phrasing to introduce a genealogy. This phrase does appear in Genesis 5:1, but there it introduces a list of descendants rather than ancestors. The phrase also appears in Genesis 2:4, and there it has no relation to genealogies. Both verses in Genesis introduce elements of the creation story, and Davies and Allison feel it is likely that this verse is linked into the notion of a new genesis. They also point out that nowhere else in the New Testament does book refer to anything other than an entire work. Alternatively the phrase could have been deliberately created to serve the dual purpose of both introducing the entire work and the genealogy.

Raymond E. Brown mentions a third translation is "the book of the genesis brought about by Jesus" implying that it discusses the recreation of the world by Jesus. This stretches the grammar considerably, however. The term genesis was at the time the gospel was written already attached as the name of the first part of the Torah, so the use of the term here could be a deliberate reference. Geneseos also appears at Matthew 1:18, but there it is almost always translated as birth.

The now-common phrase "Jesus Christ" is used by the author of Matthew. What exactly is meant by this is much discussed. Christ, the Greek word for messiah, literally translates as "the anointed one". In modern times both titles apply exclusively to Jesus, but Matthew is not specific as to whether Jesus is the Christ or merely a Christ. In fact the form Matthew uses indicates that the word Christ is being used as a title, which is unusual as this is a usage only adopted some time after the death of Christ. Elsewhere Matthew uses "the Christ".

Davies and Allison note that both "son of David" and "son of Abraham" were titles in use in that era. "Son of David" was a common messianic title, while "son of Abraham" was not a messianic title, but an expression that could refer to any Jew, or "one worthy of him". Heinrich Meyer argues that David is designated as Abraham’s descendant through this wording, but the ultimate purpose is to show that Jesus was a descendant of David, this being essential to the presentation of Jesus as Messiah. According to Brown, some have theorized that David's name comes before Abraham's as the author of Matthew is trying to emphasize Jesus' Davidic ancestry. Brown doubts this, feeling the arrangement is merely to provide a lead into the genealogy that follows. Robert H. Gundry states that the structure of this passage attempts to portray Jesus as the culmination of the Old Testament genealogies.

Why the author of Matthew chooses to immediately begin his Gospel with a lengthy genealogy is an important question. As Fowler notes, the long list of names is of little interest to modern readers and potentially discourages people from reading further in the Gospel. Many editions of the Gospel essentially present it as beginning at Matthew 1:18 for this very reason. This disinterest would not have been true, however, to the Jewish audience towards whom the Gospel was directed. Lineage and descent were of great importance in Jewish society of the time, and a descent from David and Abraham was crucial to accepting Jesus as the Messiah. The names, at least in the first part of the genealogy, would have been well known to the readers. Some feminist scholars have posited that the prominent position of the genealogy is also an implicit reinforcement of the patriarchal nature of society. They argue that beginning the Gospel with a long string of "X father of Y" clearly exemplifies the masculine domination. Harold Fowler argues that the genealogy also serves to immediately humanize Jesus, by placing him clearly in the family of men.

== Commentary from Church Fathers ==
Irenaeus: "Now the Gospels, in which Christ is enthroned, are like these. ..... Matthew proclaims his human birth, saying, 'The book of the generation of Jesus Christ, son of David, son of Abraham,' and, 'The birth of Jesus Christ was in this manner' . for this Gospel is manlike, and so through the whole Gospel [Christ] appears as a man of a humble mind, and gentle."

Rabanus: "[Matthew] says, The book of the generation of Jesus Christ, because he knew it was written, The book of the generation of Adam. He begins thus then, that he may oppose book to book, the new Adam to the old Adam, for by the one were all things restored... By saying, of Jesus Christ. he expresses both the kingly and priestly office to be in Him, for Jesus (here referring to Joshua), who first bore this name, was after Moses, the first who was leader of the children of Israel; and Aaron, anointed by the mystical ointment, was the first priest under the Law."

Chrysostom: "And do not consider this genealogy a small thing to hear: for truly it is a marvellous thing that God should descend to be born of a woman, and to have as His ancestors David and Abraham."

Remigius: "Though any affirm that the prophet (Isaiah) does speak of His human generation, we need not answer to his enquiry Who shall declare it? "No man;" but, "Very few; because Matthew and Luke have."

Preceded by Old Testament	Gospel of Matthew; Chapter 1	Succeeded by Matthew 1:2
