= Matthew 1:2 =

- ← 1:1 1:3 →
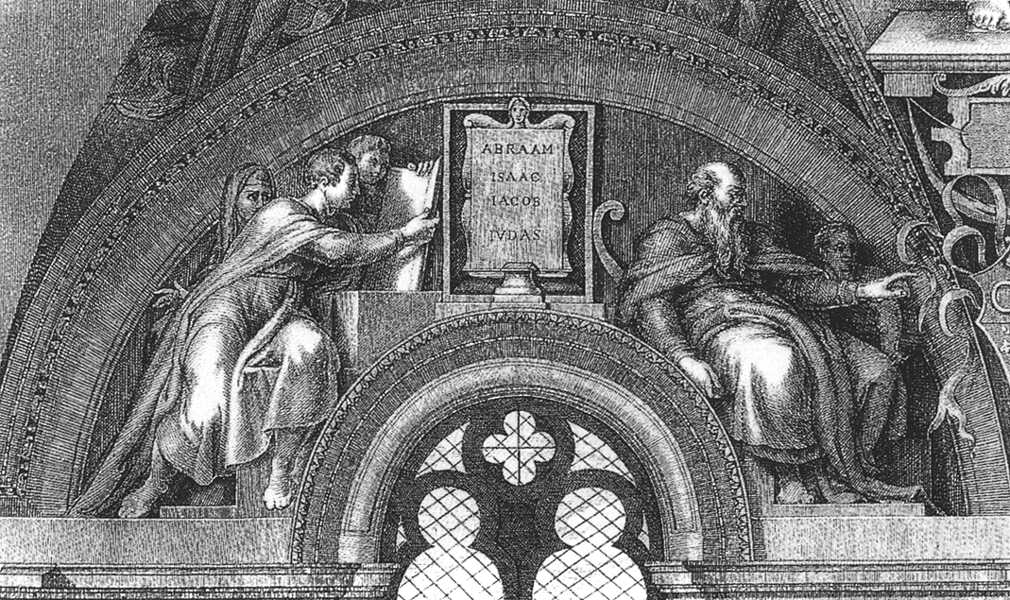
- A sketch of Michelangelo's destroyed Abraham - Isaac - Jacob - Judah.
- Book: Gospel of Matthew
- Christian Bible part: New Testament

Matthew 1:2 is the second verse of the first chapter in the Gospel of Matthew in the New Testament. The verse is the first part of the section where the genealogy of Joseph, the legal father of Jesus, is listed.

== Content ==
In the King James Version of the Bible the text reads:

Abraham begat Isaac;
and Isaac begat Jacob;
and Jacob begat Judas
and his brethren;

The World English Bible translates the passage as:

Abraham became the father of Isaac.
Isaac became the father of Jacob.
Jacob became the father of Judah
and his brothers.

For a collection of other versions see BibleHub Matthew 1:2.

== Analysis ==
The passage also references Judas or Judah's brothers, who have no actual place in the genealogy. Robert H. Gundry contends they are included because the author of Matthew is trying to portray the people of God as a brotherhood. Harold Fowler argues that while Isaac and Jacob's brothers were excluded from the promise of the messiah, all twelve of Judah's brothers were the ancestors of the tribe from which the messiah would come. The inclusion of the brothers is thus a reminder to the readers that it is from this group where the messiah will come.

W. D. Davies and Dale Allison note that Isaac's birth is a miraculous one according to the Old Testament, and thus there is some symmetry with both the first and last births mentioned in the genealogy being miraculous ones.

Preceded by Matthew 1:1	Gospel of Matthew; Chapter 1	Succeeded by Matthew 1:3
