= Matthew 1:9 =

- ← 1:8 1:10 →
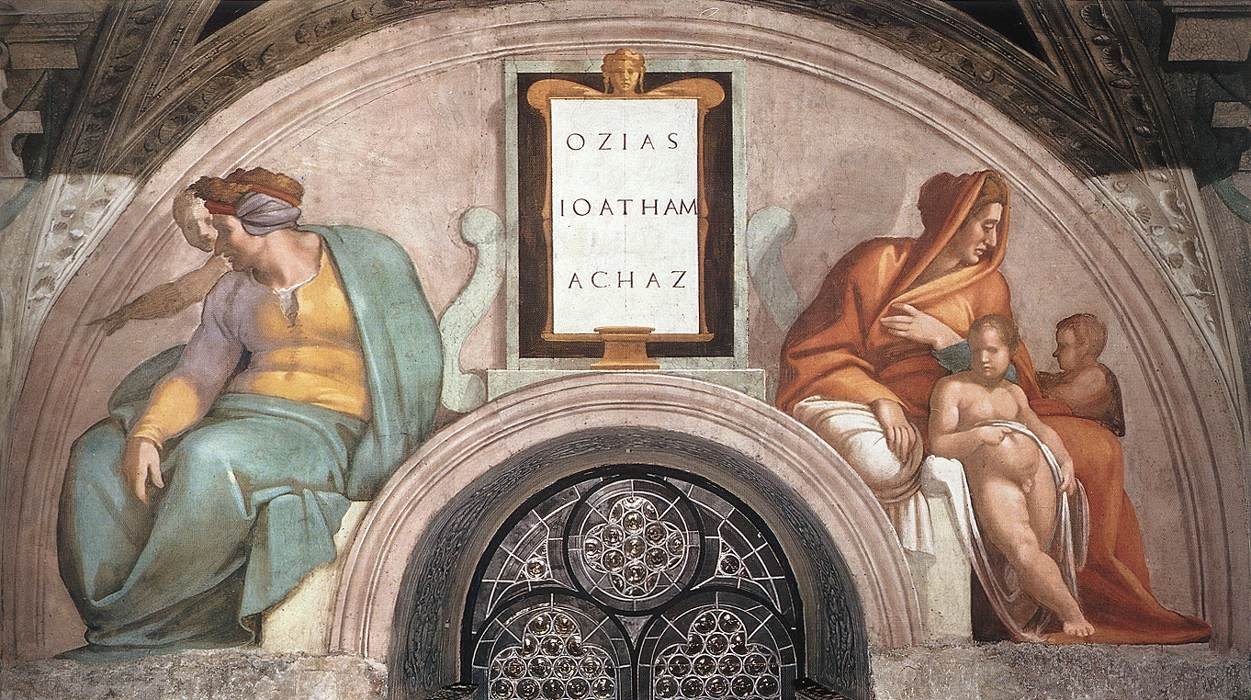
- Michelangelo's Uzziah-Jotham-Ahaz. Traditionally Jotham is the man in green on the left and the child with him is his son Ahaz.
- Book: Gospel of Matthew
- Christian Bible part: New Testament

Matthew 1:9 is the ninth verse of the first chapter of the Gospel of Matthew in the Bible. The verse is part of the non-synoptic section where the genealogy of Joseph, the legal father of Jesus, is listed, or on non-Pauline interpretations the genealogy of Jesus. The purpose of the genealogy is to show descent from the line of kings, in particular David, as the Messiah was predicted to be the son of David (2 Samuel 7:12; Psalm 89:3, 132:11, among others), and descendant of Abraham (Genesis 12:3; 22:18).

== Content ==
In the King James Version of the Bible the text reads:

And Ozias begat Jotham;
and Joatham begat Achaz;
and Achaz begat Ezekias;

The World English Bible translates the passage as:

Uzziah became the father of Jotham.
Jotham became the father of Ahaz.
Ahaz became the father of Hezekiah.

For a collection of other versions see BibleHub Matthew 1:9.

=== Greek text ===
The Koine Greek Byzantine text or majority text, and the textus receptus both read:

- οζιας δε εγεννησε τον ιωαθαμ ιωαθαμ δε εγεννησε τον αχαζ αχαζ δε εγεννησε τον εζεκιαν.

Constantin von Tischendorf gives rather Οζειας for the first king.

Westcott-Hort offers the main reading and also a variant αχας for the third king.

Nestle-Aland has εγεννησεν instead of εγεννησε.

=== Vulgate (Latin) text ===
The Latin Vulgate of Jerome gives:

Ozias autem genuit Ioatham Ioatham autem genuit Achaz Achaz autem genuit Ezechiam.

=== Peshitta text ===
The Peshitta text is substantially different, translated it is:

Awazea fathered Yoram Yoram fathered Yahoshapat fathered Khizaqea.

== Analysis ==
This part (the second section - David to the Babylon Removal - as summarized in Matthew 1:17) of the list of Jesus' ancestry coincides with the list of the Kings of Judah that can be constructed from Old Testament records of Bible. Unlike other parts of Matthew's genealogy this list is fully in keeping with the other Jewish sources. Thomas Long sees this as Matthew's method to disclose the true identity of Jesus to his Jewish-Christian readers, that Jesus is 'the culmination of Israel's history', and 'the embodiment of their hunger for a true and perfect king'. Uzziah, was King of Judah (809 BC - 759 BC) (Amos 1:1). According to William F. Albright, Jotham ruled from 742 BC until 735 BC and his son Ahaz ruled from his death until 715 BC, whereas Ahaz's son Hezekiah ruled from 715 BC to 687 BC. Hezekiah was the king whose actions prompted the Babylonians to take the Jews into captivity, as prophesied in Isaiah 38 and mentioned in the genealogy at Verse 11. Hezekiah had fifteen years added to his lifespan by God, due to his piety.

These kings are also listed in 2 Kings 14-16, together with narrative about their reigns.

== The kings in Matthew 1:9 ==
The people mentioned in this section of the genealogy are all Kings of Judah.

=== Family tree ===
Line of the Kings Matthew 1:8
Ozias (Matthew 1:8)
Jotham
Achaz, (2 Kings 15:38)
Hezekiah, (2 Kings 16:20)
Line of the kings (Matthew 1:10)

Zadok
= Jerushah (2 Kings 15:33)
Zachariah
= Abi (2 Kings 18:2)

== Archaeology ==
In the mid-1990s a bulla, .4 inches (10 mm) wide, was found with an inscription: "Belonging to Ahaz (son of) Yehotam, King of Judah." This so-call "King Ahaz's Seal" is regarded to be authentic.

Stamped bulla sealed by a servant of King Hezekiah, formerly pressed against a cord; unprovenanced Redondo Beach collection of antiquities

The Tiglath-Pileser III annals mentions tributes and payments he received from Ahaz, king of Judah and Menahem, king of Israel.

There are extra-biblical sources that specify Hezekiah by name, along with his reign and influence, that "[h]istoriographically, his reign is noteworthy for the convergence of a variety of biblical sources and diverse extrabiblical evidence often bearing on the same events. Significant data concerning Hezekiah appear in the Deuteronomistic History, the Chronicler, Isaiah, Assyrian annals and reliefs, Israelite epigraphy, and, increasingly, stratigraphy". Hezekiah's story is one of the best to cross-reference with the rest of the Mid Eastern world's historical documents.

In 2015 in a dig at the Ophel in Jerusalem, Eilat Mazar discovered a royal bulla of Hezekiah, that reads "Belonging to Hezekiah [son of] Ahaz king of Judah", and dates to between 727 - 698 BC. This is the first seal impression of an Israelite or Judean king to come to light in a scientific archaeological excavation. The impression on this inscription was set in ancient Hebrew script.

A lintel inscription, found over the doorway of a tomb, has been ascribed to his secretary, Shebnah (2 Kings 18:18). LMLK stored jars along the border with Assyria "demonstrate careful preparations to counter Sennacherib's likely route of invasion" and show "a notable degree of royal control of towns and cities which would facilitate Hezekiah's destruction of rural sacrificial sites and his centralization of worship in Jerusalem". Evidence suggests they were used throughout his 29-year reign (Grena, 2004, p. 338). There are some Bullae from sealed documents that may have belonged to Hezekiah himself (Grena, 2004, p. 26, Figs. 9 and 10). There are also some that name his servants (ah-vah-deem in Hebrew, ayin-bet-dalet-yod-mem).

Archaeological findings like the Hezekiah seal led scholars to surmise that the ancient Judahite kingdom had a highly developed administrative system. The reign of Hezekiah saw a notable increase in the power of the Judean state. At this time Judah was the strongest nation on the Assyrian-Egyptian frontier. There were increases in literacy and in the production of literary works. The massive construction of the Broad Wall was made during his reign, the city was enlarged to accommodate a large influx, and population increased in Jerusalem up to 25,000, "five times the population under Solomon," Archaeologist Amihai Mazar explains, "Jerusalem was a virtual city-state where the majority of the state's population was concentrated," in comparison to the rest of Judah's cities (167).

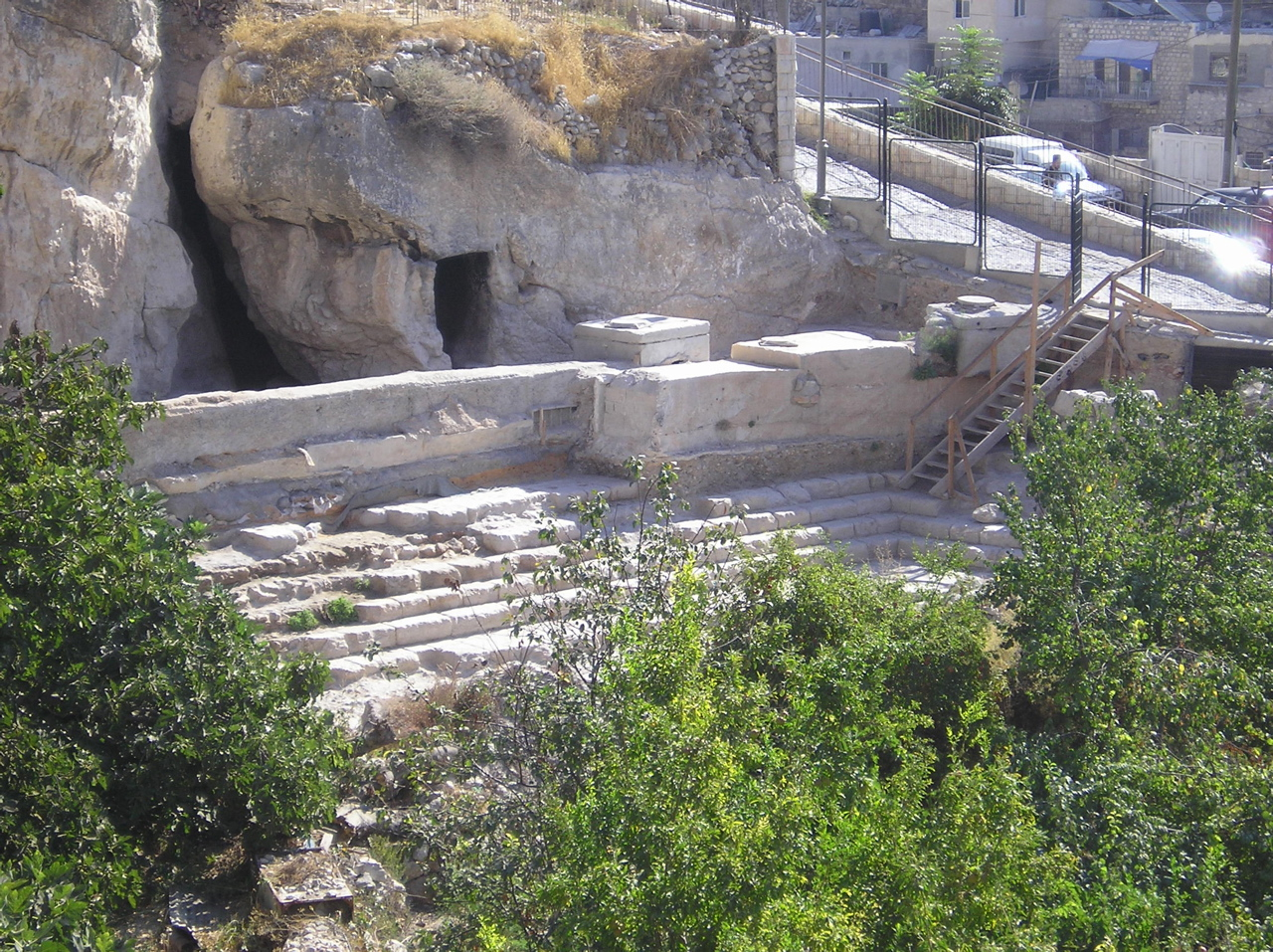
Siloam pool

The Siloam Tunnel was chiseled through 533 meters (1,750 feet) of solid rock in order to provide Jerusalem underground access to the waters of the Gihon Spring or Siloam Pool, which lay outside the city. The Siloam Inscription from the Siloam Tunnel is now in the Istanbul Archaeology Museum. It "commemorates the dramatic moment when the two original teams of tunnelers, digging with picks from opposite ends of the tunnel, met each other" (564). It is "[o]ne of the most important ancient Hebrew inscriptions ever discovered." Finkelstein and Mazar cite this tunnel as an example of Jerusalem's impressive state-level power at the time.

Archaeologists like William G. Dever have pointed at archaeological evidence for the iconoclasm during the period of Hezekiah's reign. The central cult room of the temple at Arad (a royal Judean fortress) was deliberately and carefully dismantled, "with the altars and massebot" concealed "beneath a Str. 8 plaster floor". This stratum correlates with the late 8th century; Dever concludes that "the deliberate dismantling of the temple and its replacement by another structure in the days of Hezekiah is an archeological fact. I see no reason for skepticism here."

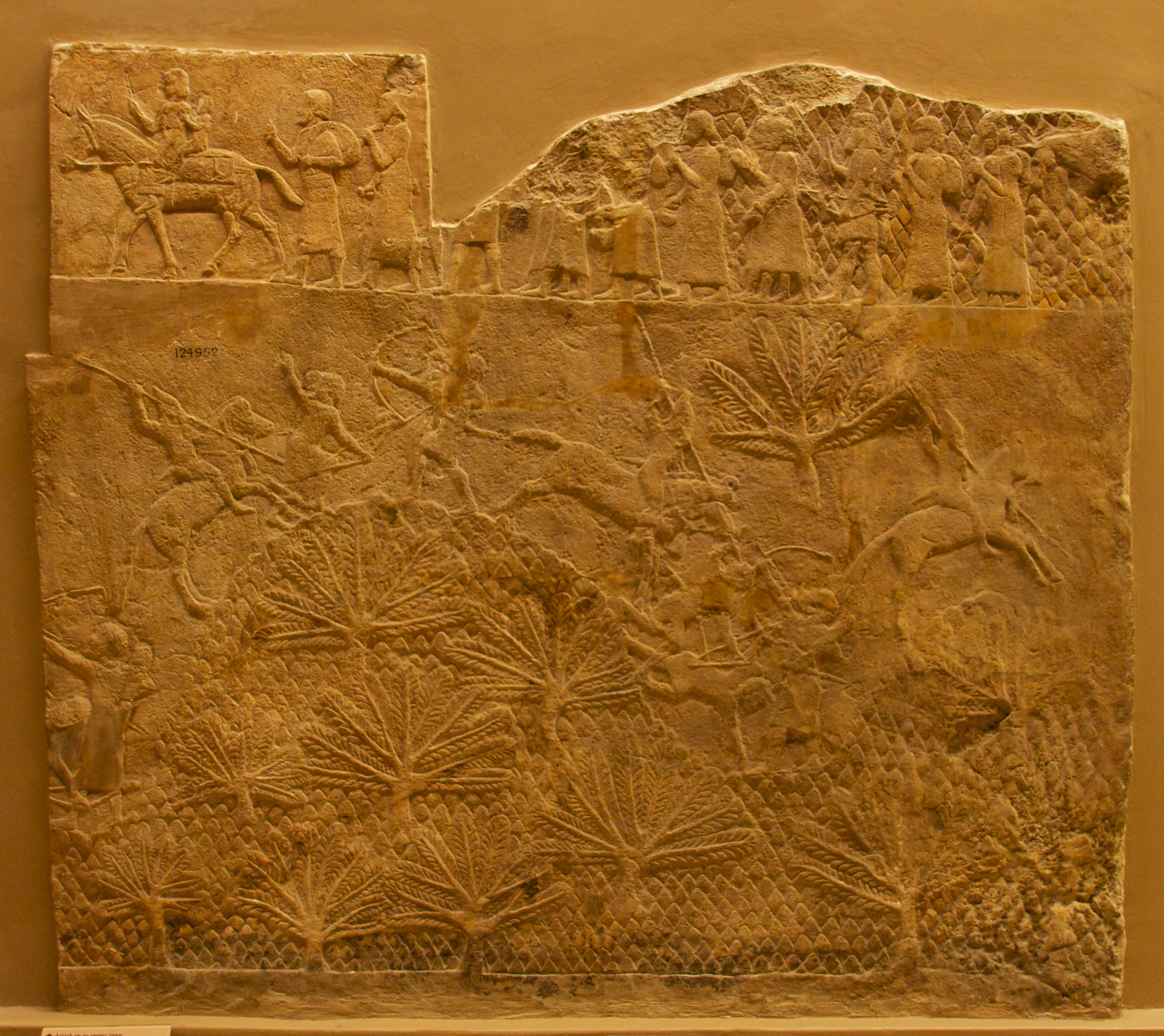
Part of the Lachish Relief, British Museum. Battle scene, showing Assyrian cavalry in action. Above, prisoners are led away.

During the revolt of king Hezekiah against Assyria, city of Lachish was captured by Sennacherib despite determined resistance (see Siege of Lachish). As the Lachish relief attests, Sennacherib began his siege of the city of Lachish in 701 BC. The Lachish Relief graphically depicts the battle, and the defeat of the city, including Assyrian archers marching up a ramp and Judahites pierced through on mounted stakes. "The reliefs on these slabs" discovered in the Assyrian palace at Nineveh "originally formed a single, continuous work, measuring 8 feet ... tall by 80 feet ... long, which wrapped around the room" (559). Visitors "would have been impressed not only by the magnitude of the artwork itself but also by the magnificent strength of the Assyrian war machine."

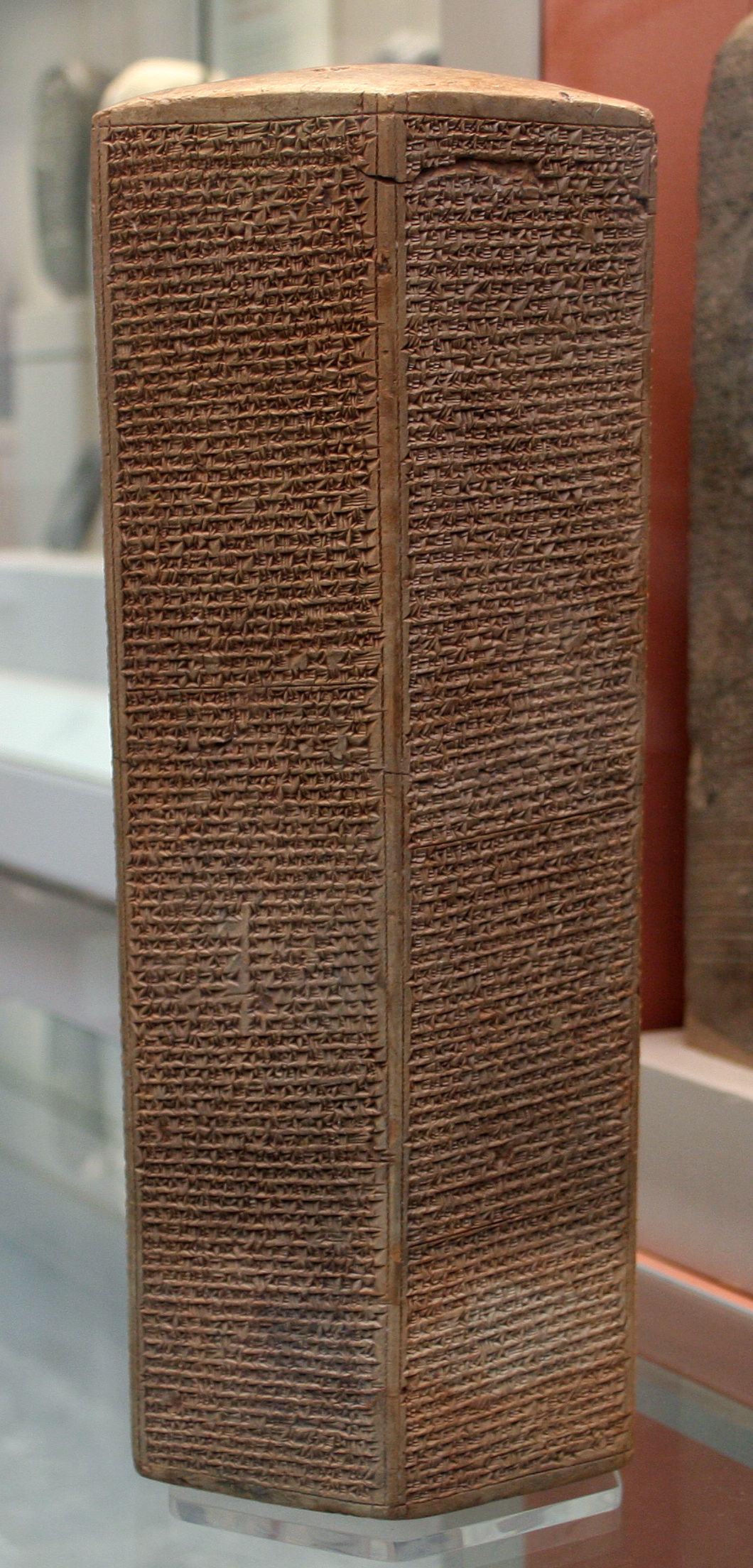
Taylor Prism, London

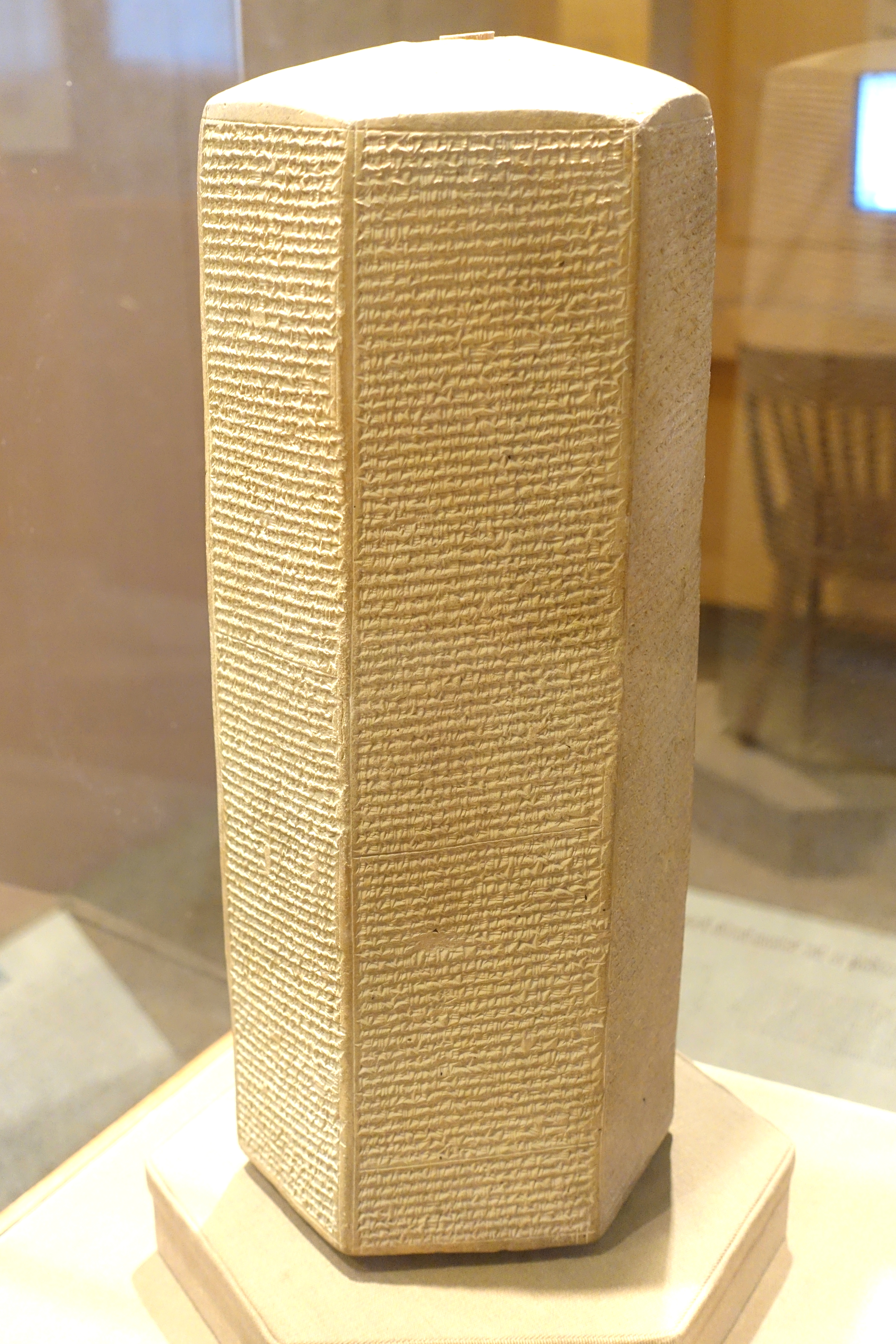
Oriental Institute Prism, Chicago

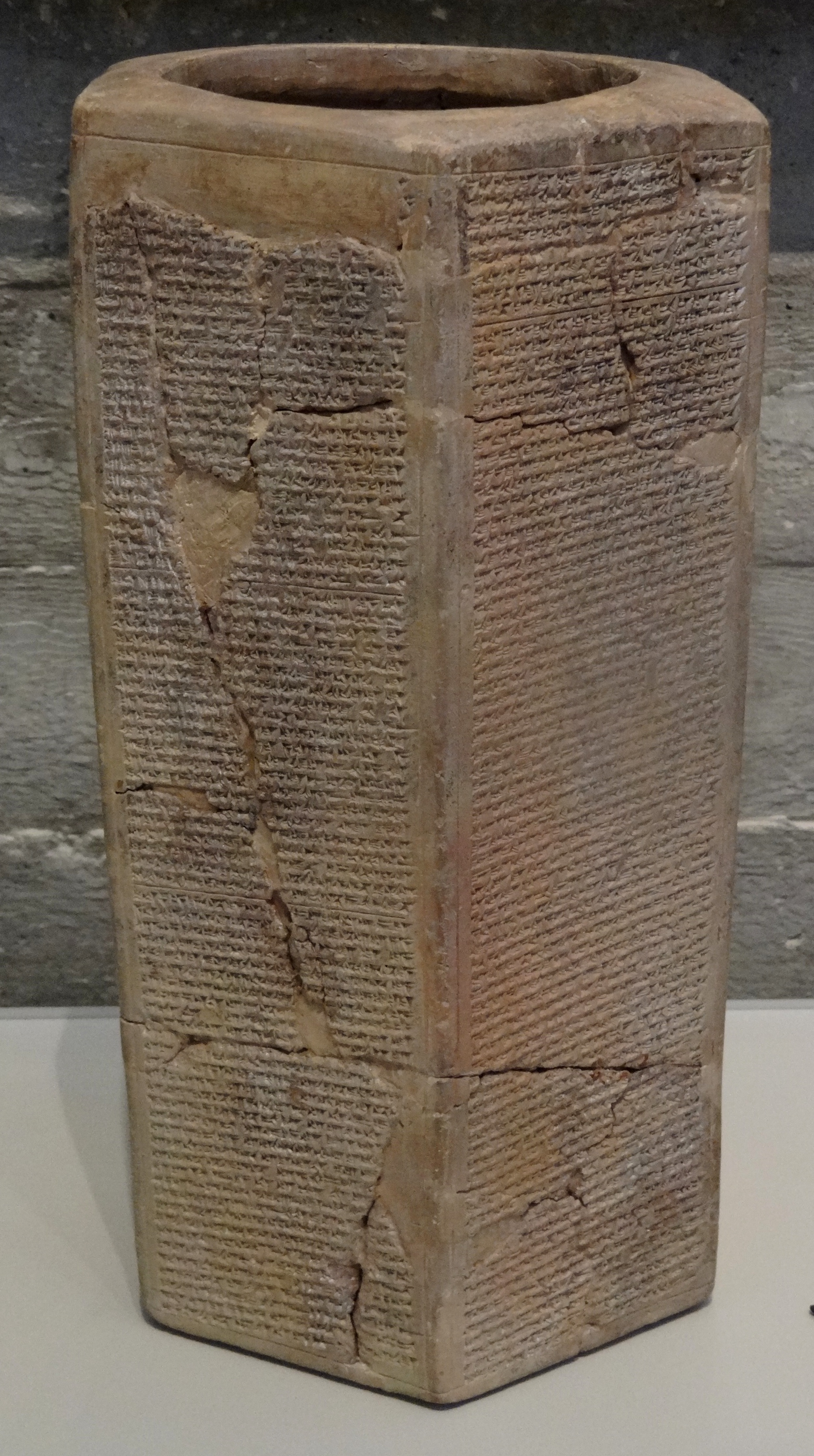
Jerusalem Prism, Israel

Sennacherib's Annals of his military campaign (704-681 BC), including his invasion into the Kingdom of Judah

Sennacherib's Prism was found buried in the foundations of the Nineveh palace. It was written in cuneiform, the Mesopotamian form of writing of the day. The prism records the conquest of 46 strong towns and "uncountable smaller places," along with the siege of Jerusalem during Hezekiah's reign where Sennacherib says he just "shut him up...like a bird in a cage," subsequently enforcing a larger tribute upon him.

The Hebrew Bible states that during the night, the angel of Jehovah (YHWH Hebrew) brought death to 185,000 Assyrians troops (2 Kings 19:35), forcing the army to abandon the siege, yet it also records a tribute paid to Sennacherib of 300 silver talents following the siege. There is no account of the supernatural event in the prism. Sennacherib's account records his levying of a tribute from Hezekiah, the king of Judea, who was within Jerusalem, leaving the city as the only one intact following the exile of the northern ten-tribe kingdom of Israel due to idolatry. (2 Kings 17:22,23; 2 Kings 18:1-8) Sennacherib recorded a payment of 800 silver talents, which suggests a capitulation to end the siege. However, Inscriptions have been discovered describing Sennacherib’s defeat of the Ethiopian forces. These say: “As to Hezekiah, the Jew, he did not submit to my yoke, I laid siege to 46 of his strong cities . . . and conquered (them) . . . Himself I made a prisoner in Jerusalem, his royal residence, like a bird in a cage.” (Ancient Near Eastern Texts, p. 288) He does not claim to have captured the city. This is consistent with the Bible account of Hezekiah’s revolt against Assyria in the sense that neither account seems to indicate that Sennacherib ever entered or formally captured the city. Sennacherib in this inscription claims that Hezekiah paid for tribute 800 talents of silver, in contrast with the Bible’s 300, however this could be due to boastful exaggeration which was not uncommon amongst kings of the period. Furthermore, the annals record a list of booty sent from Jerusalem to Nineveh. In the inscription, Sennacherib claims that Hezekiah accepted servitude, and some theorize that Hezekiah remained on his throne as a vassal ruler. The campaign is recorded with differences in the Assyrian records and in the biblical Books of Kings; there is agreement that the Assyrian have a propensity for exaggeration.

One theory that takes the biblical view posits that a defeat was caused by "possibly an outbreak of the bubonic plague". Another that this is a composite text which makes use of a 'legendary motif' analogous to that of the Exodus story.

== See also ==
- 1 Chronicles 3:11
- 2 Chronicles 26-28
- Book of Isaiah:
  - Isaiah 7:1 "And it came to pass in the days of Ahaz the son of Jotham, the son of Uzziah..."
  - Isaiah 7:14 Messianic prophecy.
- 2 Kings 15-16
- Hebrews 7:14 "For it is evident that our Lord sprang out of Juda; of which tribe Moses spake nothing concerning priesthood."

== Sources ==
- Bruce, F.F. (2014). Matthew. Vol. 1. BookBaby. ISBN 9781909680296.
- Grabbe, Lester (2003). Like a Bird in a Cage: The Invasion of Sennacherib in 701 BCE. A&C Black. ISBN 9780826462152.
- Grayson, A.K. (1991). "Assyria: Sennacherib and Essarhaddon". In Boardman, John; Edwards, I. E. S. (eds.). The Cambridge Ancient History, Volume III Part II. Cambridge University Press. ISBN 9780521227179.
- Long, Thomas G. (1997). Matthew. Westminster Bible companion. Westminster John Knox Press. ISBN 9780664252571.

Preceded by Matthew 1:8	Gospel of Matthew; Chapter 1	Succeeded by Matthew 1:10
