= Jacob (father of Joseph of Nazareth) =

New Testament biblical figure

Father of St. Joseph, Grandfather of Jesus
- Born: 1st century BC
- Died: 1st century BC (before the birth of Jesus)
- Venerated in: Eastern Orthodox Church
- Feast: Sunday of the Holy Forefathers

Jacob (Greek: Ἰακώβ, Hebrew: יַעֲקֹב) is a biblical figure from the New Testament. According to the Genealogy of Jesus presented in the Gospel of Matthew, he was the son of Matthan, the father of St. Joseph, and the grandfather of Jesus Christ. He most likely lived in the 1st century BC, during the era of the Maccabean (Hasmonean) state.

== Biblical accounts ==
The figure of Jacob is mentioned exclusively in the first chapter of the Gospel of Matthew:

Eliud became the father of Eleazar, Eleazar the father of Matthan, Matthan the father of Jacob. Jacob was the father of Joseph, the husband of Mary. Of her was born Jesus who is called the Messiah.

— Mt 1:15-16 (NABRE)

In the structure of Matthew's genealogy, deliberately divided into three epochs of 14 generations, Jacob is the second-to-last link (before Joseph) in the third and final group covering the time from the Babylonian captivity to the birth of Christ (Mt 1:17). Exegetes point out that it is precisely at Jacob's generation that Matthew's active chain of fatherhood ends. Jacob begets Joseph, but regarding Jesus himself, Joseph is only called the "husband of Mary, of whom was born Jesus," which in Christian tradition is interpreted as proof of the virgin birth (denying Joseph biological fatherhood).

The problem of St. Joseph's paternity arises when comparing Matthew's text with the Gospel of Luke. Luke provides a different genealogy, indicating that Joseph's father was Heli:

When Jesus began his ministry he was about thirty years of age. He was the son, as was thought, of Joseph, the son of Heli,

— Lk 3:23 (NABRE)

== Interpretations of genealogical differences ==
In Christian tradition and Biblical studies, the discrepancy between the texts explaining who Joseph's father was (Jacob or Heli) is resolved in two main ways:

=== Levirate law ===
The oldest surviving explanation for this discrepancy was provided in the 3rd century by the early Christian historian Sextus Julius Africanus in his Epistle to Aristides. This ancient Greek source, preserved by Eusebius of Caesarea, records the family tradition regarding a woman named Estha. She first married Matthan (from Solomon's line) and gave birth to Jacob. After Matthan's death, she married Melchi (from Nathan's line) and gave birth to Heli. Africanus explains how this led to the levirate marriage between Jacob and Heli's widow:

Thus we shall find the two, Jacob and Eli, uterine brothers, though of different families. Of these, the one, Jacob, when his brother Eli died childless, took the latter's wife and begot by her a third, Joseph, his own son by nature (and in accordance with reason. Wherefore also it is written: 'Jacob begot Joseph'). But by law he was the son of Eli, for Jacob, being the brother of the latter, raised up seed to him.

— Sextus Julius Africanus, preserved in Eusebius, Church History, 1:7:11

According to this explanation based on the Old Testament levirate law (Deut 25:5-6), Jacob was the biological father of Joseph (which Matthew's account reflects), while Heli was his father in the eyes of the law (which Luke's account shows). In this concept, both genealogies refer directly to St. Joseph.

The following tree illustrates the family relationships taking into account the tradition of the levirate law given by Julius Africanus (the dashed line indicates a legal relationship and a childless marriage):

Matthan	Estha	Melchi
Jacob (biological father)	unnamed widow (of Heli)	Heli (legal father)
Joseph	Mary
Jesus Christ

=== Theory of two different lines (son-in-law theory) ===
According to the opinion of some Christian writers and theologians (a theory popularized by Annius of Viterbo, as well as scholars in later centuries), Luke presented the genealogy of Mary's line, while Matthew presented Joseph's genealogy. In this interpretation, Heli was the biological father of Mary. Early Church traditions, such as that of St. Jerome, identified Heli with St. Joachim, suggesting that Joachim is a variant of Eliakim and Heli is an abbreviated form. By entering into marriage with Mary, Joseph legally became Heli's son-in-law. Because women were generally not listed in Jewish genealogies, St. Luke inserted Joseph in her place. However, many modern scholars approach this theory with caution, pointing out that women's genealogies were not preserved in antiquity, and Luke's genealogy does not explicitly name Mary as an ancestor.

The following tree illustrates the relationship in which the Gospel of Luke describes Mary's ancestors (Heli), and the Gospel of Matthew describes Joseph's ancestors (Jacob):

Jacob (Joseph's father)	Heli (Mary's father)
Joseph	Mary
Jesus Christ

== In Catholic theology ==
In the Catholic Church, the figure of Jacob is significant due to Josephology (the branch of Dogmatic theology dealing with the person of St. Joseph). Theologians point out that it is precisely through Jacob's line that St. Joseph inherits the royal rights of the House of David.

According to Christian belief, although the father of Jesus is God the Father, and his conception in the womb of Mary took place by the power of the Holy Spirit, earthly lineage played a role in salvation history. Because Jacob, according to Matthew, is a descendant of King Solomon, he passes on the status of heir to the messianic promises to Joseph. In Catholic theology, it is emphasized that Joseph, by giving Jesus his name and legally adopting him, incorporates him into the House of David through Jacob's line. In this way, the messianic prophecies about a Savior originating from the Davidic line are fulfilled.

== Biblical typology ==
Many biblical scholars note that the presence of the name "Jacob" as Joseph's father in Matthew has very deep typological significance. The evangelist deliberately builds a parallel between the New and Old Testaments:

- In the Old Testament, the patriarch Jacob had a beloved son named Joseph (see Joseph of Egypt). Similarly, in the New Testament, the father of Joseph of Nazareth is Jacob. Scholars suggest Joseph was named directly in honor of the patriarch's son.
- Both the Old Testament Joseph and the New Testament St. Joseph received revelations from God through dreams (cf. Gen 37:5: "Once Joseph had a dream" and Mt 1:20: "the angel of the Lord appeared to him in a dream").
- Both were forced to go to Egypt due to a threat, and both saved their families in this way.

== See also ==
- Genealogy of Jesus
- God the Father
- Heli (biblical figure)
- Holy Family
- Holy Spirit
- Jesus
- Josephology
- Mary, mother of Jesus
- Saint Joseph
- Tree of Jesse
