= Matthew 1:17 =

- ← 1:16 1:18 →
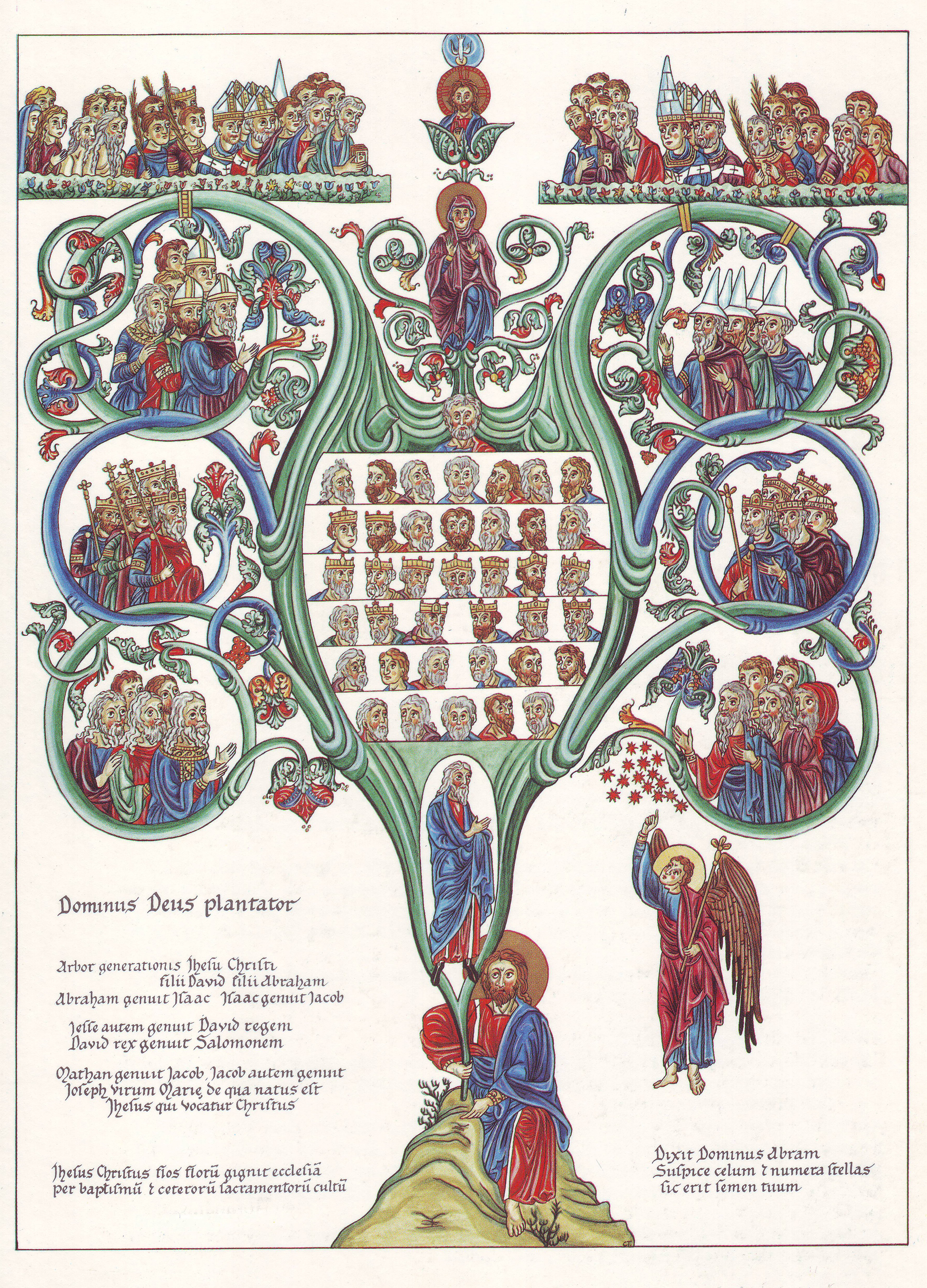
- The family tree of Christ, Hortus Deliciarum (1180)
- Book: Gospel of Matthew
- Christian Bible part: New Testament

Matthew 1:17 is the seventeenth verse of the first chapter in the Gospel of Matthew in the New Testament. The verse is the conclusion to the section where the genealogy of Joseph, the earthly father of Jesus, is listed.

== Text ==
The original Koine Greek, according to Westcott and Hort, reads:

πασαι ουν αι γενεαι απο αβρααμ εως δαυιδ γενεαι δεκατεσσαρες και απο
δαυιδ εως της μετοικεσιας βαβυλωνος γενεαι δεκατεσσαρες και απο της
μετοικεσιας βαβυλωνος εως του χριστου γενεαι δεκατεσσαρες

In the King James Version of the Bible the text reads:

So all the generations from Abraham to David are fourteen generations; and
from David until the carrying away into Babylon are fourteen generations;
and from the carrying away into Babylon unto Christ are fourteen generations.

The World English Bible translates the passage as:

So all the generations from Abraham to David are fourteen generations; from
David to the exile to Babylon fourteen generations; and from the carrying
away to Babylon to the Christ, fourteen generations.

For a collection of other versions see BibleHub Matthew 1:17.

== Reasons for the summary ==
The numbers may be linked to Daniel 9:24–27, which states that seventy weeks of years, or 490 years, would pass between the restoration of Jerusalem and the coming of the messiah. Since generations were commonly placed at 35 years, this means exactly 14 generations. W. D. Davies and Dale Allison also note that this might be linked to the lunar calendar. The lunar month is 28 days, 14 days of waxing and 14 days of waning. Thus the first grouping could be the initial waxing to David, the next fourteen the waning to the Babylonian captivity and the last period the waxing towards Jesus.

The number 14 is itself important. It is twice 7, which was considered a holy number. David's name, when turned into numbers, adds up to fourteen. 3 groups of 14 is the same as 6 groups of 7. W. D. Davies and Dale Allison mention a theory that the first six periods reflect the first six days of the week; with Jesus begins the seventh day, that of the eternal Sabbath. Matthew's enumeration may be an average estimate of the periodical generations in Israel's history, but probably to imply that Israel was due for the coming of its Messiah with the birth of Jesus, just as in the case with the new Elijah in Matthew 3:4.

Some interpretations focus on the symbolism of the number fourteen without accounting for the aspect of three.

The three series of fourteens divide the generations into three distinct periods, by beginning and ending four significant points of time (Abraham; King David; Babylonian Exile; Messiah) thereby noting three beginning points and three end points (the middle two points, by overlapping periods, function doubly as end points and beginning points).

The aspect of three (either three groups or three beginning points and three end points) may be meant to be as significant as the number fourteen.

More than fifteen interpretations of the genealogical summary have been suggested throughout the history of interpretation.

== Missing person ==
However, there are some complications with this passage. There are 42 generations listed (including Tamar, verse 3 and Genesis 38:6-30) but only 41 men's names listed, whereas one would expect 14 x 3 or 42. This certainly appears to leave one of the divisions a member short.

Abraham to David

1. Abraham
2. Isaac
3. Jacob
4. Judah
5. Perez
6. Hezron
7. Aram
8. Amminadab
9. Nahshon
10. Salmon
11. Boaz
12. Obed
13. Jesse
14. David

David to Babylonian Exile

1. David
2. Solomon
3. Rehoboam
4. Abijam
5. Asa
6. Jehoshaphat
7. Joram
8. Uzziah
9. Jotham
10. Ahaz
11. Hezekiah
12. Manasseh
13. Amon
14. Josiah, birth of his son Jeconiah at the time of the Babylonian exile

Babylonian Exile to Jesus

1. Jeconiah, died in Babylon
2. Shealtiel
3. Zerubbabel
4. Abiud
5. Eliakim
6. Azor
7. Zadok
8. Achim
9. Eliud
10. Eleazar
11. Matthan
12. Jacob
13. Joseph
14. Jesus

A number of explanations have been advanced to explain this. Other than the straightforward reason of simple miscounting, the significant view, first advocated by Krister Stendahl, which would preserve the inerrancy of the Bible, is that David's name should appear twice just as it is mentioned twice in the verse. By this count he is both one of the fourteen from "Abraham to David" and also one of the fourteen from "David to the exile to Babylon." The main problem with this is that it would also suggest that since the exile to Babylon is mentioned twice the man at this time, Jeconiah, should also appear twice. Other theories that have been advanced include that Mary counts as one of the 14 or that Jeconiah legally counts as two separate people, one as king the other as dethroned civilian.

An explanation that scholars today find more probable is that the problem lies in Matthew 1:11. Almost all other sources report that a king named Jehoiakim was between Josiah and Jeconiah. A biblical reference for this may be seen in I Chronicles 3:15-16. Many scholars feel it is likely that Jeconiah, whose name can be spelt Jehoiachin, was confused with his father and they were merged into one person. Thus the error was one by a later transcriber.

However there are several other people who were left out of the genealogy. Matthew 1:8 skips over Ahaziah, Athaliah, Jehoash, and Amaziah, two of whom were kings of Judah and all are well documented by other sources. Begat can also mean grandfather of and skipping unimportant generations is not uncommon in ancient genealogies. See Matthew 1:8 for a full discussion on why these four may have been left out. It may appear duplicitous to claim that there were fourteen generations, when in fact there were eighteen. Fowler argues that this verse is not in error, as it is not a description of the actual genealogy, but simply of the list that was presented in the Gospel. Fowler believes that the author of Matthew had good reason to drop the names he did and to skip unnecessary ancestors. Fowler sees instructions in this verse are to aid in the memorization of Matthew's version of the genealogy, not the historical list of descendants. By tradition the first period from Abraham to David always had fourteen names, so the author of Matthew simply cut unneeded names from the other two sections to create an easily memorized triple structure.

A transcriber skipping similar names in a list is a common error known as homoioteleuton. One theory is that the original author of Matthew probably had the list correct, and that a later scribe erased the four. This implies that this verse must be a later addition to text, as the 14/14/14 structure only came into being after that error was made.

An added problem is that, even with several extra names added, there are far too few names for the many centuries this genealogy is meant to cover, as Matthew focuses mainly on Jesus's royalty lineage, not the biological line (which is possibly used in Luke 3) which he did not have access to.

== Sources ==
- Albright, W.F. and C.S. Mann. "Matthew." The Anchor Bible Series. New York: Doubleday & Company, 1971.
- Fowler, Harold. The Gospel of Matthew: Volume One. Joplin: College Press, 1968
- Gundry, Robert H. Matthew a Commentary on his Literary and Theological Art. Grand Rapids: William B. Eerdmans Publishing Company, 1982.
- Keener, Craig S. (1999). A commentary on the Gospel of Matthew. Wm. B. Eerdmans Publishing. ISBN 978-0-8028-3821-6.

Preceded by Matthew 1:16	Gospel of Matthew; Chapter 1	Succeeded by Matthew 1:18
