= Matthew 1:4 =

- ← 1:3 1:5 →
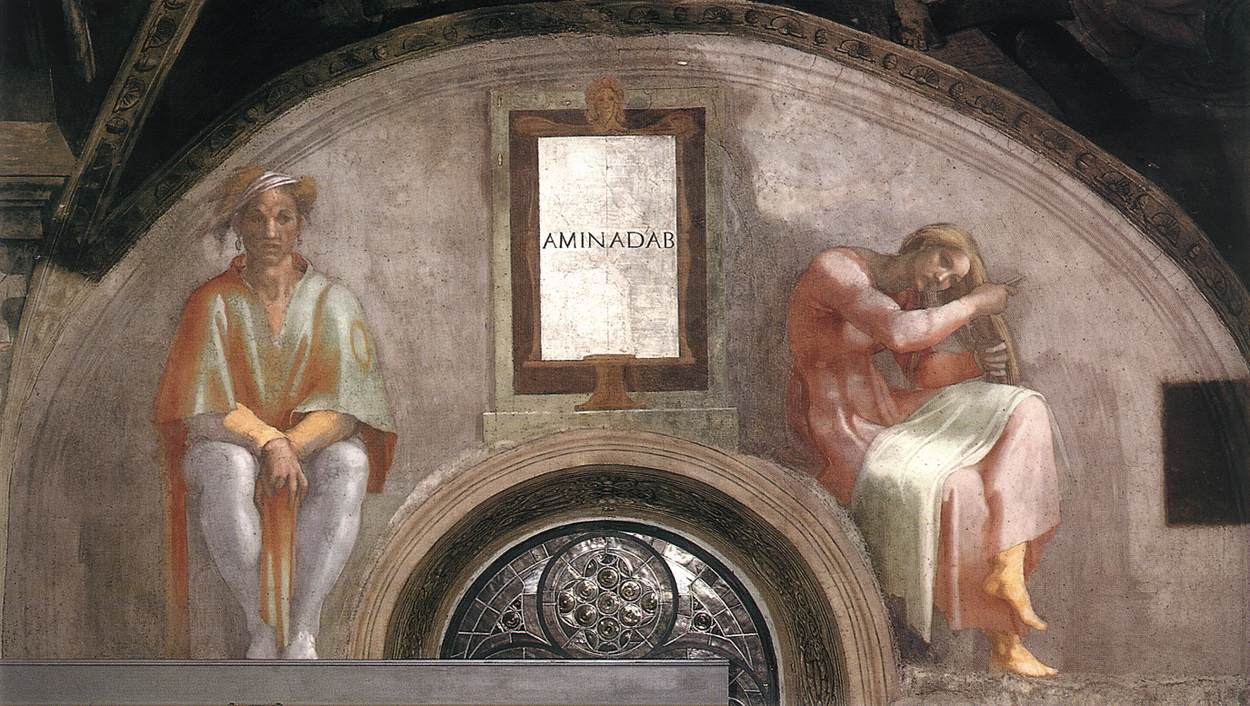
- Michelangelo's Aminadab
- Book: Gospel of Matthew
- Christian Bible part: New Testament

Matthew 1:4 is the fourth verse of the first chapter in the Gospel of Matthew in the New Testament. The verse is part of the section where the genealogy of Joseph, the legal father of Jesus, is listed.

== Content ==
In the King James Version of the Bible the text reads:

And Aram begat Aminadab;
and Aminadab begat Naasson;
and Naasson begat Salmon;

The World English Bible translates the passage as:

Ram became the father of Amminadab.
Amminadab became the father of Nahshon.
Nahshon became the father of Salmon.

For a collection of other versions see BibleHub Matthew 1:4

== Analysis ==
This genealogy matches that given in several other places in the Bible, including Luke 3:33. It covers the period when the Jews were of the captivity in Egypt up to near or after the Exodus. The passage carries the genealogy through Aram, Amminadab, Nahshon, and Salmon of which only Nahshon, the brother-in-law of Aaron, is a notable figure. According to the Old Testament it was to Nahshon that Moses gave control of the Tribe of Judah, and it is thus from him that many of the Kings of Judah are descended.

Raymond E. Brown notes that in this passage the genealogy seems to be moving much too quickly. Hezron, the father of Aram, is mentioned in Genesis 46:12 in connection with Joseph going to Egypt. Amminadab, whom Matthew states is his grandson, is mentioned in Numbers 1:7 in connection with the post-Exodus wandering in the desert. This leaves only three generations covering the period in Egypt that reportedly lasted several centuries.

== See also ==
- Genealogy of Jesus

Preceded by Matthew 1:3	Gospel of Matthew; Chapter 1	Succeeded by Matthew 1:5
