= Melchi =

Melchi may refer to:

- Melchi (biblical figure), a minor biblical character
- Melchi, a character from the Tezuka manga Jetter Mars
- Melchi, a character from the mecha anime Strain: Strategic Armored Infantry
- Melchi Zedek, an alias of Nuwabian leader Dwight York
- Villa Melchi, a villa in Borgo Forte, Montemurlo, Italy
