= Rahab =

Biblical figure

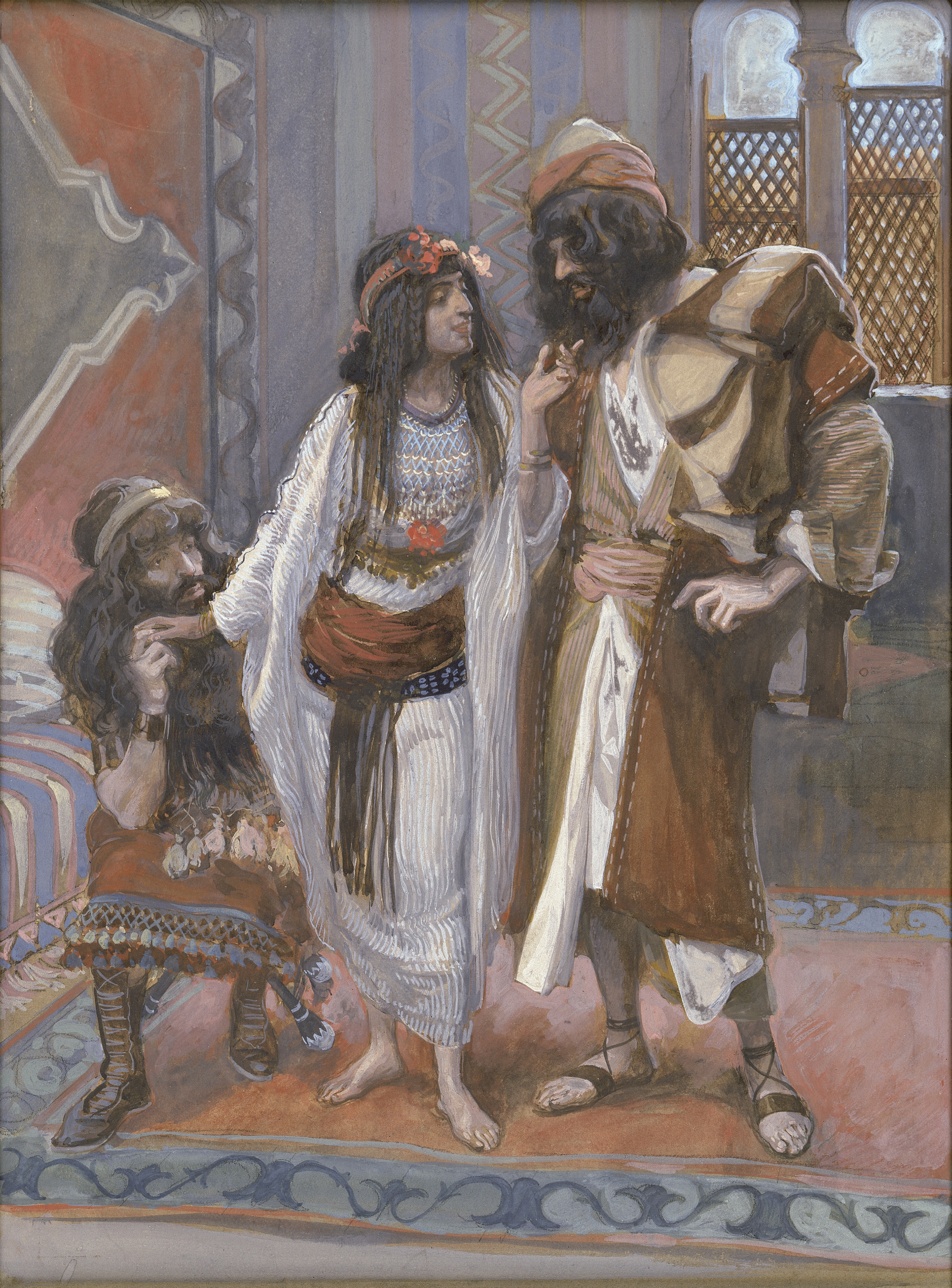
Rahab (center) in James Tissot's The Harlot of Jericho and the Two Spies

Rahab (/ˈreɪhæb/; Hebrew: רָחָב) was a prostitute from Jericho during the Israelite conquest of Canaan. In the Book of Joshua of the Hebrew Bible, she is credited with aiding the Israelites by hiding two spies who had been sent by Joshua to scout the city before the Israelite assault. Her actions led to the fall of Jericho, during which Israelite fighters killed every Canaanite inhabitant of the city.

In the New Testament, she is lauded both as an example of a saint who lived by faith, and as someone "considered righteous" for her good works. According to biblical research, the narrative's author intended that she did not contribute to the fall of Jericho, but instead saved herself and her loved ones from certain death.

The King James Version renders the name as Rachab after the spelling in Koine Greek, which differs from the spelling for Rahab in the Epistle of James and the Epistle to the Hebrews. Most modern Bible translations render it as Rahab, ignoring the distinction.

== Rahab's profession ==
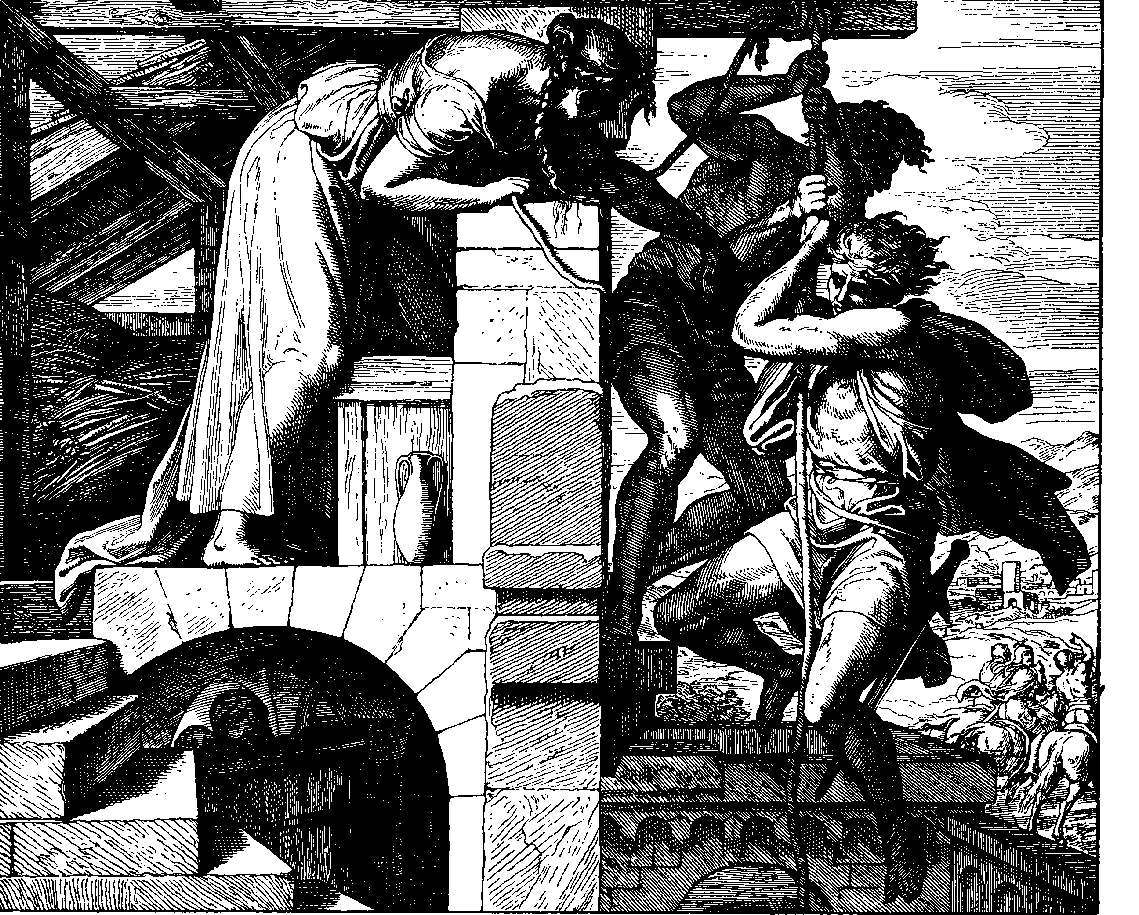
Rahab lets the spies escape in this 1860 woodcut by Julius Schnorr von Carolsfeld.

The Hebrew term אשה זונה isshā zonā, used to describe Rahab in Joshua 2:1, literally means "a prostitute woman". While the Talmud holds to that interpretation, some sources in Rabbinic literature insist she was an innkeeper, based on Targum Jonathan and other texts (Jewish Babylonian Aramaic: פֻנדְקֵיתָא, romanized: pundǝqeṯā.) Rahab's name is presumably the shortened form of a sentence-name rāḥāb-N ("the god N has opened/widened [the womb?])". The Hebrew term zonā may refer to secular or sacred prostitution; the latter was widely believed to have been an element of Canaanite religion, although recent scholarship has disputed this. However, there was a separate word, qǝḏēšā, that allegedly designated ritual prostitutes.

Josephus mentions that Rahab kept an inn but is silent as to whether merely renting out rooms was her only source of income. It was not uncommon for both an inn and a brothel to operate within the same building; thus, entering Rahab's quarters was not necessarily a deviation from Joshua's orders. Indeed, as Robert Boling notes, such an establishment might have represented an ideal location for spies to gather intelligence. Several scholars have noted that the narrator in Joshua 2 may have intended to remind the readers of the "immemorial symbiosis between military service and bawdy house".

In the New Testament, the Epistle of James and the Epistle to the Hebrews follow the tradition set by the translators of the Septuagint in using the Greek word πόρνη pórnē, which is usually translated to English as "harlot, prostitute", to describe Rahab.

William L. Lyons observed that biblical interpreters have viewed Rahab as a model of hospitality, mercy, faith, patience, and repentance in her interaction with Joshua's spies. The harlot of Jericho became a paragon of virtue.

== In the Hebrew Bible ==
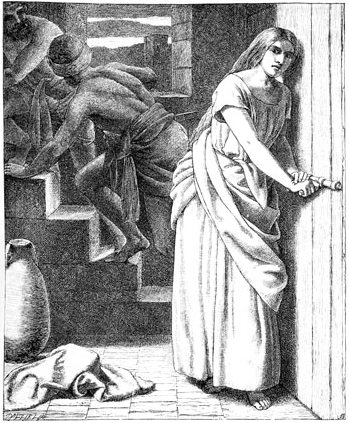
Rahab Receiveth and Concealeth the Spies by Frederick Richard Pickersgill (1881)

According to the book of Joshua, when the Hebrews were encamped at Shittim in the Arabah or Jordan Valley opposite Jericho, ready to cross the river, Joshua, as a final preparation, sent out two spies to investigate the military strength of Jericho. The spies stayed in Rahab's house, which was built into the city wall. The soldiers sent to capture the spies asked Rahab to bring out the spies. Instead, she hid them under bundles of flax on the roof. It was the time of the barley harvest, and flax and barley are ripe at the same time in the Jordan valley, so that "the bundles of flax stalks might have been expected to be drying just then".

Rahab told the spies:

She said to the men, “I know that GOD has given the country to you, because dread of you has fallen upon us, and all the inhabitants of the land are quaking before you. For we have heard how GOD dried up the waters of the Sea of Reeds for you when you left Egypt, and what you did to Sihon and Og, the two Amorite kings across the Jordan, whom you doomed. When we heard about it, we lost heart, and no one had any more spirit left because of you; for the ETERNAL your God is the only God in heaven above and on earth below. Now, since I have shown loyalty to you, swear to me by GOD that you in turn will show loyalty to my family. Provide me with a reliable sign that you will spare the lives of my father and mother, my brothers and sisters, and all who belong to them, and save us from death.”

— Joshua 2:9–13

After escaping, the spies promised to spare Rahab and her family after taking the city, even if there should be a massacre, if she would mark her house by hanging a red cord out the window. Some have claimed that the symbol of the red cord is related to the practice of the red-light district.

When the city of Jericho fell, Rahab and her whole family were preserved according to the promise of the spies and were counted among the Israelites. According to some rabbinic authorities, Rahab was treated as a beautiful captive woman in order to bring her into a marital union with Israel. (In siege warfare of antiquity, a city that fell after a prolonged siege was commonly subjected to a massacre and sack, while others were taken captive.)

Tikva Frymer-Kensky regards Rahab as "smart, proactive, tricky and unafraid to disobey and deceive her king". She also credits Rahab with being "one of Israel’s early saviors" due to "her allegiance to God and Israel". As the first non-Israelite person, and in particular the first Canaanite woman, to ally with Israel, Rahab's convictions led her to protect the men sent by Joshua despite her background.

Michael Coogan says the book of Joshua, more than any other book of the Bible, contains short etiological narratives that explain the origins of religious rituals, topographical features, genealogical relationships, and other aspects of ancient Israelite life, and that the legend of Rahab is such an example. The story of Rahab, as faithful, was counted as an Israelite, and not part of the Deuteronomistic injunction to kill all Canaanites and not to intermarry with them.

Some scholars see the parallels between Joshua 2 and Genesis 19, which narrates the fall of Sodom and Gomorrah. Like Sodom and Gomorrah, Jericho was presumed to be equally as wicked, with Rahab challenging Jericho's "oppressive establishment" by siding with Jericho's destroyers (i.e. the Israelites). Coincidentally, these cities were believed to lie among a major fault line extending 1,100 kilometers from the Red Sea to Turkey.

== In rabbinic literature ==
In the midrash, Rahab is named as one of the four most beautiful women the world has ever known, along with Sarah, Abigail, and Esther. In the Babylonian Talmud, Rahab was so beautiful that the very mention of her name could cause arousal (Megillah 15a). Rahab is said to have converted at the age of 50, after practising prostitution for 40 years, and repented according to three sins, saying:

Master of the Universe! I have sinned with three things [with my eye, my thigh, and my stomach]. By the merit of three things pardon me: the rope, the window, and the wall [pardon me for engaging in harlotry because I endangered myself when I lowered the rope for the spies from the window in the wall]." (Babylonian Talmud, Zevahim 116a–b).

A similar tradition has Rahab declaring, "Pardon me by merit of the rope, the window, and the flaxen [the stalks of flax under which she concealed the spies]."

Because of this, rabbis interpret Biblical verses that talk about the citizens of Jericho "melting in fear", such as Joshua 2:9–11 and Joshua 5:1, as describing their inability to maintain erections upon hearing Israelite military victories. Rahab knew this because "there was no minister or prince that did not pay a visit to Rahab the harlot".

The rabbis viewed Rahab as a worthy convert, and attested that following her conversion, Rahab married Joshua, and their descendants included the prophets Jeremiah, Hilkiah, Seraiah, Mahseiah, Baruch, Ezekiel and the prophetess Hulda, although there is no report in the book of Joshua of the leader marrying anyone, or having any family life. Rahab often is mentioned alongside Jethro (Yitro) and Na'aman as "positive examples" of the converts who joined Israel, and another midrash has Rahab acting as an advocate for all nations of the world.

Some believe that the genealogies described in Jeremiah 1:1 and Ezekiel 1:3 served to dispel accusations that Jeremiah and Ezekiel were descendants of Rahab. At the time, the Israelites discriminated against these prophets for this alleged heritage.

== In the New Testament ==
In the New Testament, Rahab (Greek Ῥαάβ) of the Book of Joshua is mentioned as an example of a person of faith and of good works. Rahab is referred to as "the harlot" in each of these passages.

A different spelling of the name, Rachab (as transliterated in the King James translation of the Greek Ῥαχάβ) is mentioned in the Gospel of Matthew as one of the ancestors of Jesus (Matthew 1:5). She married Salmon of the Tribe of Judah and was the mother of Boaz. Most other English Bibles transcribe her name as Rahab.

Some have conjectured that Jesus invoked the name of "Rahab" (רחב) by writing it in the sand when he protected the adulteress from stoning (John 8:6). Through this act he would have reminded the hypocritical Pharisees of the righteous prostitute in their own ancestry.

== In fiction ==
- Rahab is depicted as a virtuous soul (in The Third Circle of Heaven) in Dante's Divine Comedy (Paradiso 9.112 ff.)
- Rahab is a figure in the mythos of William Blake. She is pictured as a harlot, akin to the whore of Babylon, and figures alongside Blake's character of Tirzah, as representing materialism, false religion, and fallen sexuality. Rahab's embrace of Urizen, who loosely represents fallen reason, is seen as the consolidation of error necessary to bring about the Final Judgment.
- The claim of Hugh Broughton, a controversial historian, that Rahab was already "a harlot at ten years of age" is used by Humbert Humbert to explain or perhaps justify his attraction to young girls in Nabokov's Lolita.

Fictional accounts of Rahab's life

- Afshar, Tessa. Pearl in the Sand (2010), ISBN 978-0-8024-5881-0
- Burton, Anne. Rahab's Story (2005), ISBN 0-451-21628-8; Book 2 in Burton's "Women of the Bible" series.
- Havel, Carlene and Faucheux, Sharon. The Scarlet Cord (2014), ISBN 1940099692
- MacFarlane, Hannah. The Scarlet Cord (2009), ISBN 1844273709
- Morris, Gilbert. Daughter of Deliverance. ISBN 0-7642-2921-4; Book 6 of "Lions of Judah" Series.
- Rivers, Francine. Unashamed: Rahab (2000), ISBN 978-0842335966; Book 2 in Rivers' "A Lineage of Grace" series.
- Slaughter, Frank G. The Scarlet Cord: A Novel of the Woman of Jericho (1956), ISBN 0671774980
- Smith, Jill Eileen. The Crimson Cord: Rahab's Story (2015). ISBN 978 0 8007 2034 6; Book 1 in Smith's "Daughters of the Promised Land" series.
- Wolf, Joan. This Scarlet Cord: The Love Story of Rahab (2012), ISBN 1595548777
- Jennings, Jenifer. "Crimson Cord" (2017), ISBN 1954105061
- Craig, Naomi. "Rahab's Courage" (2021),

Television portrayals

- Rahab is portrayed by Myrna Fahey in the 1967 TV series The Time Tunnel in episode 20 entitled "The Walls of Jericho".
- Rahab is portrayed by Stephanie Leonidas in the 2013 TV miniseries The Bible.

== See also ==
- Hooker with a heart of gold
- Rahab (term)
- Genetic studies of Jews
