= Robert H. Gundry =

American Bible scholar (born 1932)

- Born: October 15, 1932 (age 94)
- Occupation: Biblical scholar

Academic background
- Education: Manchester University
- Thesis: The Use of the Old Testament in St. Matthew’s Gospel with Special Reference to the Messianic Hope (1961)

Academic work
- Main interests: New Testament Greek with the Gospels and Pauline epistles

Robert Horton Gundry (born 1932) is an American scholar and retired professor of New Testament studies and Koine Greek.

== Life ==
Gundry was born in 1932 to Norman C. and Lolita (née Hinshaw) Gundry. He is the older brother of Stanley N. Gundry.

Gundry received B.A. and B.D. degrees from the Los Angeles Baptist College and Seminary in the 1950s, and in 1961 a Ph.D. from Manchester University, England, where he worked under F. F. Bruce. For 38 years, beginning in 1962, he taught at Westmont College in Santa Barbara, California. In 1997 the college installed Gundry in its first endowed faculty chair and soon afterwards established also the Robert H. Gundry Chair of Biblical Studies. Upon his retirement in 2000 the college made him professor emeritus and scholar-in-residence. He has been a frequent contributor to periodicals such as Books and Culture and Education and Culture.

Students of Gundry who have made notable scholarly contributions in biblical studies and theology include: Gregory L. Bahnsen, Diana Butler Bass, Philip Clayton, Kathleen E. Corley, Stephen C. Daley, Gary W. Deddo, C. Rosalee Velloso Ewell, Judith M. Gundry, Dennis E. Johnson, Roy D. Kotansky, Brian Lugioyo, Jennifer Powell McNutt, J. Webb Mealy, William B. Nelson, Roger J. Newell, Benjamin E. Reynolds, Mark L. Strauss, James E. Taylor, and Kevin J. Vanhoozer.

== Writings and controversies ==
Besides many articles and reviews that have appeared in scholarly journals, Gundry has published major scholarly commentaries on the Gospel of Mark and the Gospel of Matthew. The one on Matthew caused a controversy that led to his resignation from the Evangelical Theological Society (ETS) at that society's request in 1983. Voters favoring the request reckoned that the commentary was at odds with the society's affirmation of scriptural inerrancy. Using redaction criticism, Gundry argued that Matthew tailored the story of Jesus, sometimes unhistorically, to meet the needs of the Gospel's intended audience. Especially troubling to many in the ETS was Gundry's contention that Matthew made unhistorical, theologically motivated revisions of the infancy story in Matthew.

Earlier, Gundry had been asked to furnish a commentary on Matthew in the Expositor’s Bible Commentary (EBC), a major evangelical series of commentaries published over the course of a decade or more in the 1970s and 1980s, as each section was completed. When he submitted his proposed commentary to Frank Gaebelein, general editor of the series, Gaebelein pronounced the commentary acceptable; but the subeditors Merrill C. Tenney and James M. Boice objected to its use of redaction criticism. Gaebelein pronounced acceptable Gundry's successive revised versions as well; but Tenney and Boice objected again, to both of them, so that D. A. Carson of Trinity Evangelical Divinity School was assigned to write on Matthew. This assignment caused a delay of several years in the publication of the EBC's volume on the Synoptic Gospels. Meanwhile, Eerdmans Publishing Company brought out a longer, more technical version of Gundry's work.

According to Gundry, his work does not call into question the inerrancy of the Gospel of Matthew. He argues, to the contrary, that inerrancy must be considered in the twin lights of authorial intent and acceptable literary standards of the author's time and place, and that Matthew intentionally and acceptably "treats us to history mixed with elements that cannot be called historical in a modern sense." To be called inerrant, then, Matthew's Gospel need not be measured against standards of modern historical writing. By contrast, says Gundry, "Luke states a historical purpose along lines that run closer to modern history writing ..." These views were supported by a significant portion of the ETS; and after looking into the matter, the society's executive committee cleared Gundry. But a campaign against him, spearheaded by Norman Geisler, resulted in the request that he resign. Against his critics, Gundry has contended that he treats biblical wording more seriously than they do when they construct strained harmonizations to maintain historicity at every point. Outside certain quarters of the ETS, his work is generally considered a model of conservative evangelicalism.

Gundry's other published books include The Use of the Old Testament in St. Matthew’s Gospel (based on his doctoral dissertation), Sōma in Biblical Theology (arguing for a physical meaning of “body,” even in figurative usage), and The Old Is Better (containing new and revised essays on various topics). His two books The Church and the Tribulation and First the Antichrist undermine the popular view that Christians will be “raptured” out of the world prior to a coming tribulation (see Second Coming).

Yet another book, Jesus the Word according to John the Sectarian, argues that American evangelicalism needs to return, mutatis mutandis, to the enlightened fundamentalism of the early 20th century, as distinct from the obscurantist fundamentalism of the mid-20th century. In 2000 Gundry presented the essence of Jesus the Word at the 30th annual lecture of the Institute for Biblical Research.

Extracurriculars: Teaching Christianly Outside Class contains talks delivered on various occasions at Westmont College, and the title Peter: False Disciple and Apostate according to Saint Matthew is self-explanatory. Gundry's latest book, Re-Views by an Evangelical Biblical Critic, gathers lightly edited, previously published review essays of books and films dealing in biblical text and translation, higher critical issues, literary portraits of Jesus, the relation between the Bible and tradition, and biographical portrayals of people associated with Scripture and its interpretation.

Gundry's textbook, A Survey of the New Testament, has been translated from English into Portuguese, Serbo-Croatian, Korean, Russian, and Turkish and produced as an eighteen-lesson DVD course in English. His Commentary on the New Testament includes his own, literal translation of the entire New Testament and verse-by-verse explanations of its original meaning and contains many independent judgments not found elsewhere in either scholarly or popular literature.

== Works ==
=== Thesis ===
- Gundry, Robert H. (1961). The Use of the Old Testament in St. Matthew's Gospel with Special Reference to the Messianic Hope (Ph.D.). Manchester, UK: Manchester University.

=== Books ===
- ——— (1967). The Use of the Old Testament in St. Matthew's Gospel with Special Reference to the Messianic Hope. Supplements to Novum Testamentum. Vol. 18. Leiden: E. J. Brill. OCLC 383260. – based on his Ph.D. thesis
- ——— (1970). A Survey of the New Testament. Grand Rapids, MI: Zondervan. ISBN 9780310254102. OCLC 182763270.
- ——— (1973). The Church and the Tribulation. Grand Rapids, MI: Zondervan. ISBN 9780310254010. OCLC 914549.
- ——— (1976). Sōma in Biblical Theology with Emphasis on Pauline Anthropology. Society for New Testament Studies - Monograph series. Vol. 29. Cambridge: Cambridge University Press. ISBN 9780521207881. OCLC 1602112.
- ——— (1982). Matthew: A Commentary on His Literary and Theological Art (1st ed.). Grand Rapids, MI: Eerdmans. ISBN 9780802807359. OCLC 832315471.
- ——— (1993). Mark: A Commentary on His Apology for the Cross (1st ed.). Grand Rapids, MI: Eerdmans. ISBN 9780802836984. OCLC 949162743.
- ——— (1994). Matthew: A Commentary on His Handbook for a Mixed Church under Persecution (2nd ed.). Grand Rapids, MI: Eerdmans. ISBN 9780802835499. OCLC 7733821. - revised and retitled edition of the 1982 title
- ——— (1997). First the Antichrist: a book for lay Christians approaching the third millennium and inquiring whether Jesus will come to take the church out of the world before the tribulation. Grand Rapids, MI: Baker. ISBN 9780801057649. OCLC 36510821.
- ——— (2001). Jesus the Word according to John the Sectarian: A Paleofundamentalist Manifesto for Evangelicalism, Especially Its Elites, in North America. Grand Rapids, MI: Eerdmans. ISBN 9780802849809. OCLC 47767071.
- ——— (2005). A Response to Some Criticisms of Matthew: a commentary on his literary and theological art. Evangelical Theological Society papers. Vol. ETS-1054. Portland, OR: Theological Research Exchange Network. OCLC 60406098.
- ——— (2005). The Old Is Better: New Testament Essays in Support of Traditional Interpretations. Wissenschaftliche Untersuchungen zum Neuen Testament. Vol. 178. Tübingen: Mohr Siebeck. ISBN 9783161485510. OCLC 60333446.
- ——— (2010). Commentary on the New Testament: verse-by-verse explanations with a literal translation. Peabody, MA: Hendrickson. ISBN 9781565639331. OCLC 460935404.
- ——— (2014). Extracurriculars: Teaching Christianity Outside Class. Eugene, OR: Wipf & Stock. ISBN 9781625645777. OCLC 870290672.
- ——— (2015). Peter: False Disciple and Apostate according to Saint Matthew. Grand Rapids, MI: Eerdmans. ISBN 9780802872937. OCLC 907131892.
- ——— (2018). Peter: False Disciple and Apostate according to Saint Matthew, second edition, with Responses to Reviews. Eugene, OR: Wipf & Stock. ISBN 9781532663482.
- ——— (2022). Re-Views by an Evangelical Biblical Critic. Eugene, OR: Wipf and Stock. ISBN 9781666741506.

== Festschriften ==
In 1994 Gundry was presented with a Festschrift, To Tell the Mystery: Essays on New Testament Eschatology in Honor of Robert H. Gundry (ed. Thomas E. Schmidt and Moisés Silva; Sheffield: JSOT, 1994). ISBN 1-85075-486-1 In 2014 a second Festschrift was presented to him: Reconsidering the Relationship between Biblical and Systematic Theology in the New Testament (ed. Benjamin E. Reynolds, Brian Lugioyo, and Kevin J. Vanhoozer; WUNT 2/369; Tübingen: Mohr Siebeck, 2014). ISBN 978-3-16-152719-7
