= Elisheba =

Biblical figure

- אֱלִישֶׁבַע
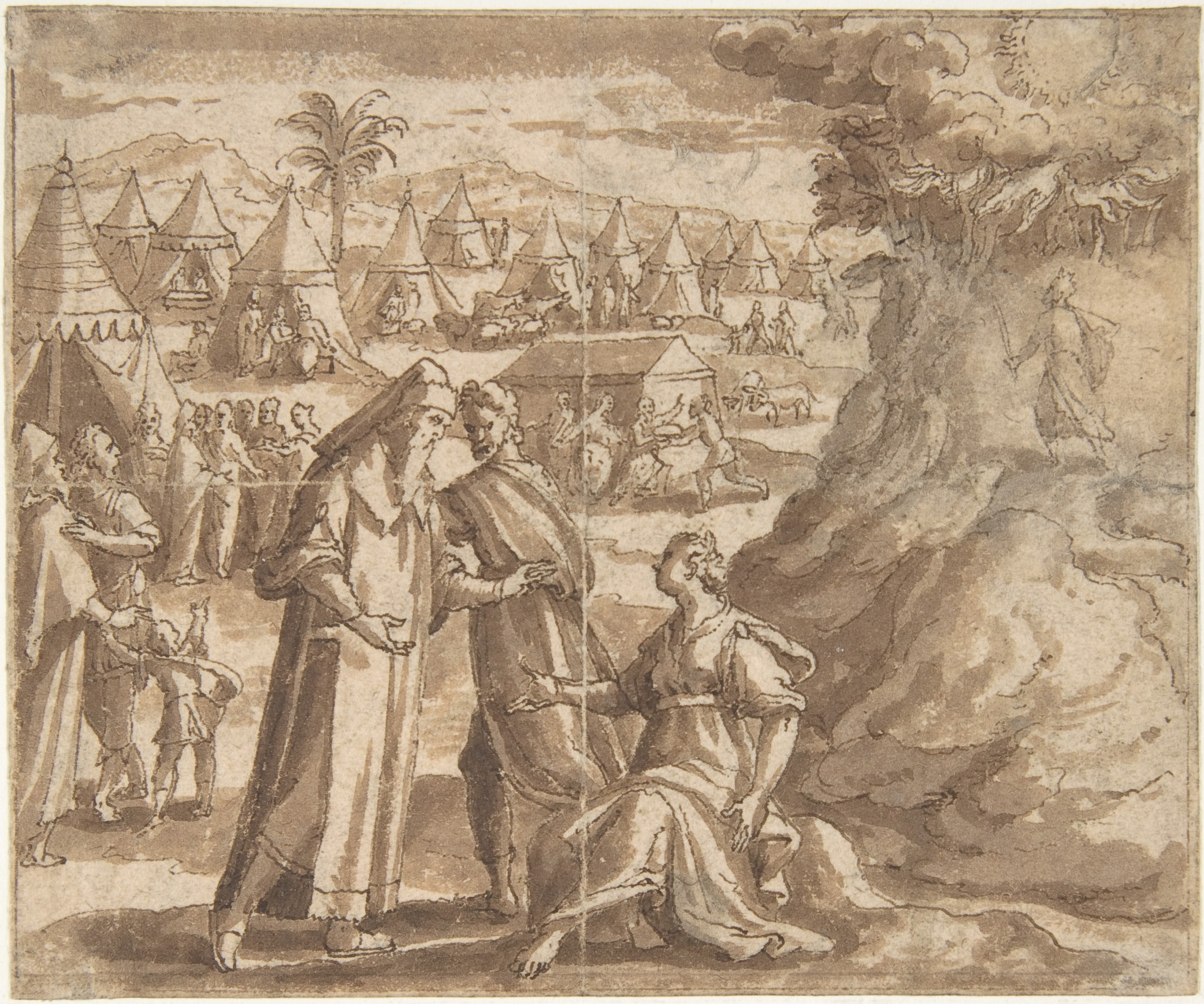
- Aaron and Nadab take leave of Elisheba (pictured from left to right), camped before Mount Sinai, while Moses ascends.
- Born: (possibly) Goshen, Lower Egypt, Ancient Egypt
- Died: Unknown
- Resting place: Tiberias, Israel
- Other name: Elisheva (original form)
- Known for: Being the wife of Aaron, and the matriarch of the first Kohanim of Israel; she is also remembered as one of the prominent women among women in the Bible.
- Spouse: Aaron
- Children: Nadab; Abihu; Eleazar; Ithamar
- Father: Amminadab
- Relatives: Nahshon (brother)

Elisheba (/əˈlɪʃɪbə/; (original) Hebrew: אֱלִישֶׁבַע, romanized: ’Ělīševa‘) was the wife of Aaron, the older brother of Moses and the first High Priest of Israel. She was mentioned once in Exodus 6:23 in the Torah and the Old Testament.

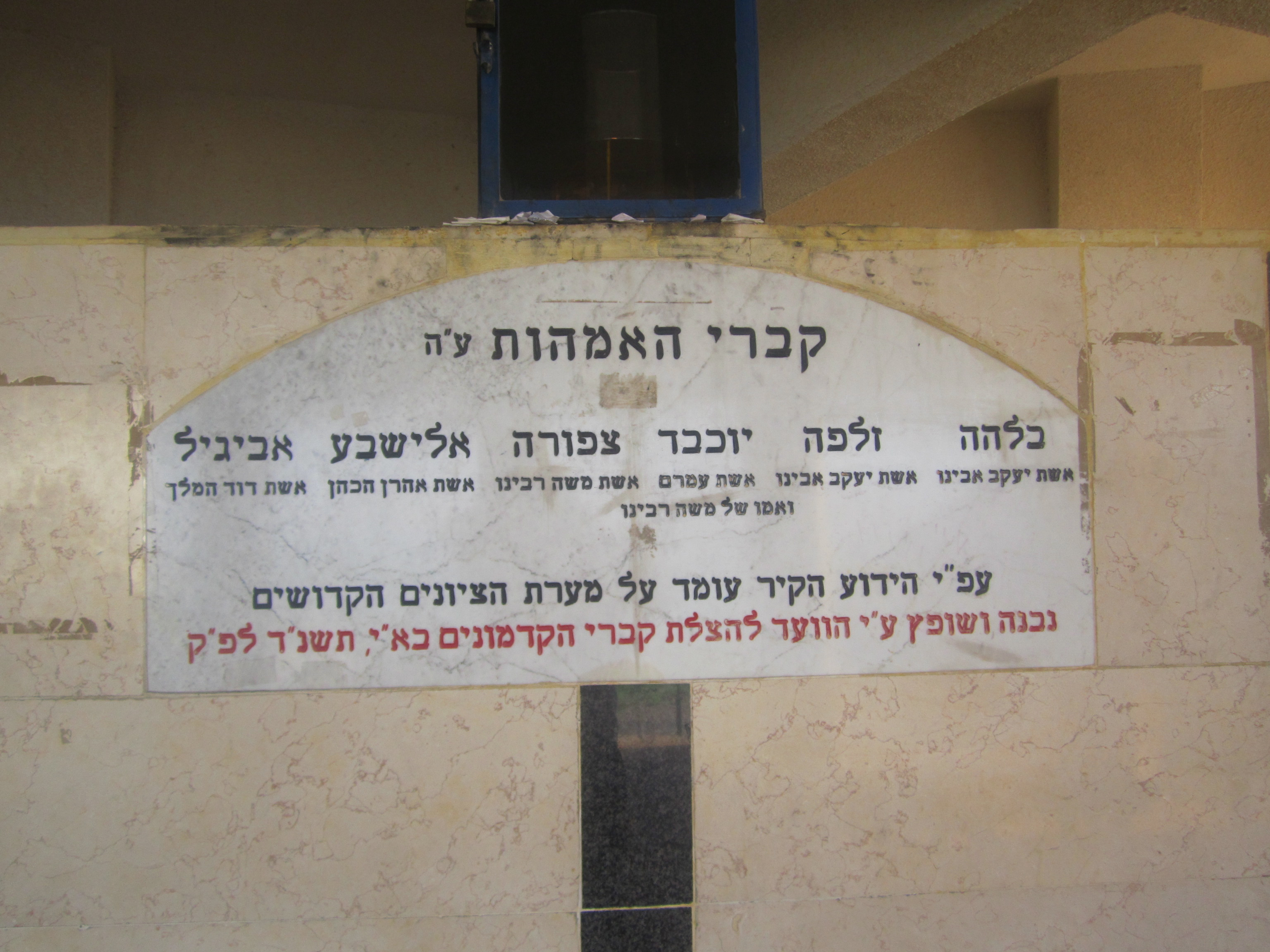
Tomb of the Matriarchs in Tiberias, Israel. According to tradition, Elisheba rests here.

== In the Torah ==
In the book of Exodus, she was said to be a daughter of Amminadab from the Tribe of Judah and a sister of Nahshon. The Hebrew name Elisheva is composed of two parts: "Eli", from Elohim (Hebrew: אֱלֹהִים), one of the Hebrew words for God, and "sheva", which roughly translates to "oath". Thus, the name Elisheva translated into English means "God is my oath" or "my God is an oath".

The Torah mentions that Elisheba and Aaron had four sons: Nadab, Abihu, Eleazar, and Ithamar. As per halakha, in order for a Jewish person to be legitimately recognized as one of the Kohanim (Hebrew: כֹּהֲנִים) and a member of the priestly lineage/bloodline, they must be a Levite of direct patrilineal descent from Eleazar and Ithamar, the two youngest sons of Aaron and Elisheba (i.e. be descendants of Aaron on both sides of the family).

== In the Christian Bible ==
In the first chapter of the Gospel of Luke in the New Testament, a woman named Elisabet (Greek: Ἐλισάβετ) is said to have been a descendant of Aaron and the wife of Zechariah, who was also a Jewish priest. Elisabet was a relative of Jesus' mother, Mary, and was the mother of John the Baptist with Zechariah.

== Derivations ==
=== In English ===
Elizabeth is the common English-language variant of Elisabet, which is derived from Elisheva.

=== In Spanish/Portuguese ===
Isabel is the Spanish and Portuguese version of the name Elisheva or Elizabeth in English.

=== In Italian ===
Elisabetta is the Italian version of Elizabeth, while Isabella is the Italian version of Elisheva.

=== In the Muslim world ===
Alishba is a modern name that is believed to have been derived from an Arabic-language translation of Elisheva. It is prevalent among Muslims in the Indian subcontinent.
