= Rujeib =

- Municipality type D (Village council)

Arabic transcription(s)
  - Arabic: روجيب
  - Latin: Rujib (unofficial)
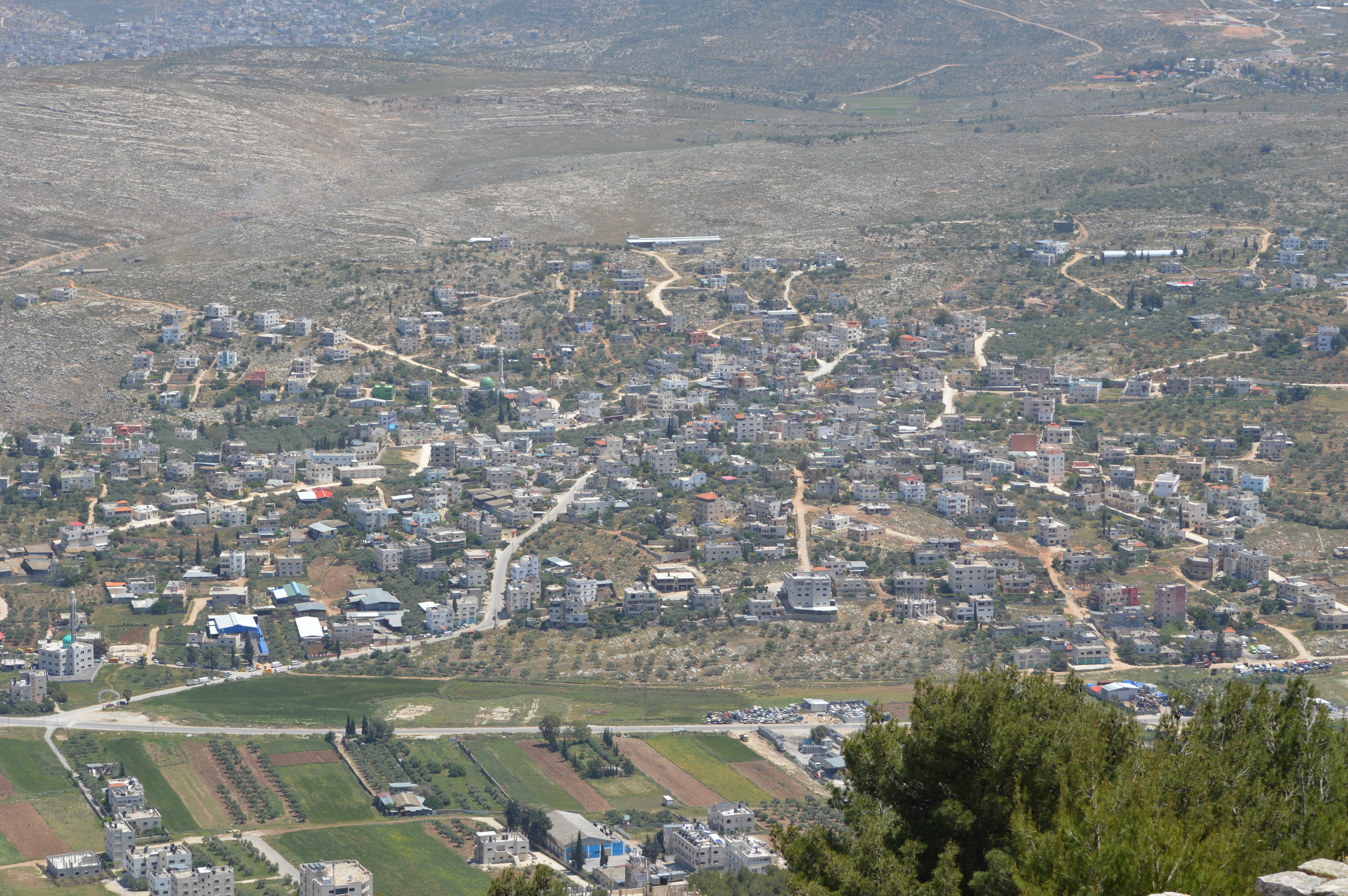

- Location of Rujeib within Palestine
- Coordinates: 32°11′27″N 35°17′34″E
- Palestine grid: 177/177
- State: State of Palestine
- Governorate: Nablus

Government
  - Type: Village council

Population (2017)
  - Total: 5,964
- Name meaning: either from personal name, or for a prop for a tree,

Rujeib (Arabic: روجيب) is a Palestinian town in the Nablus Governorate of the State of Palestine, in the northern West Bank, located 3 kilometers southeast of Nablus. According to the Palestinian Central Bureau of Statistics (PCBS), the town had a population of 5,964 inhabitants in 2017.

== Location ==
Rujeib is located 4.3 km south east of Nablus. It is bordered by Beit Furik to the east, ‘Awarta to the south, and Nablus to the north and west.

== History ==
There was a human habitation here during the Chalcolithic era.

Sherds from the Late Bronze Age/Iron Age I, Hellenistic, Roman and Byzantine eras have been found here.

It has been suggested that Rujeib was the Crusader village Ragabam, which was one of the villages exchanged with Bethany by King Baldwin I and given as a fief to the Church of the Holy Sepulchre. Pottery from the Crusader era have also been found here.

=== Ottoman era ===
In 1517, the village was included in the Ottoman Empire with the rest of Palestine, and in the 1596 tax-records it appeared as Rujib, located in the Nahiya of Jabal Qubal in the Nablus Sanjak. The population was 16 households and 1 bachelors, all Muslim. They paid a fixed tax rate of 33.3% on agricultural products, such as wheat, barley, summer crops, olive trees, goats and beehives, a press for olive oil or grape syrup, in addition to occasional revenues and a fixed tax for people of Nablus area; a total of 3,600 Akçe.

In 1838, Raujib was noted in the El-Beitawy district, east of Nablus, together with Beita, Haudela and Awarta. In 1850/51 de Saulcy noted Roujib on a lower hill than Beit Dejan.

In 1870, Victor Guérin noted that Rujeib was a "village of three hundred inhabitants more, on a hill whose flanks were formerly, in several places, exploited as a quarry. Cactus hedges serve as enclosures for some gardens."

In 1882, the Palestine Exploration Fund's Survey of Western Palestinedescribed Rujib as "A village of moderate size to the east of the plain so named, with a few olives round it."

=== British Mandate era ===
In the 1922 census of Palestine conducted by the British Mandate authorities, Rujib had a population of 250 Muslims, increasing in the 1931 census to 277 Muslims, in 58 houses.

In the 1945 statistics, Rujeib had a population of 390 Muslims while the total land area was 7,038 dunams, according to an official land and population survey. Of this, 235 dunams were used for plantations and irrigable land, 3,410 for cereals, while 30 dunams were classified as built-up (urban) areas.

=== Jordanian era ===
In the wake of the 1948 Arab–Israeli War, and after the 1949 Armistice Agreements, Rujeib came under Jordanian rule.

In 1961, the population of Rujeib was 628 persons.

=== Post 1967 ===
Since the Six-Day War in 1967, Rujeib has been under Israeli occupation. The population in the 1967 census conducted by Israel was 831, of whom 30 originated from the Israeli territory.

After the 1995 accord 28% of Rujeib’s lands were classified as Area B, the remaining 72% as Area C. Israel has confiscated 169 dunams of land from Rujeib for construction of the Israeli settlement of Itamar.

== Demography ==
=== Origins ===
Residents of Rujeib have their origins and family connections in the village of Beita.

== Bibliography ==
- Barron, J.B., ed. (1923). Palestine: Report and General Abstracts of the Census of 1922. Government of Palestine.
- Bull, Robert J.; Edward F. Campbell (1968). "The Sixth Campaign at Balâṭah (Shechem)". Bulletin of the American Schools of Oriental Research. 190 (190): 2–41. doi:10.2307/1356191. JSTOR 1356191. S2CID 222441522.
- Conder, C.R.; Kitchener, H.H. (1882). The Survey of Western Palestine: Memoirs of the Topography, Orography, Hydrography, and Archaeology. Vol. 2. London: Committee of the Palestine Exploration Fund.
- Conder, C.R.; Kitchener, H.H. (1883). The Survey of Western Palestine: Memoirs of the Topography, Orography, Hydrography, and Archaeology. Vol. 3. London: Committee of the Palestine Exploration Fund.
- Conder, C.R. (1890). "Norman Palestine". Quarterly Statement - Palestine Exploration Fund. 22: 29–37.
- Finkelstein, I.; Lederman, Zvi, eds. (1997). Highlands of many cultures. Tel Aviv: Institute of Archaeology of Tel Aviv University Publications Section. ISBN 965-440-007-3.
- Government of Jordan, Department of Statistics (1964). First Census of Population and Housing. Volume I: Final Tables; General Characteristics of the Population (PDF).
- Government of Palestine, Department of Statistics (1945). Village Statistics, April, 1945.
- Guérin, V. (1874). Description Géographique Historique et Archéologique de la Palestine (in French). Vol. 2: Samarie, pt. 1. Paris: L'Imprimerie Nationale.
- Hadawi, S. (1970). Village Statistics of 1945: A Classification of Land and Area ownership in Palestine. Palestine Liberation Organization Research Center.
- Hütteroth, W.-D.; Abdulfattah, K. (1977). Historical Geography of Palestine, Transjordan and Southern Syria in the Late 16th Century. Erlanger Geographische Arbeiten, Sonderband 5. Erlangen, Germany: Vorstand der Fränkischen Geographischen Gesellschaft. ISBN 3-920405-41-2.
- Jaroš, K.; Deckert, B. (1977). Studien zur Sichem Ära (PDF). University of Zurich. pp. 1–83. ISBN 3-7278-0180-8.
- Mills, E., ed. (1932). Census of Palestine 1931. Population of Villages, Towns and Administrative Areas. Jerusalem: Government of Palestine.
- Palmer, E.H. (1881). The Survey of Western Palestine: Arabic and English Name Lists Collected During the Survey by Lieutenants Conder and Kitchener, R. E. Transliterated and Explained by E.H. Palmer. Committee of the Palestine Exploration Fund.
- Robinson, E.; Smith, E. (1841). Biblical Researches in Palestine, Mount Sinai and Arabia Petraea: A Journal of Travels in the year 1838. Vol. 3. Boston: Crocker & Brewster.
- Saulcy, L.F. de (1854). Narrative of a journey round the Dead Sea, and in the Bible lands, in 1850 and 1851. Vol. 1, new edition. London: R. Bentley.
