= Beita, Nablus =

Municipality type B in Nablus, Palestine

Beita
- Municipality type B

Arabic transcription(s)
  - Arabic: بيتا
  - Latin: Bayta (official)
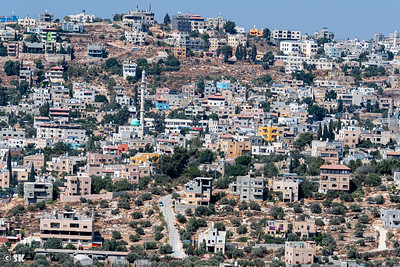
- Beita

- Location of Beita within Palestine
- Coordinates: 32°08′37″N 35°17′15″E
- Palestine grid: 177/172
- State: Palestine
- Governorate: Nablus

Government
  - Type: Municipality (from 1996)
  - Head of Municipality: Arab ash-Shurafa

Area
  - Total: 76.0 km^{2} (29.3 sq mi)

Population (2017)
  - Total: 11,682
  - Density: 154/km^{2} (398/sq mi)
- Name meaning: Beit, "a house"

Beita (Arabic: بيتا, translation: "Home") is a Palestinian town in the Nablus Governorate in the northern Israeli-occupied West Bank located 13 kilometers (8.1 mi) southeast of Nablus. According to the Palestinian Central Bureau of Statistics, the town had a population of 11,682 in 2017. It consists of five clans which branch out to thirty families. There are many houses dating back to the Roman era. The current mayor, elected in 2004 is Arab ash-Shurafa.

The town contains four mosques and three clinics. Since 1967, under the Israeli occupation of the West Bank, more than 77 Beita villagers have been shot dead by Israeli forces, many during protests, 7 were killed between May and September 2021 during the suppression of demonstrations against the establishment of an Israeli outpost on Beita lands.

== Location ==
Beita (including Za'tara locality) is located 9 kilometers (5.6 mi)–11 kilometers (6.8 mi) south of Nablus. It is bordered by Osarin and Aqraba to the east, Awarta and Odala to the north, Huwwara and Yasuf to the west, and Yatma and Qabalan to the south.

== History ==
There are two historical centres in Beita; Beita el-Fauqa ("The upper Beita") to the North-East and Beita et-Tahta ("The lower Beita") to the South-West. In Beita el-Fauqa, pottery sherds from the Iron Age II/Persian. Persian and Mamluk era have been found, while at Beita et-Tahta sherds from the Iron Age II, Persian, Roman/Byzantine, Byzantine, and Mamluk era have been found.

=== Ottoman era ===
Beita was incorporated into the Ottoman Empire in 1517 with all of Palestine, and both in Beita el-Fauqa and Beita et-Tatha sherds from the early Ottoman era have been found. In 1596 Beita appeared in the tax registers as being in the Nahiya of Jabal Qubal of the Liwa of Nablus. It had a population of 50 households, all Muslim. The villagers paid taxes on wheat, barley, summer crops, olive trees, occasional revenues, goats and/or beehives, and a press for olives or grapes; a total of 8,000 Akçe.

In 1838, Edward Robinson noted Beita as a "large village", located in the El-Beitawy district, east of Nablus.

In 1882, the PEF's Survey of Western Palestine described it as "A large village, with a kind of suburb to the south, near which are ancient tombs. It is supplied by wells, and surrounded by olives. It stands upon the hills east of the Mukhnah plain, and is the capital of the district named from it."

=== British Mandate era ===
In the 1922 census of Palestine conducted by the British Mandate authorities, Beita had a population of 883, all Muslims, increasing at the time of the 1931 census to 1,194, still all Muslim, in 286 houses.

In the 1945 statistics Beita had a population of 1,580 Muslims, with 17,542 dunams of land, according to an official land and population survey. Of this, 5,666 dunams were plantations and irrigable land, 6,916 used for cereals, while 76 dunams were built-up land.

=== Jordanian era ===
In the wake of the 1948 Arab–Israeli War, and after the 1949 Armistice Agreements, Beita came under annexed Jordanian rule.

At the beginning of 1930s Shaikh Rezeq Abdelrazeq Elyan Open the first school in Beita Al-Tahta and it was names (Beita National School) and the student from beita and around used to come and get education in it. In 1952, Beita opened an elementary school, which served the town and surrounding villages. In 1954, an elementary school for girls only was established and since then, four other schools have been built - including two secondary schools.

The Jordanian census of 1961 found 693 inhabitants in Beita Tahta ("the lower Beita"), while Beita Fauqa ("the higher Beita") had 1,498 inhabitants; a total of 2,191 inhabitants.

=== Post-1967 ===
Since the Six-Day War in 1967, Beita has been under Israeli occupation.

After the 1995 accords, 89% of the village land was classified as Area B, and the remaining 11% as Area C.

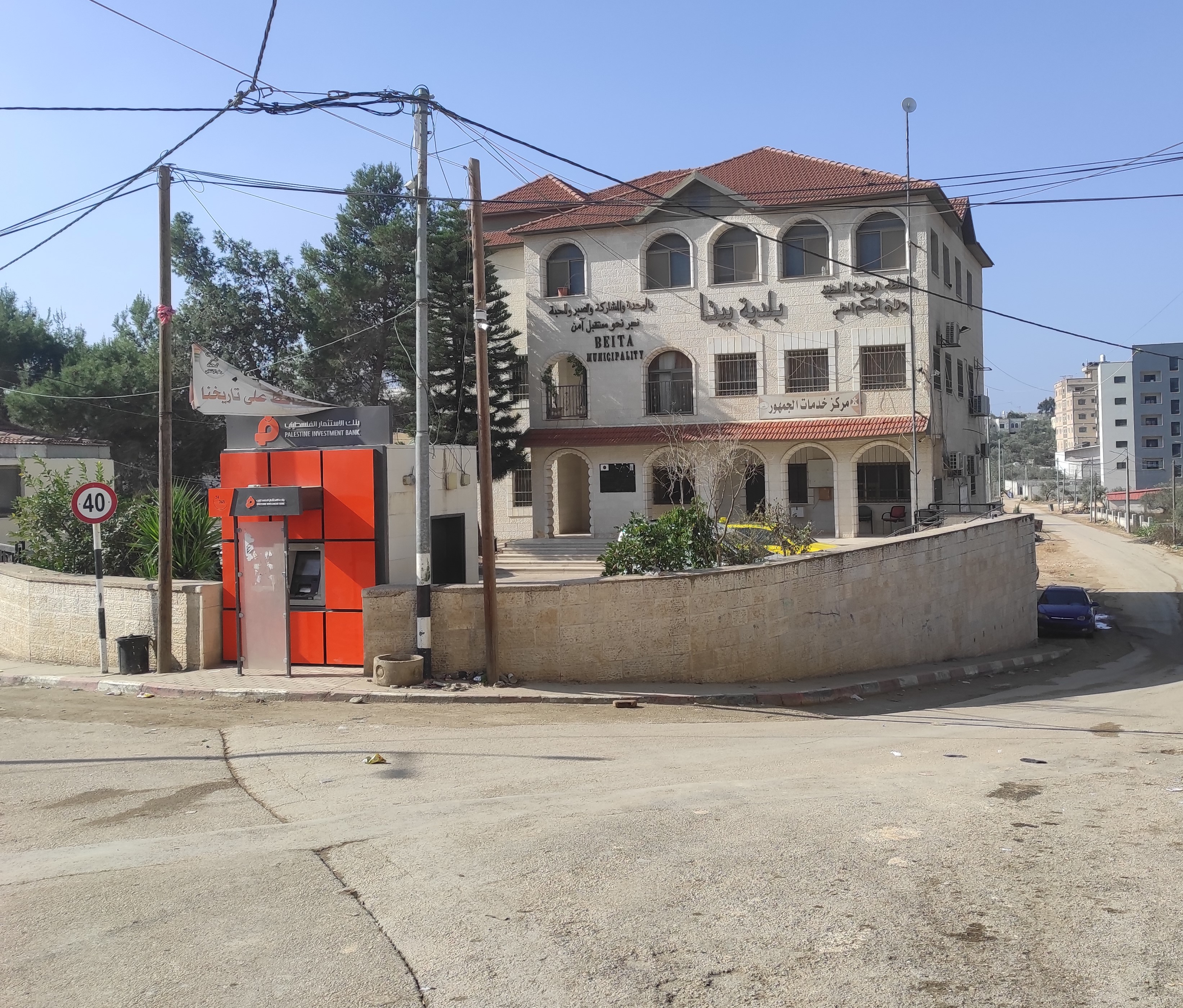
Beita municipality

Although the town was considered a Fatah stronghold, Arab ash-Shurafa, a member of Hamas, was elected mayor in 2005. Shurafa was arrested by the IDF, along with Nablus mayor Adly Yaish and Education Minister of the Palestinian National Authority Nasser al-Shaer in 2006 for their membership in Hamas.

==== Israeli-Palestinian conflict ====
In January 1988, 20 men from Beita and Huwara, identified by a GSS report after clashes with Israeli troops to have been involved in stone throwing, were assembled, bound, without their resisting, with plastic handcuffs and had their bones broken by soldiers, and then were abandoned at night in a muddy field. The International Red Cross made a formal complaint, after local press reports had been ignored. The army did not prosecute the matter initially. Lieutenant-colonel Yehuda Meir was reprimanded, and forced into retirement, with his officer's rank and pension rights intact. He was prosecuted only after the Association for Civil Rights in Israel made an issue of the matter by appealing to the Supreme Court which ruled that he had to stand trial, which then took place in April 1991. Meir was the local Nablus district commander overseeing the operation, and testified that he had acted under orders directly coming from Yitzhak Rabin and that when he had objected to bone-smashing, Rabin had replied: "You do the work, I'll take care of the media." His superiors testified that orders were only to use force in pursuit and arrests. The court believed the latter and found that the orders were legal, but that Meir had deviated from instructions.

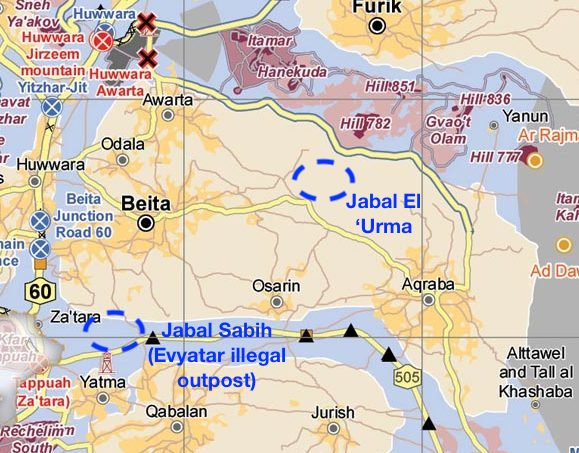
Beita and other Palestinian enclaves (yellow), Israeli settlements and Israeli-controlled Area C (magenta and blue)

On 10 April 2023, an estimated 15,000- 20,000 ultranationalist settlers, protected by a full battalion (1,000) of IDF soldiers and joined by the Israeli Security Minister Itamar Ben-Gvir, Bezalel Smotrich, 7 other ministers, and 20 parliamentarians, staged a march towards Evyatar, reportedly to pressure the new government under Benjamin Netanyahu to legalize the outpost. The given reason for their march was to retaliate for the murder of three members of the Dee family, British settlers, three days earlier, on 7 April, at the Hamra junction. Beita villagers protesting the march suffered 191 casualties, in large part from tear-gas intoxication. 17 were injured by rubber bullet shots fired by the army, while two were wounded in the head by gas canisters. Le Monde reported that journalists covering the event were also targeted, with one wearing a press vest also injured by a rubber bullet.

=== Beita Incident ===
On April 6, 1988, 16-20 teenage hikers from Elon Moreh, an Israeli settlement 10 kilometers (6.2 mi) north of Beita, set out for a trek. Nature-hiking among settlers was a symbolic means of demonstrating their control of the land. They were accompanied by two guards, both with a reputation for being aggressive Zionists: Roman Aldubi, a 26-year-old known extremist and religious militant banned by the IDF from entering Nablus for 6 months, after he had been convicted of obstruction of justice for hiding a gun used by another settler to kill an 11 year old Palestinian child, 'Aysha Bahash, in her father's bakery, during a stone-throwing incident; and Menahem Ilan (55), the organizer, were crossing village land in a show of strength, "to show them that we are the masters of the country", as one of the hikers later told ABC correspondent Barrie Dunsmore. (Ilan had previously been convicted in 1984 of obstructing justice and destroying evidence in a prior settler killing of a Palestinian girl.) When the settler group sat down to make breakfast near a spring, or a local well, local farmers sowing their spring crops became alarmed at the presence under armed guard, and one of them went to the village, a kilometre away, and the villagers were notified over the mosque's loudspeaker. The village lands were under military closure at the time, and, according to their accounts, they feared, based on other precedents in the area, that the local well might be poisoned. On such walks permission was never asked of villagers, furthermore, to trek through their fields, and Menachem Ilan had not alerted the IDF of his hiking plans in a remote Arab area. Several dozen farmers, among them some teenagers, gathered in proximity of the hikers. What took place was contested at that time.

At first, according to one version Aldubi fired warning shots from his Uzi at the farmers, some of whom threw stones. One of these shots is said, in one account, to have killed Mousa Saleh Bani Shamseh. In the IDF investigation, it was determined that Aldubi shot Mussa Saleh in the back at a distance of about 10 yards while the latter was fleeing. In another version, Ilan reprimanded him, and led the hikers away down a riverbed, where one girl was hit in the thigh by a stone and then Aldubi opened fire with Ilan's M-16 shooting Mousa Saleh in the head, killing him and wounding another farmer. Aldubi later said the man had tried to grab his rifle, a claim the IDF investigation later stated was unsubstantiated by any evidence. In one version, the hikers continued on and walked into the village, despite the incident. In the other, the villagers surrounded them, and led them to Beita.

When the Israelis entered Beita they were met by a crowd of villagers who had learned of the killing. The villagers were frightened by the sight of guns: the teenagers, in their account, were equally apprehensive on seeing furious villagers reportedly brandishing knives, pickaxes and clubs. The army investigation found that the villagers had no firearms. As the Israelis moved in a tight group through the village, the car carrying Mousa Saleh's corpse arrived, and stones were thrown. At one point, while her husband Taysir was burying his brother-in-law, Munira Daoud, who was also the deceased's sister, hit Aldubi in the head with a rock. Several villagers pushed through the crowd to save the teenagers. According to one report, Aldubi while falling sprayed his Uzi machine gun and killed Hatem Fayez Ahmad Al-Jaber and severely wounded several other villagers. The IDF investigation found that instead Aldubi squeezed off several shots as he turned around after being hit by a rock, and then fired again when one of the villagers tried to wrest his rifle from him.

As Aldubi fired, Tirza Porat, a 15-year-old member of his own group, was killed by a shot to the back of the head. He and Menachem were disarmed by the villagers, who smashed his gun. He received a serious head wound, and several others youths were hurt in the clash. One villager, Azzam Bani Shemseh, tried to revive Tirza by heart massage. The same family brought water to the teenagers, and another family gave refuge to three Israeli girls in their home. The villagers called for ambulances and guided the rest to the main road where they flagged down cars.

Initially, Israel media reported that Tirza Porat had been killed in an incident by bloodthirsty Arabs throwing stones. The Gush Emunim teenagers said Porat had been killed by a rooftop sniper. An official statement spoke of the group falling "into the hands of pogromists and murderers". Ariel Sharon called for the village to be emptied and for more settlements to be built. Israeli prime minister Yitzhak Shamir attended her funeral where cries of revenge were uttered and where Knesset member Haim Druckman declared that "the village of Beita must be wiped off the face of the earth," a remark that was met with "amens" from the crowd. The following day the Israel Defense Forces revealed that she been shot in the head by an M16 carbine belonging to Aldubi. It was also revealed that "the young settlers, instructed by their elders, had rendered untruthful accounts." Despite knowing from the start who was responsible, the Israeli first bulldozed six homes and then, after the report indicated Porat had not been killed by Palestinians, destroyed another eight in Beita, "giving people ample time to leave". Noam Chomsky states this was "a total lie", counting double the number of buildings destroyed including all their contents. On his own visit to Beita, 30 houses were either 'totally demolished or virtually destroyed.' They also killed a sixteen-year-old boy, Issam Abdul Halim Mohammad Said, and arrested all male adult residents, six of whom were deported on April 19.

==== Aftermath and Punishment ====
As soon as the Israeli army intervened, they shot dead a villager who they said was trying to run away. Within 48 hours of the incident, Major General Amram Mitzna, who had cordoned off the village he said to protect the residents and who declared no reprisals would be taken, interrogated all males between 16 and 60, and made hundreds of the villagers stand handcuffed and blindfolded all night. They said later they had been kicked, beaten and menaced until satisfactory testimonies had been given. IDF bulldozers uprooted dozens of olive trees and an almond grove nearby, which actually belonged to another Palestinian village. The army withheld the autopsy results, showing the girl had been killed by Aldubi's M-16 until the funeral was over. He then ordered the demolition of 14 homes in Beita, one of which had sheltered one of the Israeli hikers, after the army had established that Tirza Porat had not been shot by a Palestinian. The demolitions were ordered while the owners of 13 of the homes had not been charged with any crime. Over 60 members of the village were arrested, and 6 were expelled to Lebanon. Hamad Ben Ishams, whose house had been demolished, was imprisoned for seven months despite repeated evidence by his Israeli employer that Hamad had been at work with him in Israel at the time. The military judge preferred the testimony of one of the hikers Rami Hoffman who identified him as an assailant.

The official IDF investigation found that Ilan and Aldubi, the two escorts had 'escalat(ed) the crisis' by lack of caution and "hastiness in pulling the trigger," but the major cause for the incident was Palestinian aggressiveness and "readiness to harm Jewish hikers", and that they had a general plan to lure the hikers in their village.

Aldubi was still hospitalized a year later, and used a wheelchair. According to Noam Chomsky, who visited the village, the military commander told The New York Times that Aldubi would not be incriminated because "the tragic incidents were already penalty enough." The incident radicalized the village. One local some months later was reported as saying:

"Beita is different now because the people are revengeful... Now we know how the Israelis treat Palestinians, the way a wild animal treats a victim."

In May 1989, a Jaffa military court handed down stiff sentences to five of the members of the village of Beita suspected of throwing stones at Jewish hikers. The person convicted of the most serious crime got an eight-year sentence, of which 3 were to be served. Two others sentenced to five-year terms were to serve 21 months, a fourth 18 months and the fifth two years. A further 11 Beitans were slated to stand trial later on the same charges.

On 14 April 1991 an Elon Moreh settler, Pinhas Assayag (22), murdered a Beita resident, Jamil Dweikat (50). Arrested on 19 June 1991, he also confessed to killing a 22 year old shepherd, Radi a-Ouna from the nearby village of 'Azmut earlier in January of that year. After an investigation, he was committed to an Israeli mental hospital.

=== May–September 2021 series of protester killings ===
Beita's remaining lands were the object of a further attempt at illegal Israeli settlement early in 2020, when an attempt was made to seize an area called Jabal Orma. That venture was eventually abandoned in the wake of local demonstrations, in which two protesting villagers were shot dead.

In May, 2021, in the period of the 2021 demonstrations, Israeli settlers in caravans seized the top of Jabel Sbeih, a site which Beita residents insist is privately owned Palestinian land. Jabel Sbeih lies on the village's outskirts. The new illegal outpost, named Evyatar was reportedly designed to split up and fragment Palestinian areas to its north, south, east and west. Over the following months, in response to repeated demonstrations against the establishment of Evyatar, Israeli forces shot dead, on different occasions, seven residents of Beita, and another Palestinian youth from nearby Yatma. Over this period an estimated 1,000 have been injured in clashes with the Israeli army, while the Israeli government reportedly assisted the development of the site with paved roads, water lines, and electricity.

In June, 2021, Israel destroyed $100,000 worth of vegetables in Beita by firing teargas at a vegetable storage unit.

In the same month the new government of Naphtali Bennett reached an agreement with the settlers to evacuate in exchange for a promise to maintain the infrastructure and convert the outpost into a yeshiva. The deal foresees the return of the settlers if Israel declares the area state land in the future. Beita and nearby villages have petitioned the Israeli Supreme Court to revoke the terms of the agreement. On August 14, 2021, Beita protesters erected a wooden star of David in the center of which was a swastika, set fire to the structure and highlighted the event with a video on social media.

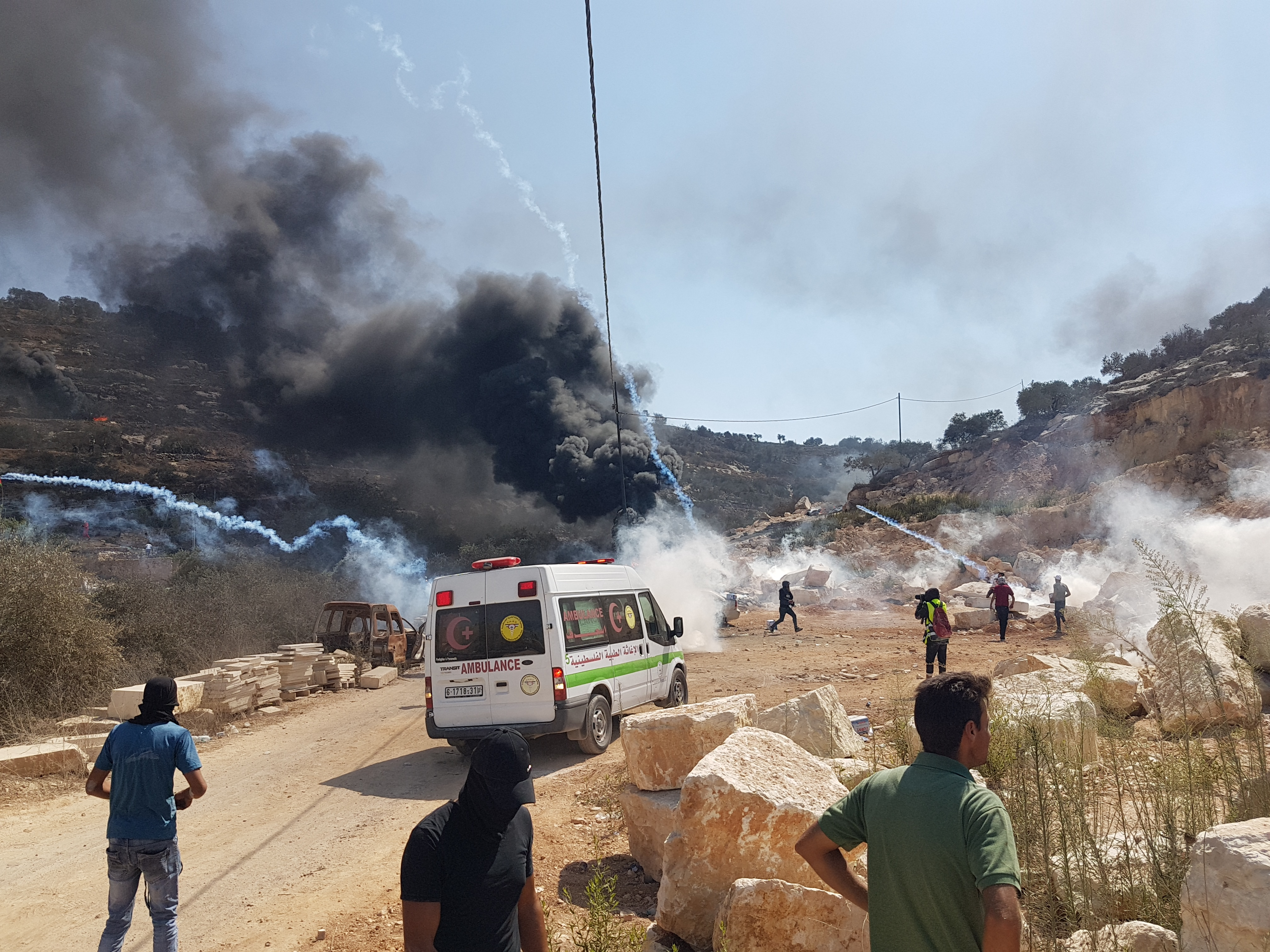
Protest in Beita against Evyatar outpost. 3 Sept 2021

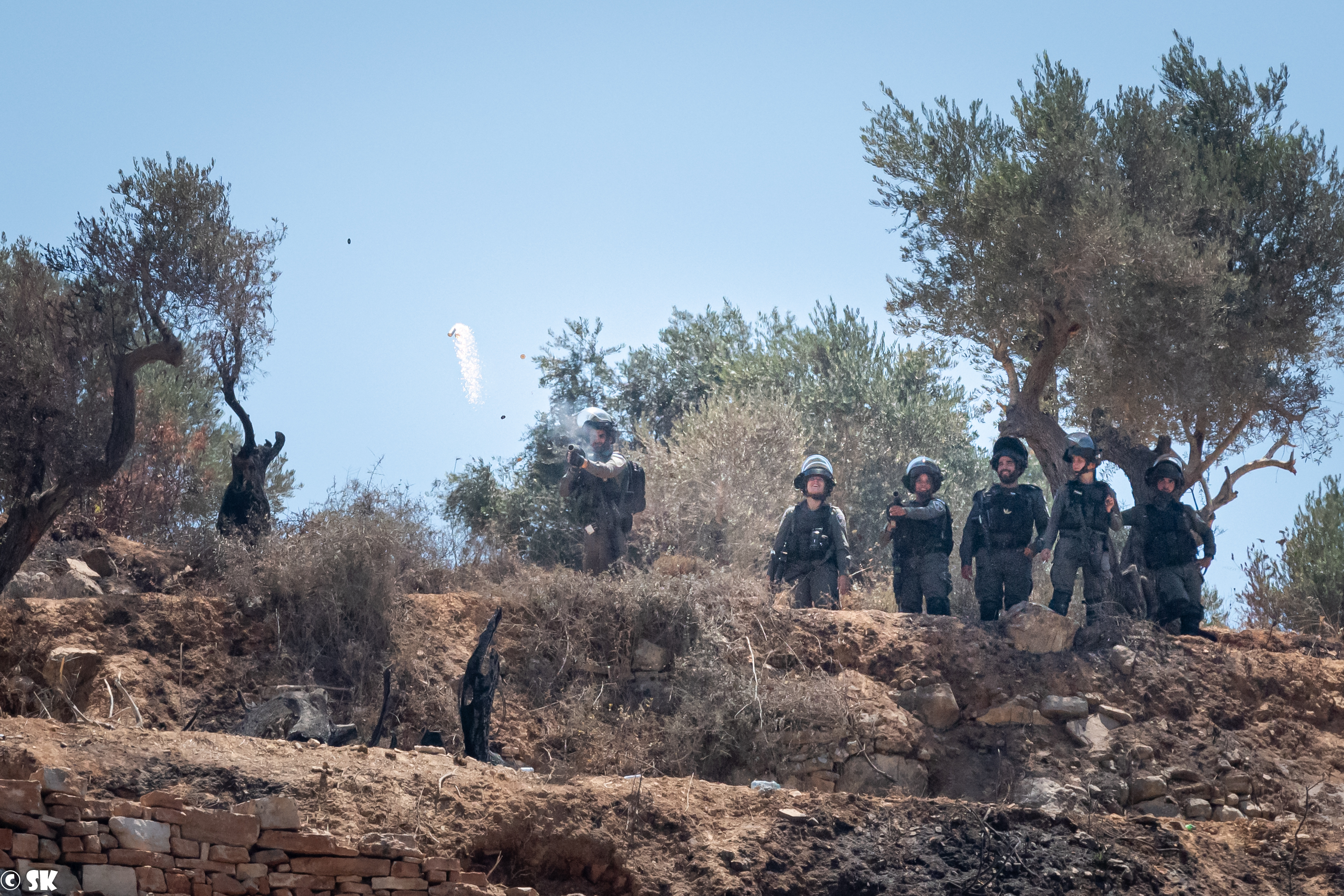
tear gas shut on protesters in Beita, July 2021

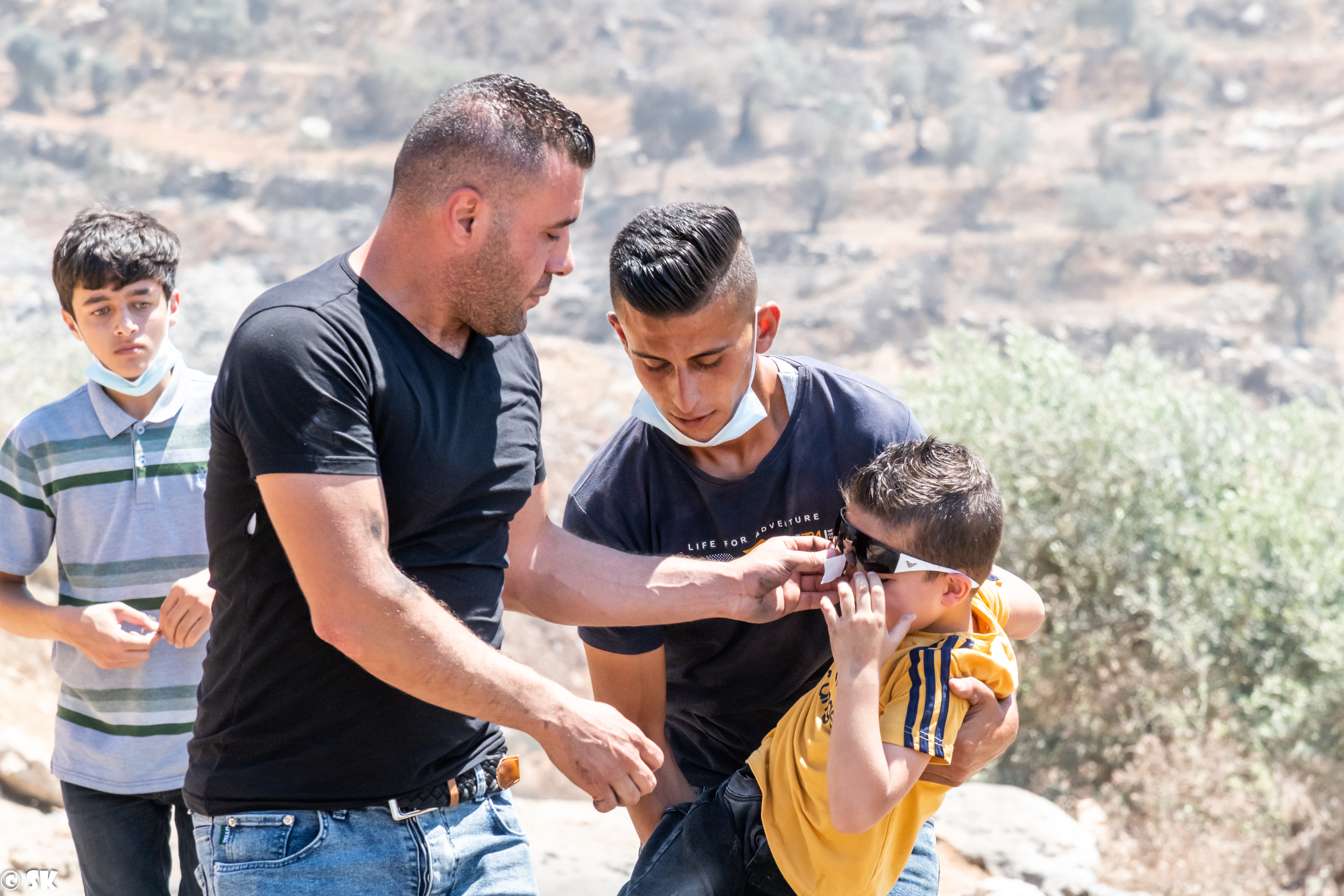
Child hurt from tear gas during protest against Evyatar outpost, July 2021

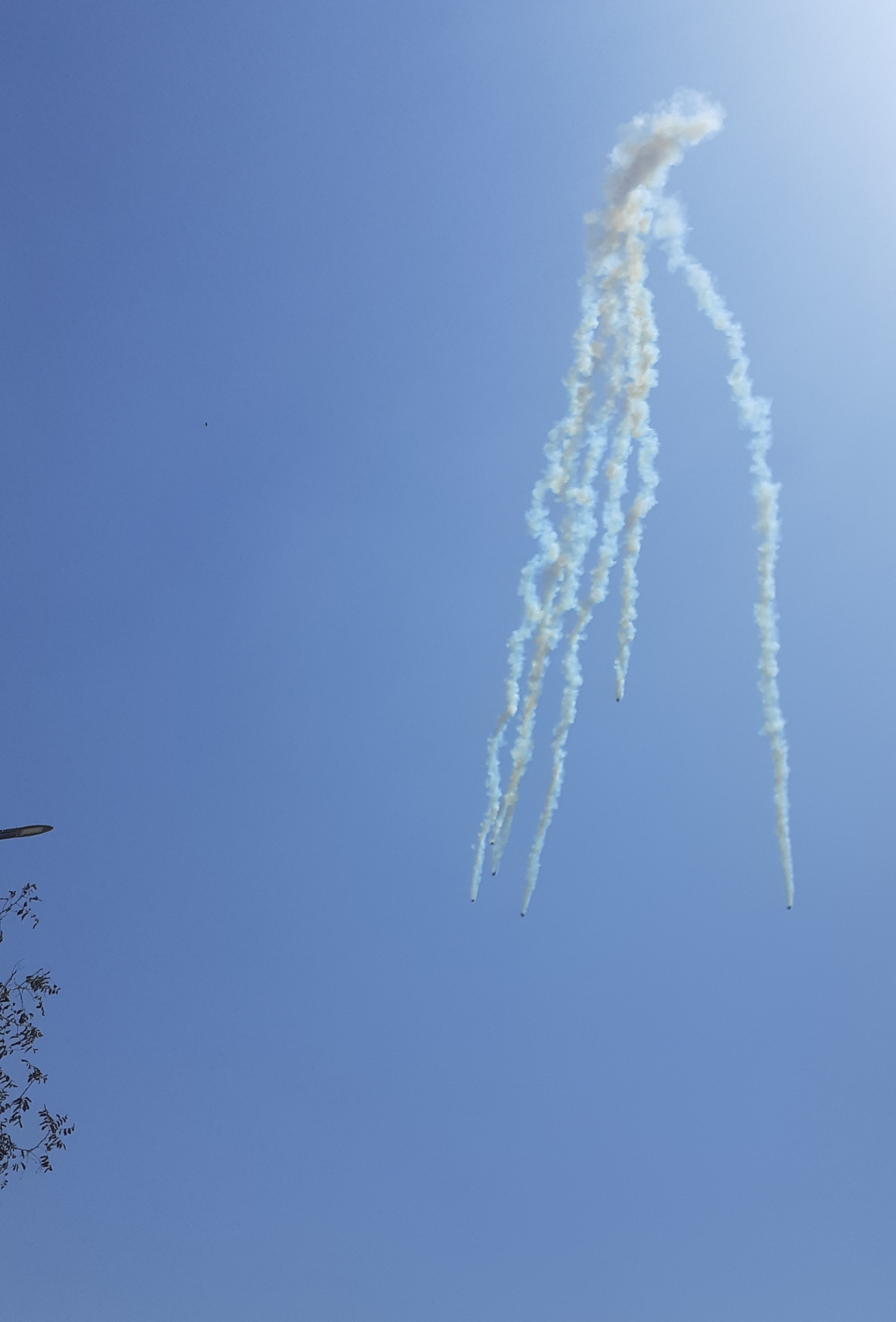
Tear gas from drone on protesters, Beita September 2021

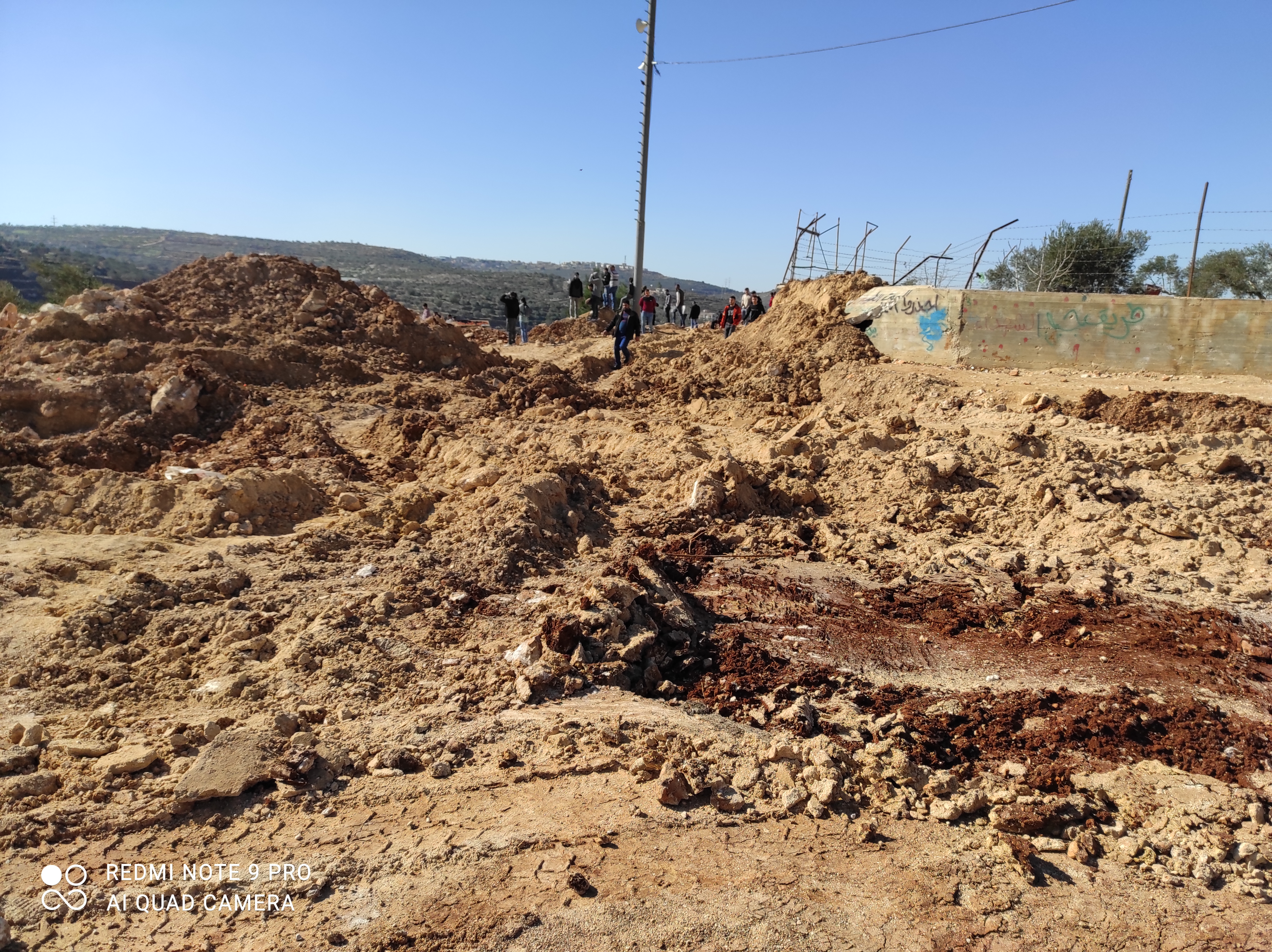
A road destroyed by an Israeli army bulldozer to prevent protesters from approaching Evyatar outpost. Beita, January 2022

Those killed are

- On 14 May, Dr. Issa Barham, a legal scholar, expert in international law, who worked for the prosecutor's office in Salfit, was shot dead after he responded to a call from the mosque for volunteers to help evacuate those wounded by Israeli army fire during a Friday demonstration. Ambulances couldn't cope, and he drove his Hyundai Tucson SUV to the scene. According to Palestinians present, as he was walking over to a group of wounded, an Israeli sniper knelt down, aimed and a single shot rang out. Barham died of a gunshot wound to the stomach.
- Zakaria Hamayel (26) a schoolteacher of Arabic, was shot dead while looking for a place to say his afternoon prayers in a break from a demonstration against the illegal settlement. A medic wearing the characteristic phosphorescent vest was shot in the thigh as he tried to assist Hamayel.
- 11 June. Mohammed Hamayel (16), high school student was shot in the centre of the chest at a distance of a few dozen metres by one of 4 soldiers spread out on the ground. His cousin was wounded
- Ahmad Bani Shamseh (17) was shot dead. The IDF account said he was killed for throwing an 'explosive device'.
- On 27 July, Shadi Shurafi, Beita's village plumber, was shot dead by a soldier from the Israeli Kfir Brigade as he stood, according to the Palestinian account, with a monkey wrench in his hand by the broken main of the village water supply. His body, according to Gideon Levy, was one of 300 Israel had yet to hand back to mourning families, apparently as exchange material for the return of the remains of two soldiers killed in battle inside the Gaza Strip. After some weeks, Israel returned it for burial. Israeli spokesmen stated that he was shot after ignoring warning shots as he charged the soldiers with a wrench in his hand.
- On 6 August, Imad Duikat (38), a father of five, was shot dead with a .22 bullet to the chest while reportedly sipping water from a disposable cup near an ambulance at the protest site. On the same afternoon, 6 other Beita residents were hit by live fire and over 100 were injured by tear gas and rubber-tipped metal bullets. The IDF said stones were thrown and tires burnt in what they termed a 'violent demonstration'.
- On 24 September Muhammad Ali Khabisa(28) became the 7th victim to be shot dead, reportedly while sitting under an olive tree, during a further Friday protest over the Evyatar settlement. A sniper bullet smashed his skull.

On 6 September 2024, with a shot to the head, Israel troops killed an American-Turkish woman, Ayşenur Ezgi Eygi (26), who had gone to Beita as a volunteer for an International Solidarity Group. Another American volunteer had been shot in the leg in the preceding August. Eygi's death brought the number of protesters shot dead by Israeli forces in Beita since 2021 to 10.

== Demography ==
=== Local origins ===
Some of the Beita's residents are Bedouins from Gaza and Hebron.

== Bibliography ==
- Barron, J.B., ed. (1923). Palestine: Report and General Abstracts of the Census of 1922. Government of Palestine.
- Barzilai, G. (2002). Wars, Internal Conflicts, and Political Order: A Jewish Democracy in the Middle East. SUNY Press. ISBN 0791495906.
- Chomsky, N. (1999). Fateful Triangle - The United States, Israel, and the Palestinians (Updated ed.). London: Pluto Press. ISBN 0-7453-1530-5.
- Cockburn, A. (1988). Corruptions of Empire: Life Studies & the Reagan Era. Verso. ISBN 0860919404.
- Conder, C.R.; Kitchener, H.H. (1882). The Survey of Western Palestine: Memoirs of the Topography, Orography, Hydrography, and Archaeology. Vol. 2. London: Committee of the Palestine Exploration Fund.
- Conroy, John (2001). Unspeakable Acts, Ordinary People: The Dynamics of Torture. California: University of California Press. ISBN 0-520-23039-6.
- Finkelstein, I.; Lederman, Zvi, eds. (1997). Highlands of many cultures. Tel Aviv: Institute of Archaeology of Tel Aviv University Publications Section. ISBN 965-440-007-3.
- Frankel, G. (1996). Beyond the Promised Land: Jews and Arabs on the Hard Road to a New Israel. Simon and Schuster. ISBN 0684823470.
- Government of Jordan, Department of Statistics (1964). First Census of Population and Housing. Volume I: Final Tables; General Characteristics of the Population (PDF).
- Government of Palestine, Department of Statistics (1945). Village Statistics, April, 1945.
- Hadawi, S. (1970). Village Statistics of 1945: A Classification of Land and Area ownership in Palestine. Palestine Liberation Organization Research Center.
- Hütteroth, W.-D.; Abdulfattah, K. (1977). Historical Geography of Palestine, Transjordan and Southern Syria in the Late 16th Century. Erlanger Geographische Arbeiten, Sonderband 5. Erlangen, Germany: Vorstand der Fränkischen Geographischen Gesellschaft. ISBN 3-920405-41-2.
- Kelly, Robert J.; Maghan, Jess (1998). Hate Crime: The Global Politics of Polarization. SIU Press. ISBN 0809322102.
- Lockman, Zackary; Beinin, J., eds. (1989). Intifada: The Palestinian Uprising Against Israeli Occupation. South End Press. ISBN 0-89608-363-2.
- Mills, E., ed. (1932). Census of Palestine 1931. Population of Villages, Towns and Administrative Areas. Jerusalem: Government of Palestine.
- Palmer, E.H. (1881). The Survey of Western Palestine: Arabic and English Name Lists Collected During the Survey by Lieutenants Conder and Kitchener, R. E. Transliterated and Explained by E.H. Palmer. Committee of the Palestine Exploration Fund.
- Robinson, E.; Smith, E. (1841). Biblical Researches in Palestine, Mount Sinai and Arabia Petraea: A Journal of Travels in the year 1838. Vol. 2. Boston: Crocker & Brewster.
