= Nadab and Abihu =

Sons of Aaron

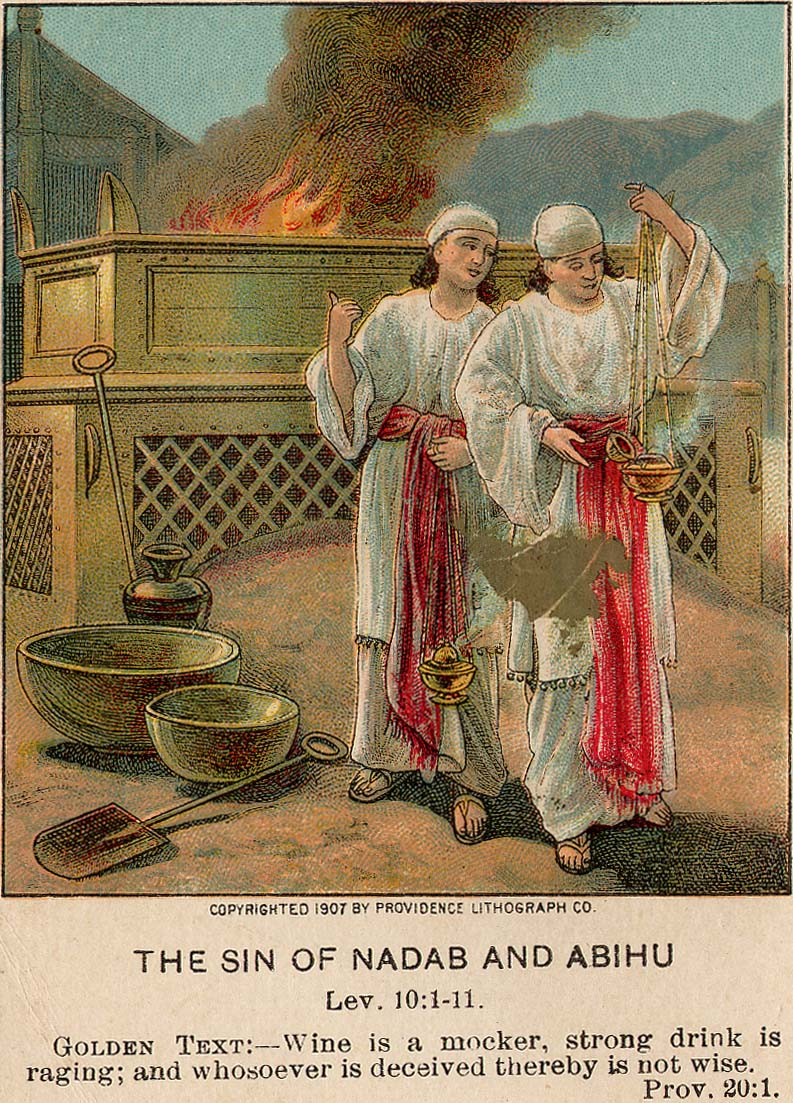
Illustration of the sin of Nadab and Abihu, from a 1907 holy card.

In the biblical books of Exodus, Leviticus and Numbers, Nadab (Hebrew: נָדָב, Modern: Nadav, Tiberian: Nāḏāḇ, "generous") and Avihu (Hebrew: אֲבִיהוּא, Modern: ʾAvīhūʾ, Tiberian: ʾĂḇīhūʾ, "my father [is] he") were the two oldest sons of Aaron. According to Leviticus 10, they offered a sacrifice with "foreign fire" or "unauthorized coals" before Yahweh, disobeying his instructions, and were immediately consumed by the fire of God.

Moses instructed Aaron and his family not to mourn, although the people at large were permitted.

== Background ==
Nadab and Abihu were the first two sons of Aaron by his marriage to Elisheba, daughter of Amminadab from the tribe of Judah. They had four sons in total; the younger two sons were Eleazar and Ithamar. During the Exodus journey, after the Israelites affirmed their covenant with Yahweh in Exodus 24:3-8 Avihu and Nadav accompanied Moses, Aaron, and seventy elders up Biblical Mount Sinai. There they saw Yahweh with great clarity, walking on a pavement of sapphire stone, and shared a meal in God's presence, without being harmed.

Aaron and his four sons were the first Levites appointed as God established the priestly system. The Levites as a tribe were later ordained for the priestly service after answering a call to take Yahweh's side after the idolatry centered on the golden calf. After the death of Nadab and Abihu, Eleazar and Ithamar took their places as priests, because neither Nadab nor Abihu had any sons.

== Violation of God's law and punishment ==
In Exodus 30 and Leviticus, God outlines a proper sacrifice to him. Aaron, the chief priest, was to present all offerings representing himself and the people.

Then Moses said to Aaron: “Come forward to the altar and sacrifice your sin offering and your burnt offering, making expiation for yourself and for the people; and sacrifice the people’s offering and make expiation for them, as יהוה has commanded.”

— Leviticus 9:7, New Jewish Publication Society of America Tanakh

God would send his fire to consume the sacrifice as a sign of his presence.

When the fire from God came and consumed the sacrifice, it was perceived as a token of God’s glory and favor. And this sacred fire, which Yahweh had kindled, was to be used to burn the incense. But Nadab and Abihu, when they took their censers to burn fragrant incense, they used a different fire, a strange fire, not the fire which Yahweh kindled and commanded to be used for this purpose; a fire came from heaven and devoured them in front of the congregation.

The Jewish Study Bible notes that when Nadav and Avihu lit the offering in the censers, their fire was profane. They prepared an incense offering on kindling, not incense on the altar. This was seen as foreign or unholy fire (Hebrew: אֵ֣שׁ זָרָ֔ה, romanized: ēš zārā).

The exegesis of Adam Clarke (d. 1836) notes that anyone who altered the sacrificial system assumed a prerogative belonging to God alone.

== Burial and mourning ==
=== Burial ===
After the death of Nadab and Abihu, Moses dictated what was to be done with their bodies. He told Mishael and Elzaphan, the sons of Uzziel, Aaron's, his own and their sister Miriam's uncle, to carry the bodies away from the sanctuary to a place outside of the camp. He specified for Mishael and Elzaphan to be careful to only touch Nadab and Abihu's tunics, and not their bodies. The first concerns in burial were to prevent what is holy from being defiled and the service of God from being disrupted. The corpses had to be removed immediately, because to allow the uncleanliness of the bodies to remain in the sanctuary could invoke God's wrath again. The bodies were lifted up "by their tunics" to avoid direct physical contact. This did not prevent the carriers from becoming ritually unclean, but lessened the time and procedures needed to restore them to ritual purity.

=== Mourning ===
Aaron and the other surviving priests were commanded not to mourn, participate in mourning rituals, or have contact with the dead. This was applicable not only in this case; but it was modified in an ongoing command. While priests could mourn, they could not have contact with the dead—even a dead spouse, parent or child—and they could not participate in public mourning rituals. As the representatives of the people, priests were to avoid anything that might disqualify them for God's service. They were to remain ready and able to act in God's service whenever the community needed them.

The command not to mourn also applied because the crime of Nadab and Abihu was so provoking to God and fully merited the punishment which God had inflicted. To mourn in this case could be seen by the people as accusing God of undue severity. Both the people and the priests needed to show submission to a righteous judgement. If the anointed priests were to sin in this manner, the blame would fall not only upon them but also upon the people. In addition, all Jews are prohibited from mourning on the Sabbath and during festivals of the Lord. These are days for celebration, no sorrow is permitted to impinge upon the joy of the days.

However, the people in the community as a whole were allowed to mourn and display grief. The death of Nadab and Abihu was tragic yet deserved, and the people were to first recognize that it was deserved and then mourn their death.

== In Judaism ==
The sin of Nadab and Abihu was a serious violation of the duties reserved for their father, the high priest. However, their offense was not limited to just overstepping boundaries; it involved multiple transgressions. First, without authorization, they took it upon themselves to perform the incense service, the most sacred and important priestly responsibilities. Second, they collaborated in a task that only the high priest was allowed to carry out. Lastly, they assumed the responsibility of lighting the fire offering themselves. In doing so, they "offered foreign fire before the Lord," demonstrating a presumptuous and unauthorized intrusion into a sacred role not rightfully theirs. In these actions, they showed carelessness, irreverence, and a want of faith—especially grievous for those in the priestly service. A precedent of such evil tendency was dangerous, and it was imperatively necessary for the priests and the sacred items that God should give a punishment.

== In Christianity ==
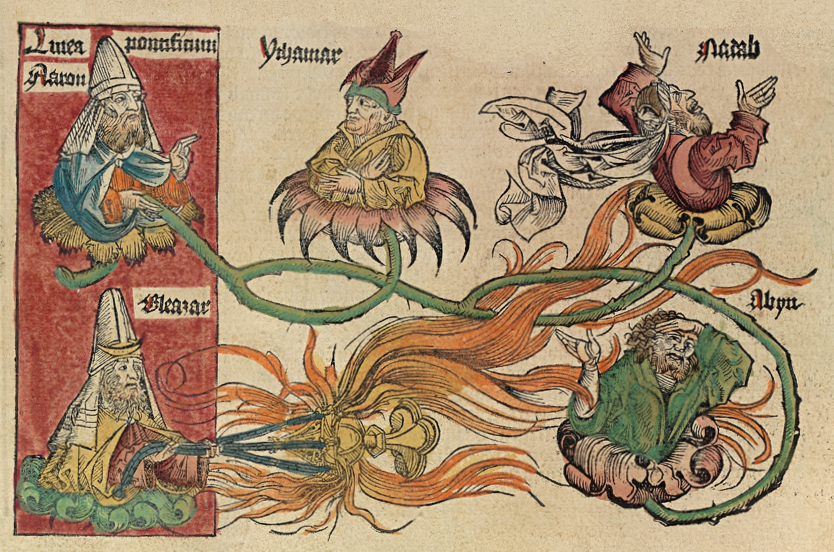
from the 1493 Nuremberg Chronicle which includes Nadab and Abihu.

=== Roman Catholicism ===
Whether Nadab and Abihu neglected to follow God's outlined sacrificial system out of presumptuousness, or out of thoughtlessness and inattention, their fault was severely punished so that all might learn to comply exactly with God's commands, and not try to change them or explain them away. The mixing of falsehood with the word of God was a serious sin. Those in power, like priests, should be especially careful in their behavior, because they are examples to those they serve.

=== Reformation and Post-Reformation views ===
Nadab and Abihu were in a great position to become honorable and respected priests. If Nadab and Abihu's deed had been done through ignorance, they would have been told to bring a sin-offering. But instead they did it presumptuously (deliberately and arrogantly), and in contempt of God's majesty and justice. They were therefore cut off, for the wages of sin is death. The sin and punishment of these priests showed the imperfection of that priesthood from the very beginning, and that it could not shelter any from the fire of God's wrath.

=== Seventh-day Adventists views ===
Nadab and Abihu were not trained in their formative years, to develop habits of self-control as well as respect and obedience to authority. They saw their father, Aaron, yielding to the pressure of the multitudes and making for them a golden calf against the will of the Lord. This is a call to parents, especially Godly parents to set a good example of strict and exemplary obedience to God’s laws.

Nadab and Abihu are also believed to have been intoxicated at the time of their sin. Therefore, their minds were not as clear as they should have been in preparation to the service of the Lord. This is the reason that following their transgression, the Lord instructed Aaron and his remaining children to never drink wine or strong drink. The same obligation rests upon God’s children today, to ensure that they avoid anything that may alter their state of mind and diminish their service to the Lord.
