= Yatma =

- Municipality type D (Village council)

Arabic transcription(s)
  - Arabic: يتما
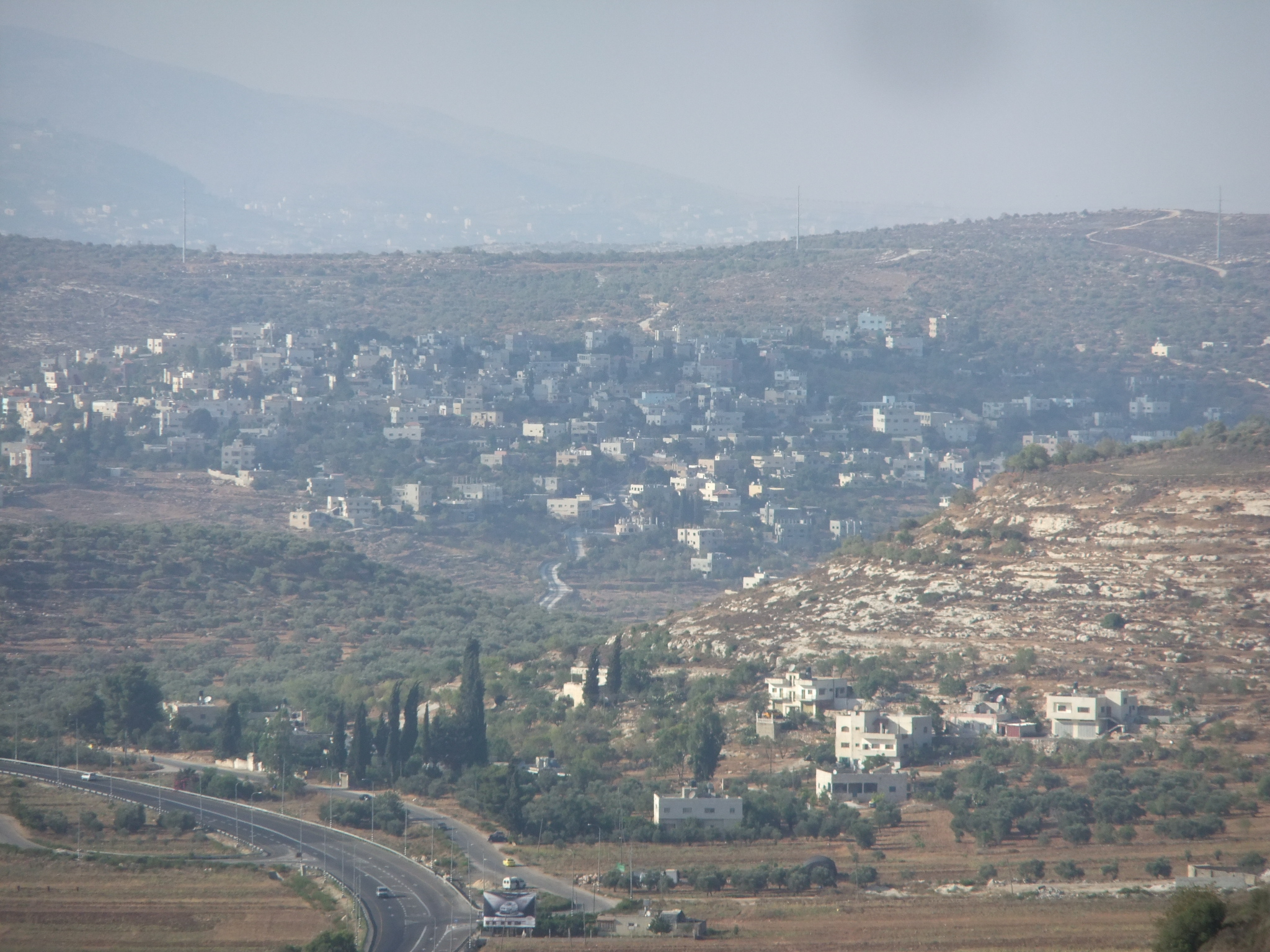
- Yatma, 2012

- Location of Yatma within Palestine
- Coordinates: 32°06′30″N 35°16′06″E
- Palestine grid: 175/168
- State: State of Palestine
- Governorate: Nablus

Government
  - Type: Village council

Population (2017)
  - Total: 3,363
- Name meaning: from Yetma, personal name

Yatma (Arabic: يتما) is a Palestinian town in the Nablus Governorate in northern West Bank, located 15 kilometers south of Nablus. According to the Palestinian Central Bureau of Statistics (PCBS), the town had a population of 3,363 inhabitants in 2017.

== Location ==
Yatma is located 12.4 km south of Nablus. It is bordered by Qabalan to the east and south, Beita to the north, Yasuf and As Sawiya to the west.

== History ==
Pottery sherds from the Iron Age II, Persian, Hellenistic/Roman and the Crusader/Ayyubid eras have been found here.

It has been suggested that this was the place of origin of Dosthai of Kefar Iathma who is mentioned in the Mishnah as a disciple of the House of Shammai, and that it was the Eincheitem of the Crusader period.

Sherds from the Mamluk era has also been found here.

=== Ottoman era ===
In 1517, the village was included in the Ottoman Empire with the rest of Palestine, and in the 1596 tax-records it appeared as Yitma, located in the Nahiya of Jabal Qubal of the Liwa of Nablus. The population was 10 households and 2 bachelors, all Muslim. They paid a fixed tax rate of 33,3% on agricultural products, such as wheat, barley, summer crops, olive trees, goats and beehives, a press for olive oil or grape syrup, in addition to occasional revenues and a fixed tax for people of Nablus area; a total of 1,800 akçe. Sherds from the early Ottoman era have also been found here.

In 1838, Edward Robinson noted it as part of Jurat Merda District, south of Nablus.

In 1850/1 de Saulcy noted Yatma on his travels in the region, as did Victor Guérin in 1870.

In 1870/1871 (1288 AH), an Ottoman census listed the village in the nahiya (sub-district) of Jamma'in al-Thani, subordinate to Nablus.

In 1882, the Palestine Exploration Fund's Survey of Western Palestine Yetma was described as "A little village, on high ground, with olives round it."

=== British Mandate era ===
In the 1922 census of Palestine conducted by the British Mandate authorities, Yatma had a population of 242 Muslims, increasing in the 1931 census to 325 Muslims, in 64 houses.

In the 1945 statistics the population was 440 Muslims while the total land area was 3,777 dunams, according to an official land and population survey. Of this, 1,214 dunams were used for plantations and irrigable land, 1,741 for cereals, while 44 dunams were classified as built-up areas.

=== Jordanian era ===
In the wake of the 1948 Arab–Israeli War, and after the 1949 Armistice Agreements, Yatma came under Jordanian rule.

The Jordanian census of 1961 found 618 inhabitants.

=== Post 1967 ===
Since the Six-Day War in 1967, Yatma has been under Israeli occupation. According to the Israeli census taken that year, the village had a population of 681.

After the 1995 accords, 29% of village land is defined as Area B land, while the remaining 71% is defined as Area C land. Israel has also confiscated village land for Israeli bypass roads.

In 2011, two cars were set ablaze in Yatma and the village mosque was vandalised with Hebrew graffiti, reading "price tag" and "Migron", in what was assumed to be a price tag attack by Israeli settlers.

== Bibliography ==
- Barron, J.B., ed. (1923). Palestine: Report and General Abstracts of the Census of 1922. Government of Palestine.
- Conder, C.R.; Kitchener, H.H. (1882). The Survey of Western Palestine: Memoirs of the Topography, Orography, Hydrography, and Archaeology. Vol. 2. London: Committee of the Palestine Exploration Fund.
- Finkelstein, I.; Lederman, Zvi, eds. (1997). Highlands of many cultures. Tel Aviv: Institute of Archaeology of Tel Aviv University Publications Section. ISBN 965-440-007-3.
- Government of Jordan, Department of Statistics (1964). First Census of Population and Housing. Volume I: Final Tables; General Characteristics of the Population (PDF).
- Government of Palestine, Department of Statistics (1945). Village Statistics, April, 1945.
- Guérin, V. (1875). Description Géographique Historique et Archéologique de la Palestine (in French). Vol. 2: Samarie, pt. 2. Paris: L'Imprimerie Nationale.
- Hadawi, S. (1970). Village Statistics of 1945: A Classification of Land and Area ownership in Palestine. Palestine Liberation Organization Research Center.
- Hütteroth, W.-D.; Abdulfattah, K. (1977). Historical Geography of Palestine, Transjordan and Southern Syria in the Late 16th Century. Erlanger Geographische Arbeiten, Sonderband 5. Erlangen, Germany: Vorstand der Fränkischen Geographischen Gesellschaft. ISBN 3-920405-41-2.
- Mills, E., ed. (1932). Census of Palestine 1931. Population of Villages, Towns and Administrative Areas. Jerusalem: Government of Palestine.
- Neubauer, A. (1868). La géographie du Talmud : mémoire couronné par l'Académie des inscriptions et belles-lettres (in French). Paris: Lévy.
- Palmer, E.H. (1881). The Survey of Western Palestine: Arabic and English Name Lists Collected During the Survey by Lieutenants Conder and Kitchener, R. E. Transliterated and Explained by E.H. Palmer. Committee of the Palestine Exploration Fund.
- Robinson, E.; Smith, E. (1841). Biblical Researches in Palestine, Mount Sinai and Arabia Petraea: A Journal of Travels in the year 1838. Vol. 3. Boston: Crocker & Brewster.
- Saulcy, L.F. de (1854). Narrative of a journey round the Dead Sea, and in the Bible lands, in 1850 and 1851. Vol. 1, new edition. London: R. Bentley.
