= Hill of Phinehas =

Holy site in Awarta, West Bank

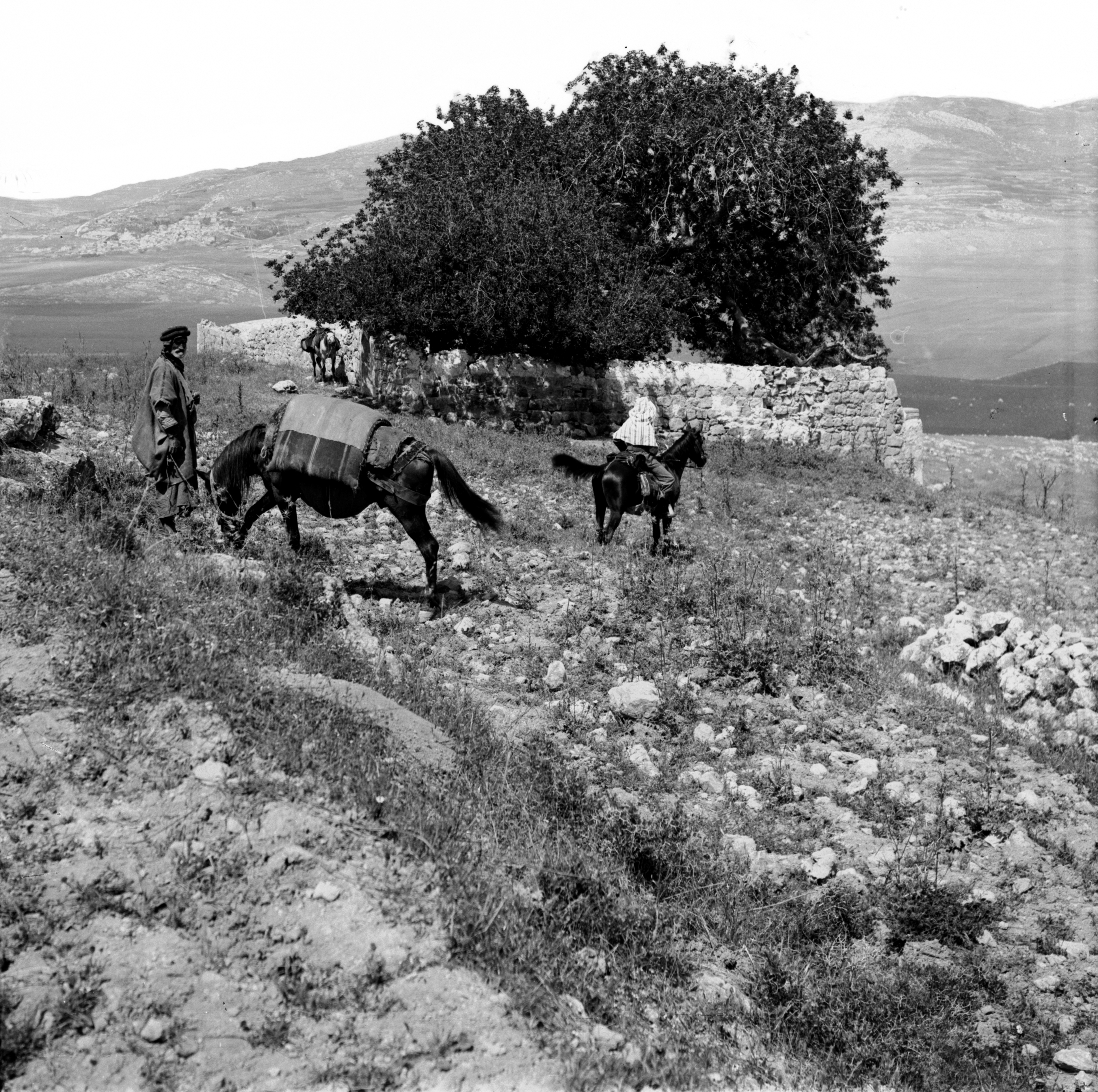
Northern views. Awerta, tombs of Eleazar and Phinehas

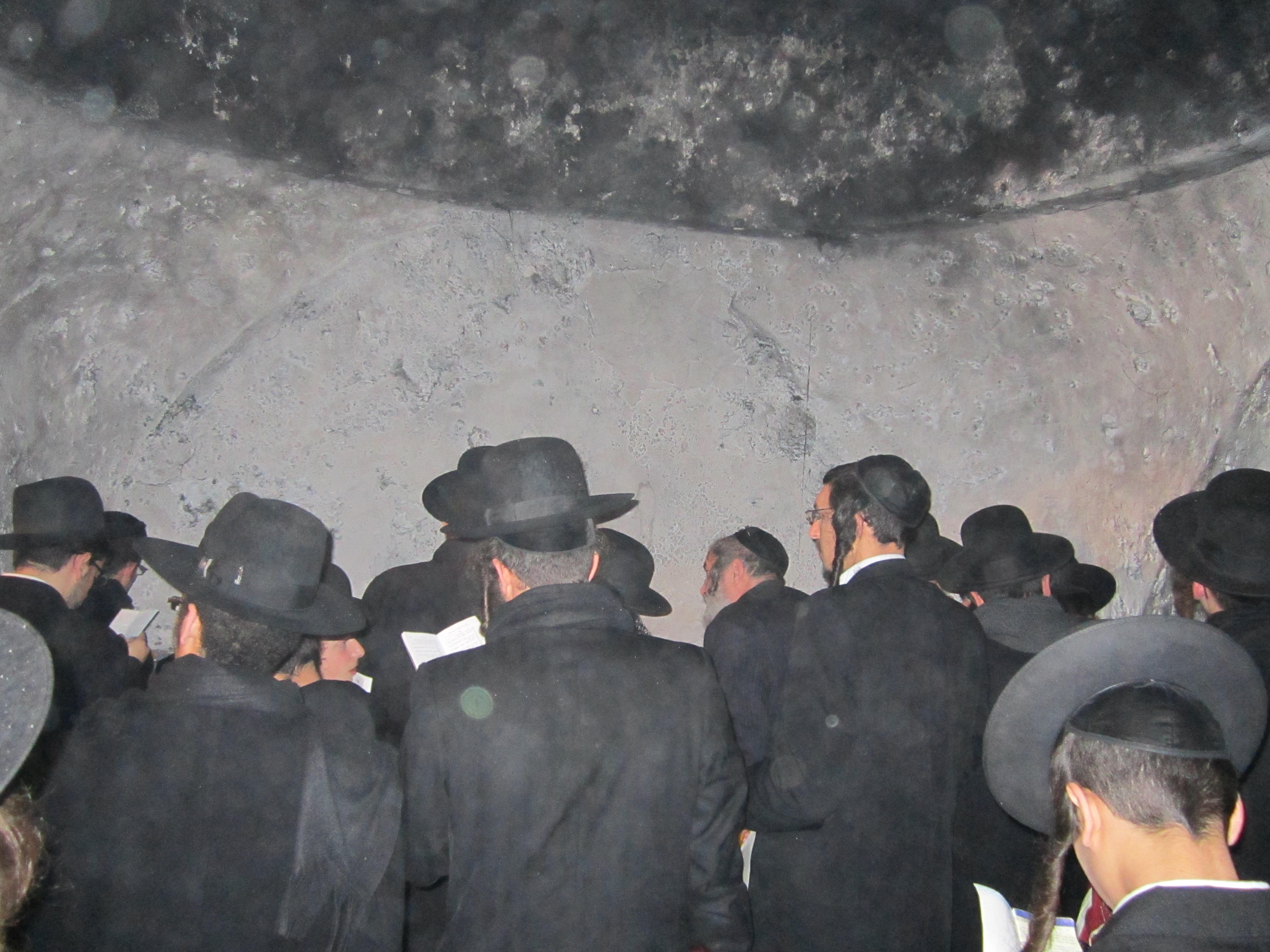
Tomb of the seventy

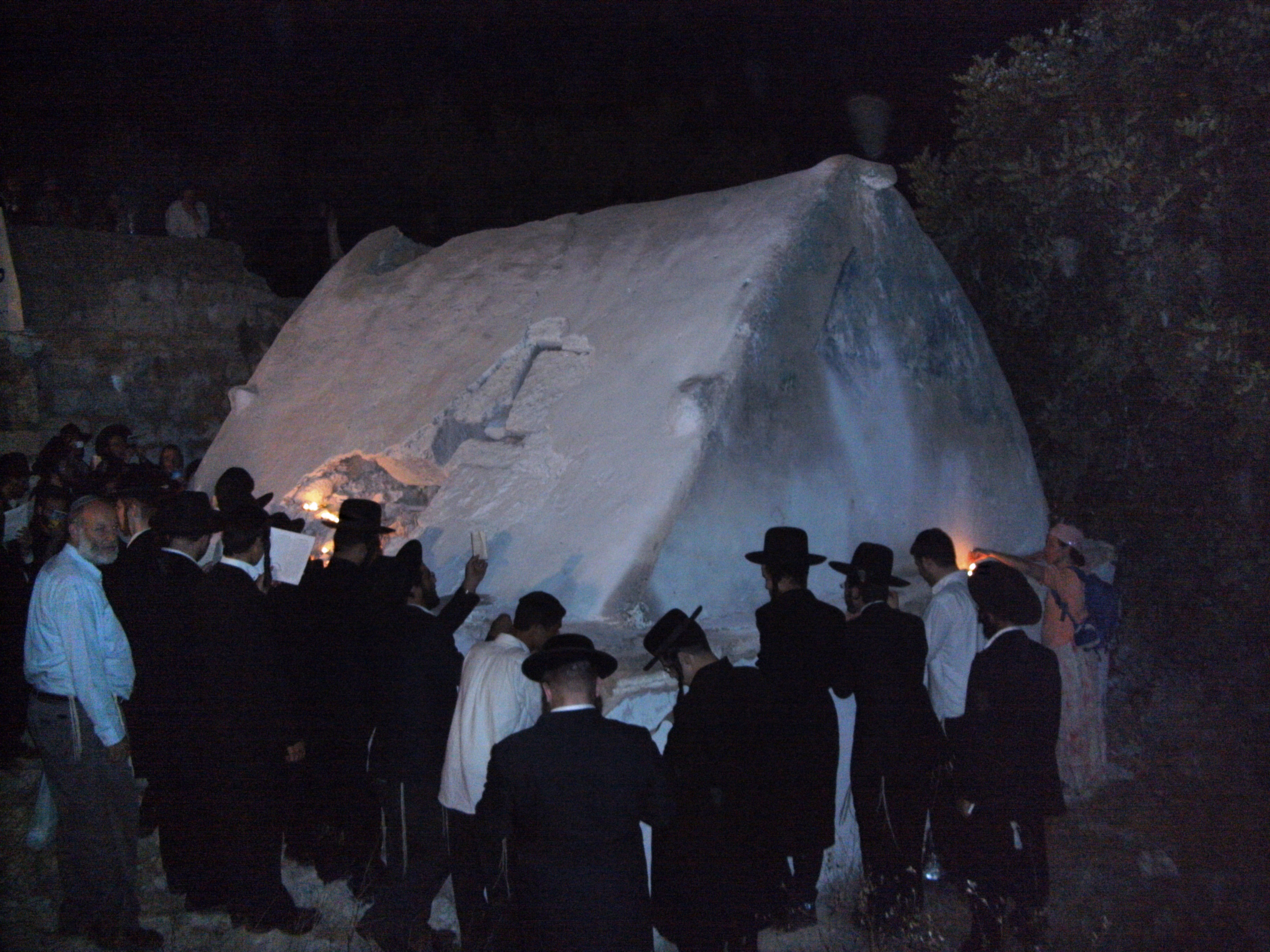
Tomb of Elazar and Ithamar

The Hill of Phinehas is a location described in the Bible Joshua 24:33 as being the burial place of Eleazar and Ithamar.

It is associated with the location of the village of Awarta in the West Bank. In the early 18th century, the site was purchased by a Samaritan, Abraham Danafi, to be used by the community.

Large tombs in the town have been attributed to the burial sites of Aaron's sons Ithamar and Eleazar. His grandson Phinehas is believed to be buried at the site alongside his son Abishua — the latter is especially revered by the Samaritans, who believe that he wrote the Torah. The seventy Elders are believed to be buried in a cave near Phinehas' tomb. On the western side of Awarta lies the tomb Muslims attribute to Nabi Uzeir, Ezra the scribe.

== Bibliography ==
- Robinson, Edward; Smith, Eli (1841). Biblical Researches in Palestine, Mount Sinai and Arabia Petraea: A Journal of Travels in the year 1838. Vol. 3. Boston: Crocker & Brewster.
- https://archive.org/stream/adescriptivegeo00schwgoog#page/n186/mode/2up
