= Nahshon =

Judahite tribal leader

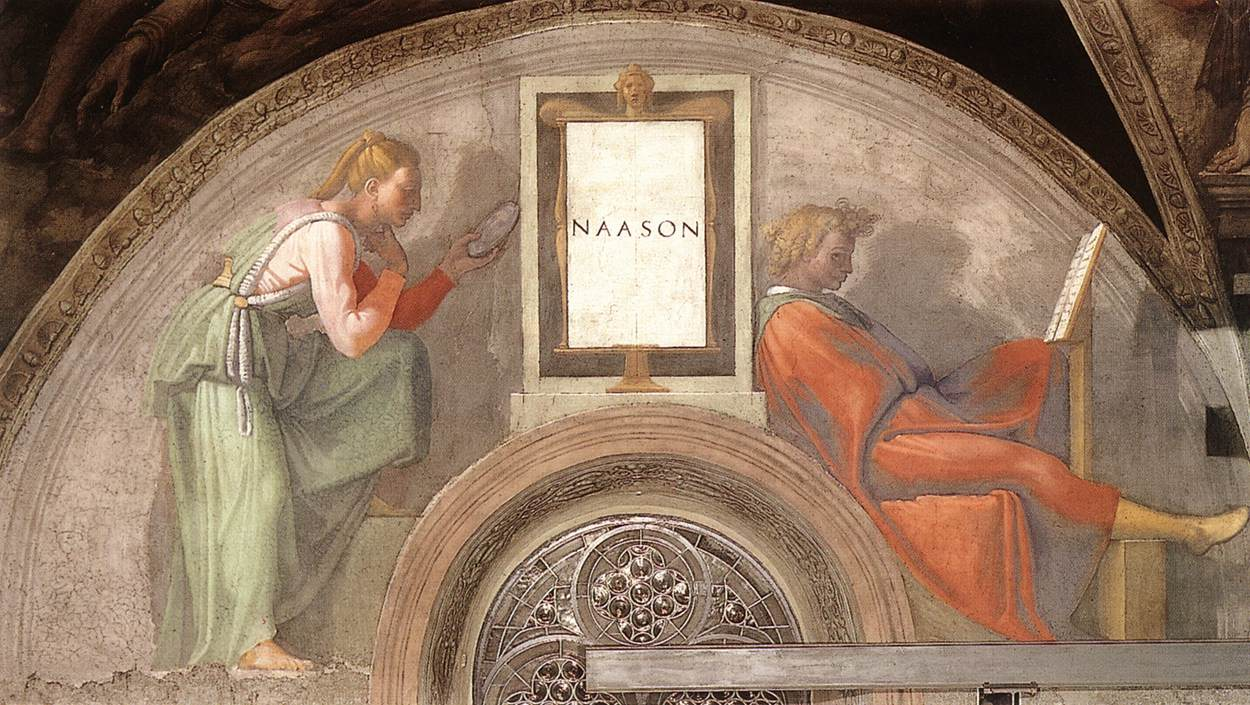
Lunette depicting Nahshon in the Sistine Chapel.

In the Hebrew Bible, Nahshon (Hebrew: נַחְשׁוֹן Naḥšon) was a tribal leader of the Judahites during the wilderness wanderings of the Book of Numbers. In the King James Version, the name is spelled Naashon, and is within modern Rabbinical contexts often transliterated as Nachshon.

According to a Jewish Midrash, he was the person who initiated the Hebrews' passage through the Red Sea, by walking in head-deep until the sea parted.

== In the Bible ==
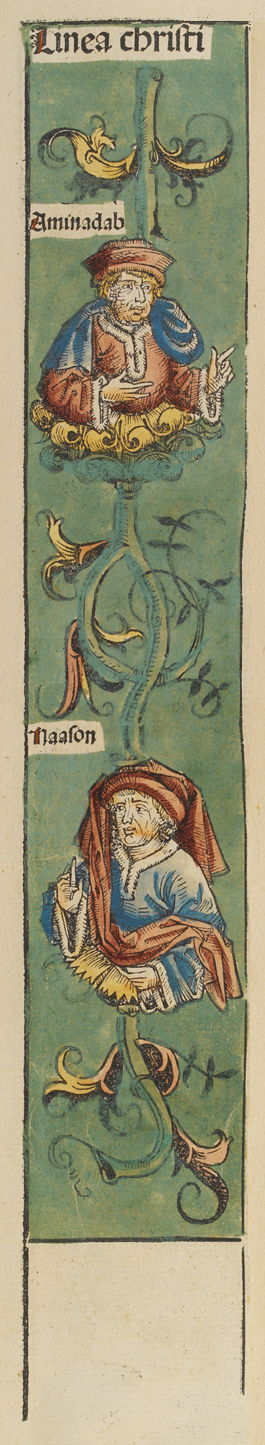
Nahshon and his father from the 1493 Nuremberg Chronicle.

According to the Hebrew Bible, Nahshon was a son of Amminadab, descendant in the fifth generation of Judah, and brother-in-law of Aaron. According to the Greek New Testament, he is also the father-in-law of Rahab. He was an Israelite and a Judahite, and a member of the Perezite and Hezronite clans, through his descent from Jacob, Judah, Perez, and Hezron, respectively.

According to the Book of Numbers, he was at least 20 years old during the census in the Sinai, during the Exodus. By the same account, those of the Israelites who were among the original number that had set out from Egypt, of whom Nahshon was one, did not survive the forty-year sojourn in the wilderness to enter the Promised Land of Canaan.

Nahshon was appointed by Moses, upon God's command, as prince and military commander of the Tribe of Judah and one of the leaders of the tribes of Israel. Although his tribe was fourth in the order of the Patriarchs, at the dedication of the Tabernacle he was the first to bring his dedicatory offering. His title or role is translated into Modern English variously in the New Revised Standard Version, as "leader" and census-taker, one of the "heads of their ancestral houses, the leaders of the tribes", "first .. over the whole company", and "prince of the sons of Judah".

Nahshon was, through Boaz, the direct male ancestor of David, and thus of Solomon and all of the kings of the Kingdom of Judah. He was exactly halfway in the direct male line between Judah and King David.

Nahshon is also mentioned in the New Testament in the genealogy of Jesus.

== In rabbinical literature ==
Owing to his direct descent from Judah and to his being the progenitor of so many kings, Nahshon is extolled by the rabbis as a most noble man. Nahshon's sister Elisheba married Aaron, and this is especially mentioned as a hint that one should take care to select a wife whose brothers are noble.

The Midrash relates that during the Exodus, when the Israelites reached the Red Sea, it did not automatically part. The Israelites stood at the banks of the sea and wailed with despair, but Nahshon entered the waters. Once he was up to his nose in the water, the sea parted. This is the origin of his name "Nahshol", that is, "stormy sea-waves". Nahshon was a model prince, and was called "king".

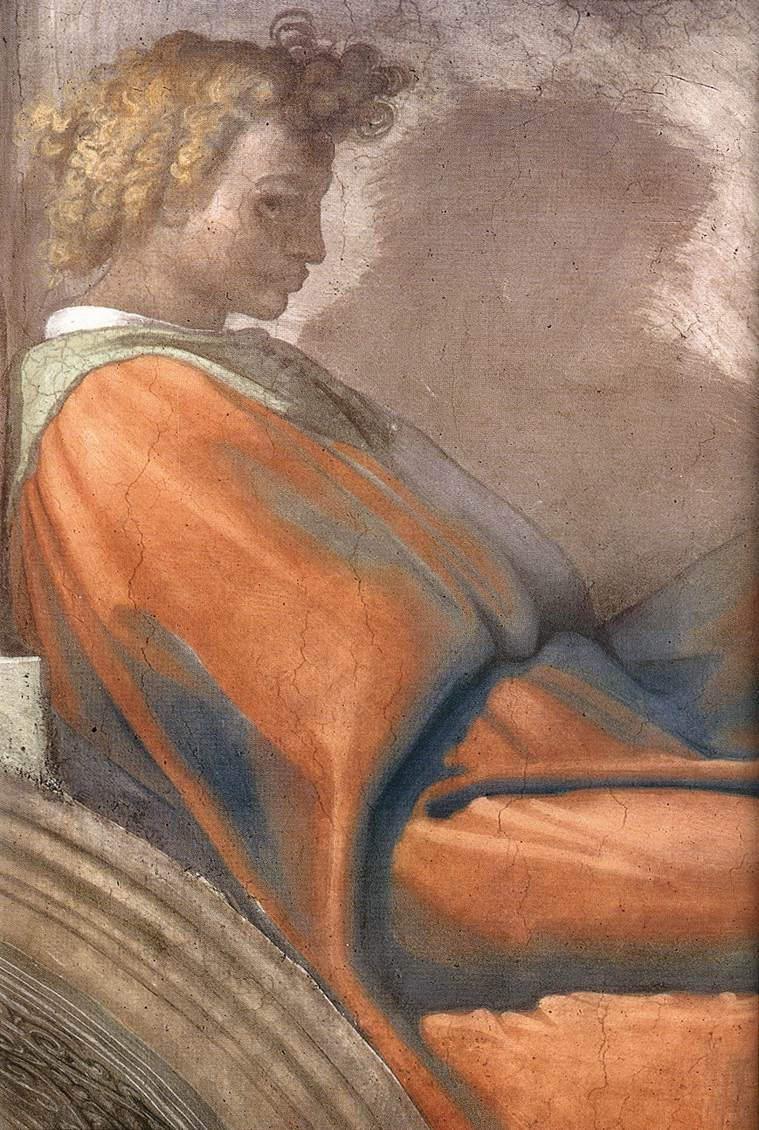
Michelangelo - Sistine Chapel lunette Naason

When the princes of the different tribes were required to bring their offerings, each on a separate day, Moses was embarrassed, not knowing who should be the first; but all Israel pointed at Nahshon, saying, "He sanctified the name of God by springing first into the Red Sea; he is worthy to bring down the Shekhinah; therefore he shall be the first to bring the offering."

The offering brought by Nahshon is pointed out as having been his own and not that of his tribe. In the account of the offering, the words Va'korbano ("and his sacrifice") and Etodim each have a ו (vav), while the same words in the accounts of the other princes' offerings have no ו (vav). This letter, the numerical value of which is six, indicates that Nahshon was the ancestor of six men — David, the Messiah, Daniel, Hananiah, Mishael, and Azariah — each of whom was distinguished for six praiseworthy qualities.

== In art ==
Nahshon is depicted as one of the ancestors of Christ in a lunette in the Sistine Chapel, where a youthful Nahshon is shown wearing a red robe and reading a book.

== See also ==
- Operation Nachshon
