= Eleazar =

High Priest of Israel and son of Aaron

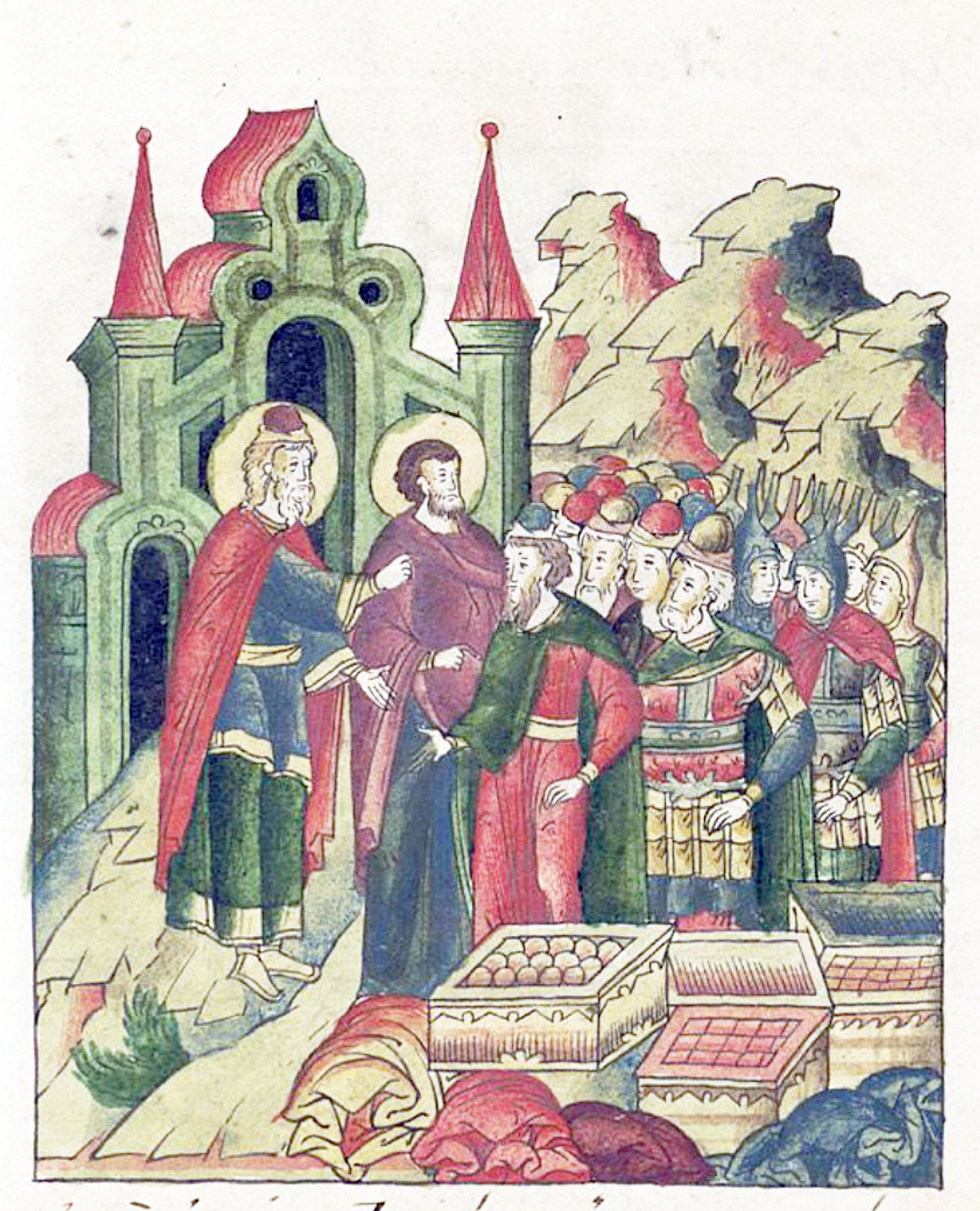
- Eleazar receiving trophies
- Died: Judea
- Venerated in: Catholic Church; Eastern Orthodox Church; Armenian Apostolic Church; Islam
- Feast: 2 September (Catholic Church, Eastern Orthodox Church); 30 July (Armenian Apostolic Church)

Eleazar (/ɛliˈeɪzər/; Hebrew: אֶלְעָזָר, Modern: ʾElʿazar, Tiberian: ʾElʿāzār, "El has helped") or Elazar was a priest in the Hebrew Bible, the second High Priest, succeeding his father Aaron after he died. He was a nephew of Moses.

== Biblical narrative ==
Eleazar played a number of roles during the course of the Exodus, from creating the plating for the altar from the firepans of Korah's assembly, to performing the ritual of the red heifer. After the death of his older brothers Nadab and Abihu, he and his younger brother Ithamar were put in charge of the sanctuary. His wife, a daughter of Putiel, bore him Phinehas, who would eventually succeed him as High Priest of Israel.

Leviticus 10:16–18 recounts Moses's anger towards Eleazar and Ithamar for not eating a sin offering inside the Tabernacle, which violated the regulations outlined for priests in earlier chapters of Leviticus.

During the Exodus, as the Israelites journeyed through the wilderness, Eleazar was in charge of carrying several important items: the oil for the lampstand, the sweet incense, the daily grain offering, and the anointing oil. Additionally, he oversaw the transportation of the Ark of the Covenant, the table for showbread, the altar, and other tabernacle fittings. These items were transported by the Kohathites of clan Levi. Following the rebellion against Moses's leadership recorded in Numbers 16, Eleazar was charged with taking the rebels' bronze censers and hammering them into a covering for the altar, acting as a reminder of Korah's failed rebellion and the restriction of the Jewish priesthood to the Aaronites.

On Mount Hor, he was clothed with the sacred vestments, which Moses had taken from Aaron and placed upon Eleazar as successor to the high priest's office before Aaron's death. Eleazar held the office of high priest for over twenty years. He took part with Moses in numbering the people and assisted at the inauguration of Joshua.

He assisted in the distribution of the land after the conquest. When he died, he "was buried at Gibeah, which had been allotted to his son Phinehas in the hill country of Ephraim". The Hill of Phinehas related in the Hebrew Bible is associated with the location of the village of Awarta in the Samarian section of the current day West Bank.

The high priesthood remained in the family of Eleazar until the time of Eli, into whose family it passed. Eli was a descendant of Ithamar, Eleazar's brother. The high priesthood was restored to the family of Eleazar—in the person of Zadok—after Abiathar was cast out by Solomon.

According to Jewish tradition, Eleazar was buried in Awarta.

== Commemorations ==
Eleazar is commemorated as a saint in the Eastern Orthodox Church and Roman Catholic Church on September 2, and as one of the Holy Forefathers in the Calendar of Saints of the Armenian Apostolic Church on July 30.

== Other biblical figures named Eleazar ==
Five other men named Eleazar are briefly mentioned in the Hebrew Bible:

- Eleazar, son of Abinadab, who was entrusted as a keeper of the Ark of the Covenant
- Eleazar (son of Dodai), one of King David's warriors
- Eleazar, son of Pinhas, one of those in charge of the sacred vessels brought back to Jerusalem after the Babylonian Exile.
- Eleazar, called Avaran who slays a battle elephant in I Maccabees.
- Eleazar, the Hebrew scribe whose martyrdom under Antiochus IV Epiphanes was recounted in II Maccabees.

In the Gospel of Matthew, another Eleazar, the son of Eliud, is listed in the genealogy of Jesus as the great-grandfather of Joseph, husband of Mary.

== Patrilineal ancestry ==
Patrilineal descent
1. Abraham
2. Isaac
3. Jacob
4. Levi
5. Kehath
6. Amram
7. Aaron

Israelite religious titles
Preceded by Aaron	High Priest of Israel; Years unknown	Succeeded by Phinehas
