= Odala =

- Municipality type D (Village council)

Arabic transcription(s)
  - Arabic: اودلة
  - Latin: Odala (official); Udala (unofficial)
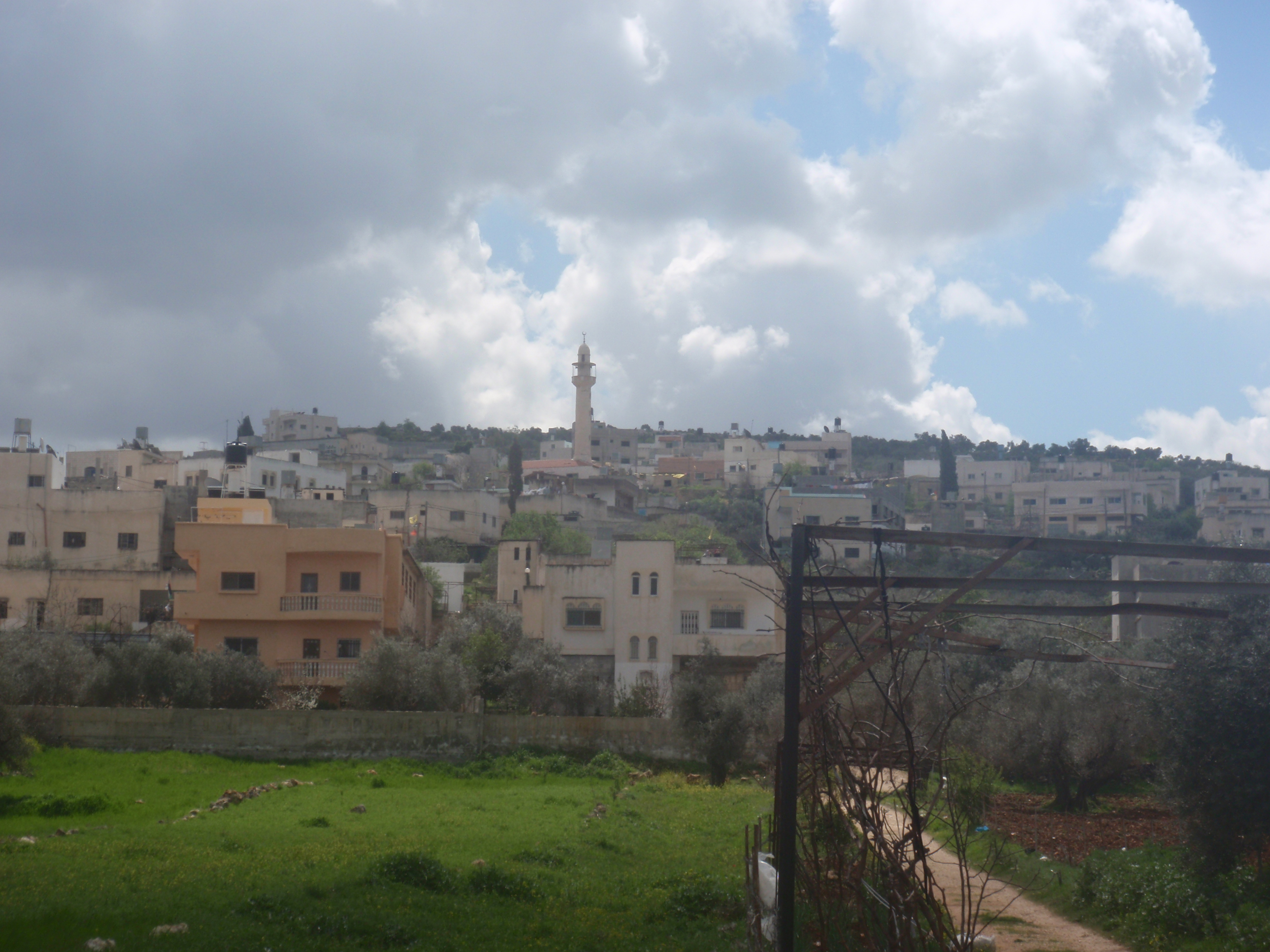
- Odala in 2011

- Location of Odala within Palestine
- Coordinates: 32°09′12″N 35°16′35″E
- Palestine grid: 176/173
- State: State of Palestine
- Governorate: Nablus

Government
  - Type: Village council

Population (2017)
  - Total: 1,566
- Name meaning: from personal name

Odala (Arabic: اودلة) is a Palestinian town in the Nablus Governorate in northern West Bank, located south of Nablus. According to the Palestinian Central Bureau of Statistics (PCBS), the town had a population of 1,566 inhabitants in 2017.

== Location ==
Odala is located 7.6 kilometers (4.7 mi) south of Nablus. It is bordered by Huwara to the west, Beita to the south and east, and ‘Awarta to the east and north.

== History ==
Shards from Hellenistic, Roman, Byzantine, Crusader, Ayyubid and Mamluk eras have been found here.

=== Ottoman era ===
Shards from the early Ottoman era have been found here. In 1596 the village appeared in Ottoman tax registers under the name of ‘’Udala’’, and as being in the nahiya of Jabal Qubal in the liwa of Nablus. It had a population of 18 households and 2 bachelors, all Muslim. They paid a fixed tax-rate of 33,3 % on agricultural products, including wheat, barley, summer crops, olive trees, goats and beehives, in addition to occasional revenues and a press for olive oil or syrup; a total of 3,000 akçe. One quarter of the revenue went to a Waqf.

In 1838, Haudela was noted as a village in the District of El-Beitawy, east of Nablus.

In 1870 Victor Guérin noted it as a village surrounded by olive and fig trees.

In 1882, the PEF's Survey of Western Palestine described Audelah as a small hamlet, on the low hills east of the Mukhnah plain.

=== British Mandate era ===
In the 1922 census of Palestine, conducted by the British Mandate authorities, Audala had a population of 64 Muslims, increasing in the 1931 census to 73 Muslim, in 17 houses.

In the 1945 statistics Odala together with Awarta had a population of 1,470, all Muslims, with 16,106 dunams of land, according to an official land and population survey. Of this, 30 dunams were plantations and irrigable land, 9,406 used for cereals, while 130 dunams were built-up land.

=== Jordanian era ===
In the wake of the 1948 Arab–Israeli War, and after the 1949 Armistice Agreements, Odala came under Jordanian rule.

The Jordanian census of 1961 found 179 inhabitants.

=== 1967-present ===
Since the Six-Day War in 1967, Odala has been under Israeli occupation.

After the 1995 accords, 89% of the village land is defined as Area B land, while the remaining 11% is defined as Area C.

In May, 2021, the Israeli army shot and killed 16 year old Said Yousef Mohammad Odeh from Odala. There were "confrontations" at the entrance at Odala at the time, but his family stated that the 10-grader was not involved, while the Israeli army stated that he was. The Defence for Children International - Palestine, stated: "Israeli forces reportedly confronted Palestinian youth at the village entrance prior to the shooting. Saeed was not involved in the confrontations at the time he was shot, according to information collected by our team.

"Israeli forces deployed in a nearby olive grove fired live ammunition at Saeed as he approached the village entrance. He sustained at least two gunshot wounds: in the back near his right shoulder and pelvis. Both bullets exited from the front." His cousin was shot at the same time, but survived.

== Bibliography ==
- Barron, J.B., ed. (1923). Palestine: Report and General Abstracts of the Census of 1922. Government of Palestine.
- Conder, C.R.; Kitchener, H.H. (1882). The Survey of Western Palestine: Memoirs of the Topography, Orography, Hydrography, and Archaeology. Vol. 2. London: Committee of the Palestine Exploration Fund.
- Finkelstein, I.; Lederman, Zvi, eds. (1997). Highlands of many cultures. Tel Aviv: Institute of Archaeology of Tel Aviv University Publications Section. ISBN 965-440-007-3.
- Government of Jordan, Department of Statistics (1964). First Census of Population and Housing. Volume I: Final Tables; General Characteristics of the Population (PDF).
- Government of Palestine, Department of Statistics (1945). Village Statistics, April, 1945.
- Guérin, V. (1874). Description Géographique Historique et Archéologique de la Palestine (in French). Vol. 2: Samarie, pt. 1. Paris: L'Imprimerie Nationale.
- Hadawi, S. (1970). Village Statistics of 1945: A Classification of Land and Area ownership in Palestine. Palestine Liberation Organization Research Center.
- Hütteroth, W.-D.; Abdulfattah, K. (1977). Historical Geography of Palestine, Transjordan and Southern Syria in the Late 16th Century. Erlanger Geographische Arbeiten, Sonderband 5. Erlangen, Germany: Vorstand der Fränkischen Geographischen Gesellschaft. ISBN 3-920405-41-2.
- Mills, E., ed. (1932). Census of Palestine 1931. Population of Villages, Towns and Administrative Areas. Jerusalem: Government of Palestine.
- Palmer, E.H. (1881). The Survey of Western Palestine: Arabic and English Name Lists Collected During the Survey by Lieutenants Conder and Kitchener, R. E. Transliterated and Explained by E.H. Palmer. Committee of the Palestine Exploration Fund.
- Robinson, E.; Smith, E. (1841). Biblical Researches in Palestine, Mount Sinai and Arabia Petraea: A Journal of Travels in the year 1838. Vol. 3. Boston: Crocker & Brewster.
