= Ithamar =

High Priest of Israel; son of Aaron

In the Bible, Ithamar (Hebrew: אִיתָמָר, romanized: ʾĪṯāmār, lit. 'palm tree isle') was the fourth (and the youngest) son of Aaron the High Priest. Following the construction of the Tabernacle, he was responsible for recording an inventory to ensure that the constructed Tabernacle and its contents conformed to the vision given by God to Moses on Mount Sinai.

== Kohen ==
After the death of his two eldest brothers, Nadab and Abihu, when God punished them for performing an unauthorized incense offering, Ithamar served as a kohen (priest) along with his elder brother, Eleazar. Ithamar and Eleazar are regarded as the direct male ancestors of all Kohanim.

Leviticus 10:16–18 records an incident when Moses was angry with Eleazar and Ithamar for failing to eat a sin offering inside the Tabernacle following the regulations set out in the preceding chapters of Leviticus regarding the entitlement of the priests to a share of the offerings they made on behalf of the Israelite people.

During the travels of the Israelites in the Wilderness of Sin, Ithamar was responsible for the work of the sons of Gershon and Merari, the carriers of the Tabernacle fittings and structures, while Eleazar was responsible for the work of the sons of Kohath, who carried the cult objects (the ark, the altar and the menorah).

He was also in charge of the work of the Levites in general.

== Samaritan accounts ==
According to Samaritan sources, a civil war broke out between the sons of Ithamar (Eli) and the sons of Phinehas, which resulted in the division of those who followed Eli and those who followed High Priest Uzzi ben Bukki at Mount Gerizim Bethel (a third group followed neither). The line of the sons of Phineas died out in 1624 with the death of the 112th High Priest Shlomyah ben Pinhas, at which time the priesthood was transferred to the sons of Ithamar.

== Burial site ==
The burial site of Ithamar is associated with the Hill of Phinehas recorded in the Bible and believed to be located in the village of Awarta in the West Bank. Due to the fact that the purported land is in Palestine, the Israel Defense Forces limit visits by Jews to one annual night close to 5 Shevat on the Hebrew calendar (around January or February).

== See also ==
- Levite
