= Awarta =

- Municipality type C

Arabic transcription(s)
  - Arabic: عورتا
  - Latin: Aworta (official)
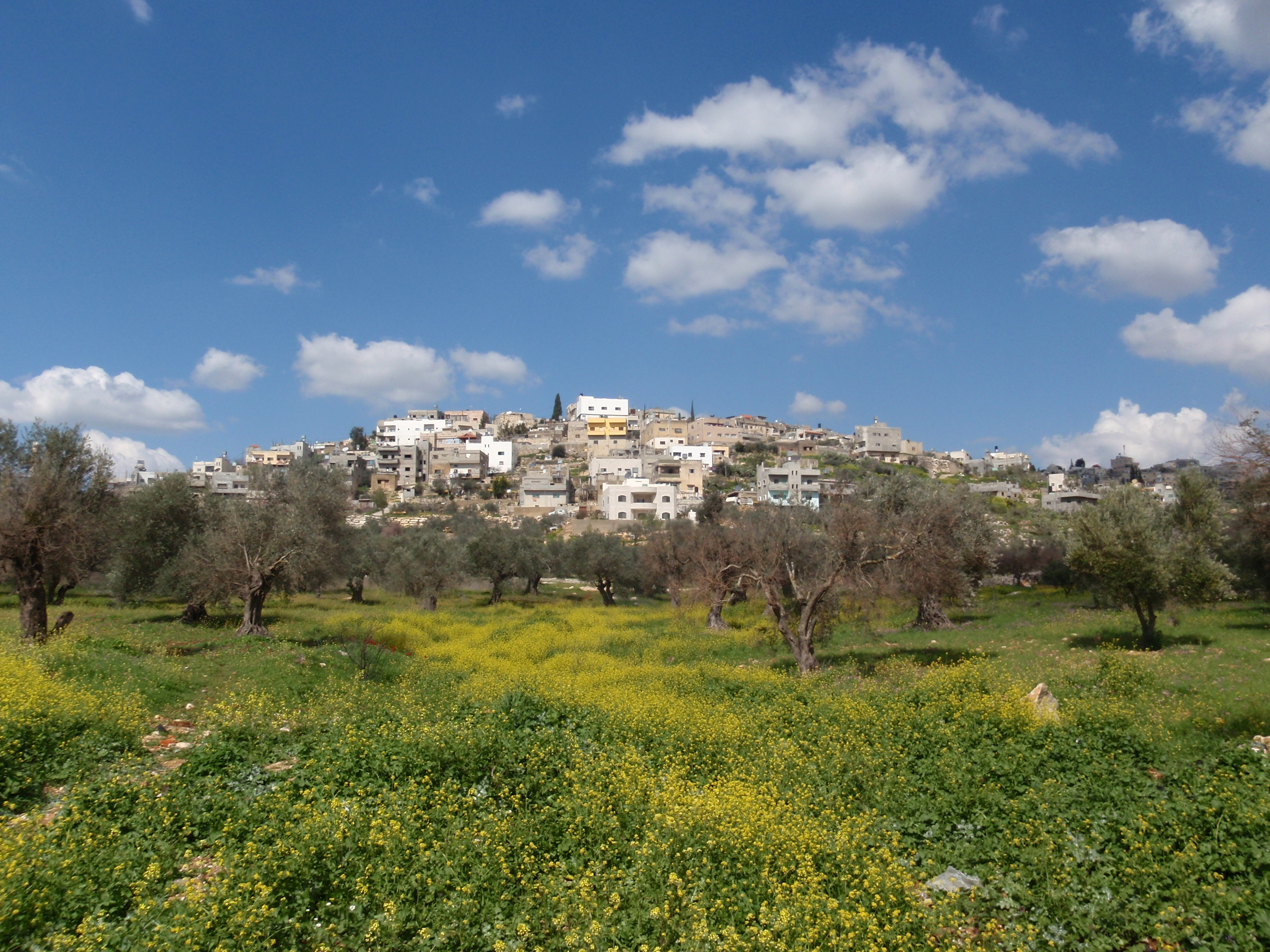
- Awarta, 2011

- Location of Awarta within Palestine
- Coordinates: 32°09′41″N 35°17′11″E
- Palestine grid: 177/174
- State: State of Palestine
- Governorate: Nablus

Government
  - Type: Municipality

Area
  - Total: 0.5 km^{2} (0.19 sq mi)

Population (2017)
  - Total: 7,054
  - Density: 14,000/km^{2} (37,000/sq mi)

Awarta (Arabic: عورتا) is a Palestinian town located 8 kilometers (5.0 mi) southeast of Nablus, in the northern West Bank. According to the Palestinian Central Bureau of Statistics, the town had a population of 7,054 inhabitants in 2017. Awarta's built-up area consists of 540 dunams (0.54 km^{2}; 0.21 sq mi) and it is governed by a village council.

Awarta was an important Samaritan center between the 4th and the 12th century and housed one of their major synagogues. It is home to several holy sites revered by Samaritans, Jews and Muslims, the most well-known of which is the traditional tomb of Phinehas, grandson of Aaron.

== Etymology ==
According to Palestinian historian Mustafa Dabbagh, the name derives from the Syriac word 'awra, meaning "windowless" or "hidden". According to E. H. Palmer, "Awarta" is a personal name or unknown word. In Samaritan text, the town was called "Caphar Abearthah". An earlier Arabic name for the village was "'Awert".

== History ==
Awarta has been inhabited in the First Temple period, Byzantine and Early Islamic period, and again during Ottoman rule. Between the 4th and 12th centuries, the town was an important Samaritan center, being the location of one of their main synagogues. According to Ben-Zvi, the last Samaritan family, who are of priestly Cohen lineage from the tribe of Levi, left Awarta during the 17th century. He also mentions that the Samaritans of his time (1920s) believed that the majority of the village's residents or all of them are of Samaritan ancestry but were forced to convert to Islam.

Samaritan author Benyamim Tsedaka lists seven Samaritan families, H'Akkaba, Qaahlaa, Qinaa, Libi, Ma'or, Phinass and Roomem, who resided in Awarta before their destruction or conversion.

The Hill of Phinehas related in the Bible is associated with the location of the town of Awarta. Three large monuments in the town are attributed to the priestly family of Aaron. According to tradition, they are the burial sites of his sons Ithamar and Eleazar. His grandson Phinehas is believed to be buried at the site alongside his son Abishua — the latter is especially revered by the Samaritans, who believe that he wrote the Torah. The seventy Elders are believed to be buried in a cave near Phinehas' tomb. On the western side of Awarta lies the tomb Muslims attribute to Nabi Uzeir, Ezra the scribe.

Arab geographer Yaqut al-Hamawi records in 1226, while Awarta was under Ayyubid rule, that it was a "village or small town, on the road from Nablus to Jerusalem. According to the Samaritan Chronicle, in Kefr Ghuweirah (now called Awarta) is found the tomb of Yusha (Joshua) ibn Nun. Mufaddal, the son of Aaron's uncle, is also said to be buried here. These lie in a cave, where the seventy prophets are also buried." Conder and Kitchener, citing another Samaritan tradition, say rather that it was Eleazer the priest who was buried a "little way west of Awarta (at al 'Azeir)," while Joshua bin Nun was buried at Kefr Haris.

=== Ottoman era ===
Awarta was incorporated into the Ottoman Empire in 1517 with all of Palestine, and in 1596 it appeared in the tax registers as being in the Nahiya of Jabal Qubal, part of Nablus Sanjak. It had a population of 50 households, all Muslim. The villagers paid a fixed tax rate of 33.3% on wheat, barley, summer crops, olive trees, goats and/or beehives, in addition to for a press for olives or grapes and occasional revenues; a total of 11,194 akçe.

The site was visited in the 17th-century CE by Ottoman explorer, Evliya Çelebi. In his detailed travelogue, he wrote that Awarta was situated between Balāṭa and Ḥuwwāra as one traveled the country from north to south. In this place, he notes, is located the “house of el-‘Uzair,” erroneously translated later as the ‘house of Ezra,’ but actually meaning the “tomb of Eleazar, the son of Aaron,” and which at that time had already been converted into a mosque.

In 1838, Edward Robinson noted the village besides Rujeib and Odela, part of the el-Beitawy district, east of Nablus.

In 1870 Victor Guérin visited the village, and noted that in the upper part there was a mosque, called Djama Mansour, containing a gigantic whitewashed tomb. In 1882, the PEF's Survey of Western Palestine described it as "a village, on the slopes east of the plain, with springs to the east, and olive-groves. It is built of adobe and stone, and is of moderate size."

=== British Mandate era ===
In the 1922 census of Palestine conducted by the British Mandate authorities, Awarta had a population of 938 Muslims, increasing at the time of the 1931 census to 1,019, still all Muslim, in 257 houses.

In the 1945 statistics Awarta together with Odala had a population of 1,470, all Muslims, with 16,106 dunams of land, according to an official land and population survey. Of this, 30 dunams were plantations and irrigable land, 9,406 used for cereals, while 132 dunams were built-up (urban) land.

=== Jordanian era ===
In the wake of the 1948 Arab–Israeli War, and after the 1949 Armistice Agreements, Awarta came under Jordanian rule. It was annexed by Jordan in 1950.

In 1961, the population of Awarta was 2,069.

=== 1967, aftermath ===
Since the Six-Day War in 1967, Awarta has been under Israeli occupation. The Palestinian National Authority agreed to ensure free access to these sites as specified in the 1995 Interim Agreement on the West Bank and the Gaza Strip.

According to Applied Research Institute–Jerusalem, much of the land of Awarta has been confiscated by the Israelis, including 2,450 dunums of land which was used for construction of the Israeli settlement of Itamar.

There are frequent reports of violence by Israeli settlers towards Palestinian farmers during the annual olive harvest. However, from 2007, when a group of Israeli activists — Rabbis for Human Rights — agreed to protect the farmers during the harvest, attacks temporarily came to an end. According to Ghassan Daghlas, who monitors West Bank settlements, on 10 July 2013 Israelis from the Itamar settlement used chainsaws to cut down thousands of the villagers' olive trees in a 600-dunam olive grove maintained by 25 Awarta families in an area north of their town. Sami, Iyad N’am ‘Awwad, a local teacher, stated that the affected area has been isolated from the rest of the village by the erection of two Itamar security fences.

In 2010, two cousins from Awarta, Salah Qawariq, 18, and Muhammad Qawariq, 19, were killed by an Israeli (IDF) soldier who emptied his magazine, shooting them 29 times. The autopsies reveal that both had been shot at close range. Palestinian sources claim the teenagers were executed by Israeli soldiers, while out working their land. Israeli accounts varied over time: they were on their land when Avri Ran noted them on the property and forced them to sit down, called up a settlement security coordinator, who in turn called the IDF in. After two hours of communications between the soldiers and headquarters, the men were shot: on interrogation the other soldiers said they had not witnessed the shooting. The IDF announced that a terrorist attempt involving an attempt to attack soldiers with a pitchfork had been foiled. This was subsequently revised to an assault with a bottle and a syringe. It emerged later that they had not got IDF clearance to work their land.

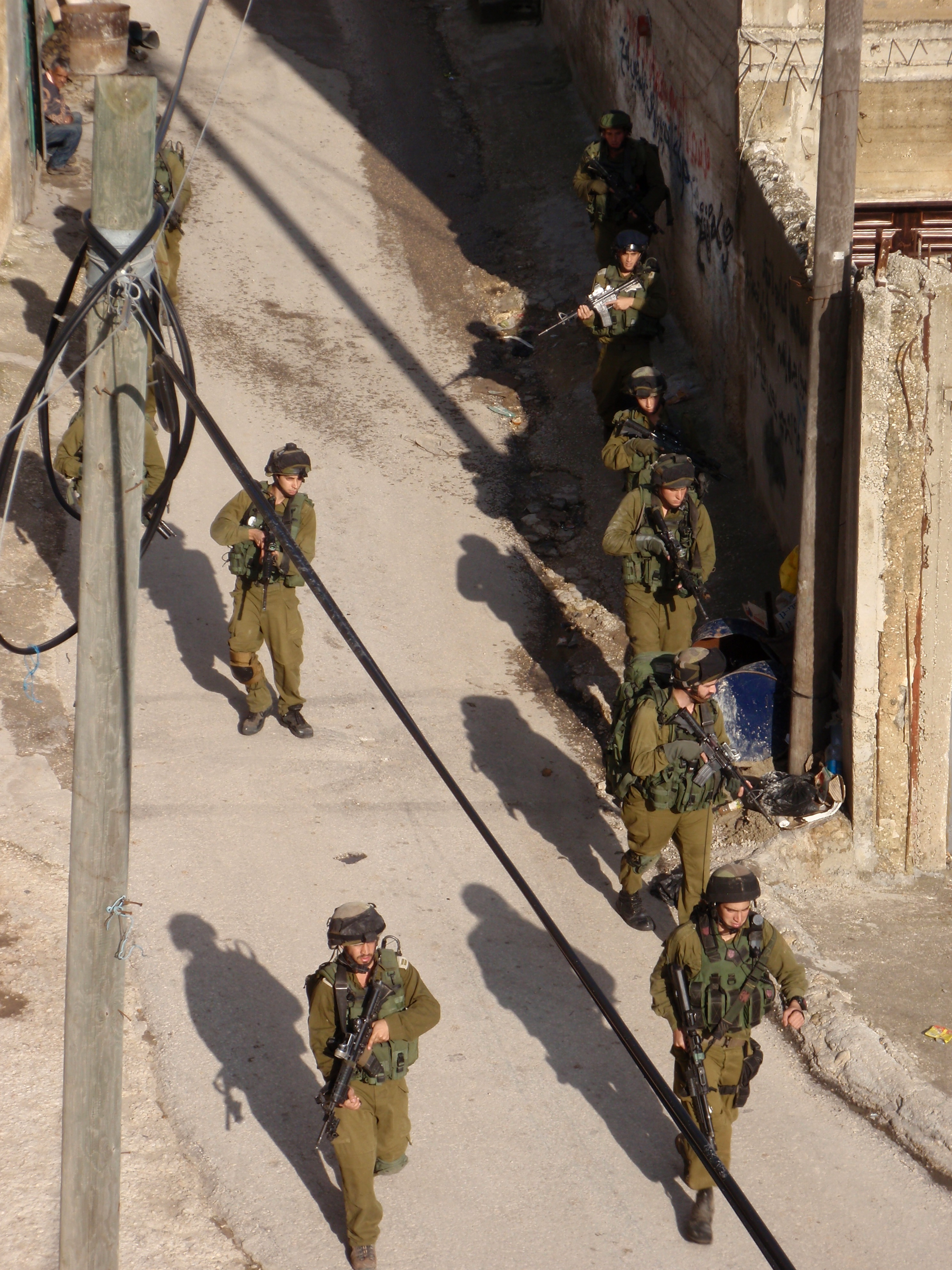
Israeli soldiers patrolling Awarta on the day after the Itamar attack

Awarta made international headlines after the Itamar attack of 11 March 2011, when five members of the same family were killed in the nearby Israeli settlement of Itamar. Awarta was subsequently declared a closed military zone, due to suspicions that the perpetrators were residents of the village. According to the Israeli newspaper Haaretz, Palestinian sources reported that Israeli military forces took all of Awarta's men in for questioning, including two officers of the Palestinian security forces, making "wholesale arrests". As a reaction to the attack, masked Israeli settlers infiltrated the village and threw stones at homes, before being dispersed by the Israel Defense Forces. Two young Awarta residents, Hakim Maazan Niad Awad and Amjad Mahmud Fauzi Awad were arrested on 5 and 10 April 2011 and confessed to the killings. The village council chief condemned the murder, however he voiced doubts over the Israeli findings and claimed that the two suspects confessed under duress. The two were sentenced to five consecutive life sentences and another five and seven years respectively in prison.

== Economy ==
Awarta has about sixty businesses, most of them active in the fields of trade and small recycling industries. Approximately 40% of the labor force used to work in Israel before the Second Intifada, while 15% worked in the agriculture and animal husbandry sectors. The rate of unemployment is almost 35%. The town does not have a water or sewage utility system. There is a public well that is under the control of the Nablus Municipality. Road networks have been hampered by the IDF due to the area being a militant stronghold. Awarta has three schools - a secondary school for boys, a secondary school for girls and a coeducational primary school.

== Bibliography ==
- Barron, J.B., ed. (1923). Palestine: Report and General Abstracts of the Census of 1922. Government of Palestine.
- Conder, C.R.; Kitchener, H.H. (1882). The Survey of Western Palestine: Memoirs of the Topography, Orography, Hydrography, and Archaeology. Vol. 2. London: Committee of the Palestine Exploration Fund. (pp. 219)
- Conder, C.R. (1876). "Samarian Topography". Quarterly Statement - Palestine Exploration Fund. 8: 182–197.
- Finkelstein, I.; Lederman, Zvi, eds. (1997). Highlands of many cultures. Tel Aviv: Institute of Archaeology of Tel Aviv University Publications Section. ISBN 965-440-007-3. (p. 706)
- Government of Jordan, Department of Statistics (1964). First Census of Population and Housing. Volume I: Final Tables; General Characteristics of the Population (PDF).
- Government of Palestine, Department of Statistics (1945). Village Statistics, April, 1945.
- Guérin, V. (1874). Description Géographique Historique et Archéologique de la Palestine (in French). Vol. 2: Samarie, pt. 1. Paris: L'Imprimerie Nationale.
- Hadawi, S. (1970). Village Statistics of 1945: A Classification of Land and Area ownership in Palestine. Palestine Liberation Organization Research Center.
- Hütteroth, W.-D.; Abdulfattah, K. (1977). Historical Geography of Palestine, Transjordan and Southern Syria in the Late 16th Century. Erlanger Geographische Arbeiten, Sonderband 5. Erlangen, Germany: Vorstand der Fränkischen Geographischen Gesellschaft. ISBN 3-920405-41-2.
- Le Strange, G. (1890). Palestine Under the Moslems: A Description of Syria and the Holy Land from A.D. 650 to 1500. Committee of the Palestine Exploration Fund.
- Mills, E., ed. (1932). Census of Palestine 1931. Population of Villages, Towns and Administrative Areas. Jerusalem: Government of Palestine.
- Palmer, E.H. (1881). The Survey of Western Palestine: Arabic and English Name Lists Collected During the Survey by Lieutenants Conder and Kitchener, R. E. Transliterated and Explained by E.H. Palmer. Committee of the Palestine Exploration Fund.
- Robinson, E.; Smith, E. (1841). Biblical Researches in Palestine, Mount Sinai and Arabia Petraea: A Journal of Travels in the year 1838. Vol. 3. Boston: Crocker & Brewster.
