= December 12 (Eastern Orthodox liturgics) =

Day in the Eastern Orthodox liturgical calendar

Eastern Orthodox liturgical calendar
December 11	December 12	December 13
December 12 O.S. ≍ December 25 N.S. December 12 N.S ≍ November 29 O.S.

An Eastern Orthodox cross

December 12 in Eastern Orthodox liturgical calendars is a feast day and a day of commemoration of saints and martyrs. Although some Orthodox churches use the Revised Julian Calendar and others use the traditional Julian calendar, the fixed commemorations for their respective December 12 are broadly the same, no matter which calendar is used. (Note: Despite the dates being the same, the days to which they refer typically differ by 13 days. The notation Old Style or O.S. is sometimes used to indicate a date in the traditional Julian Calendar (the "Old Calendar"). The notation New Style or N.S. indicates a date in the Revised Julian calendar (the "New Calendar").)

== Saints ==
- Hieromartyr Alexander, Archbishop of Jerusalem (250-251)
- Martyr Aitherius (Aetherius), under Maximian, tortured and beheaded for refusing to sacrifice to idols (c. 286-305) (Note: His memory is recorded in Parisian Codex 1611.)
- Saint Spyridon the Wonderworker, Bishop of Tremithus (348)
- Venerable Amonathus, Monk of Pelusium.
- Venerable Anthus, Monk of Palestine.
- Saint Euphemiane. (Note: She in unknown in the Synaxaria. However her memory is recorded in the Jerusalemitic Canonarion pg.120, together with Saint Phoebe, another unknown Saint.)
- Martyr John, Abbot of the Zedazeni Monastery, Georgia (9th century) (Note: The life of the holy martyr John, Abbot of Zedazeni Monastery, has not been preserved, but the list recalling “the names of the holy fathers who reposed at Zedazeni Monastery after John of Zedazeni,” which was compiled by Catholicos Arsenius II (955-80), tells us that Abbot John was “murdered at Zedazeni by Muslims.” St. John was martyred in the 9th century.) (see also: May 7)

== Pre-Schism Western saints ==
- Martyr Synesius (Synetus) of Rome, a Reader, tortured and beheaded for refusing to sacrifice to idols (270-275)
- Martyrs Maxentius, Constantius, Crescentius, Justinus and their Companions, martyrs in Trier in Germany in the reign of Diocletian, under the governor Rictiovarus (c. 287)
- Saint Abra of Poitiers, daughter of Saint Hilary of Poitiers in France (c. 360) (Note: Following the advice of her father St. Hilary, she consecrated herself to God as a nun but reposed at the age of eighteen.)
- Saint Corentin (Corentinus), first Bishop of Quimper in Brittany, he had lived as a hermit at Plomodiern (490)
- Saint Finian of Clonard and Skellig Michael, teacher of Ireland and one of the fathers of Irish monasticism (549) (Note: "This illustrious Saint of Ireland received his first education in learning and piety from the Bishop St. Fortchern and the Abbot St. Cayman; but he passed over to Wales, and spent many years with St. David at Minevia, blessing that land with the example of his holy life. He was advanced in age when he returned to Ireland, though his zeal for the service of God was in no way diminished. The great work of St. Finian was the foundation of the celebrated School of Clonard, in Westmeath, in which a multitude of eminent servants of God were educated in piety and human learning.")
- Saint Columba of Terryglass (Columba of Tyrdaglas), born in Leinster in Ireland, he was a disciple of Saint Finian and Abbot of Tyrdaglas in Munster (552) (see also: December 13)
- Saint Gregory of Terracina, a disciple of Saint Benedict, and with his brother Saint Speciosus, a monk at Terracina in Italy (c. 570)
- Saint Cormac (Cormac mac Eogain), an Abbot in Ireland and friend of Saint Columba (6th century)
- Saint Colman of Glendalough in Ireland, Abbot (659)
- Saint Agatha, nun at Wimborne in Dorset in England and a disciple of Saint Lioba, she went to Germany to help Saint Boniface in his missionary work (c. 790)

== Post-Schism Orthodox saints ==
- Saint John, Metropolitan of Zichnon (Zichne), founder of the Monastery of the Forerunner on Mt. Menikion (north-east of Serres) (1333)
- Venerable Therapon (Therapontus), Abbot of Monza Monastery (1597)
- Saint Mardarije Uskoković of Libertyville, Illinois, Enlightener and Apostle of the Church in America (1935) (Note: Canonized in 2015.) (see also: November 29 - O.S.)

== Other commemorations ==
- Sunday of the Holy Forefathers of Jesus Christ (December 11–17)
- Synaxis of the First Martyrs of the American land:

- Hieromartyr Juvenaly (Juvenal) of Alaska, Protomartyr of America (1796)
- Martyr Peter (Cungagnaq) the Aleut, tortured and slain by Franciscan friars at San Francisco, California (c. 1815)
- Hieromartyr Anatole Kamensky of Irkutsk (1925) (Note: Archbishop Anatole was glorified as a Russian New-Martyr on the calendars of the Moscow Patriarchate and the Russian Church Abroad and is known as the New Hieromartyr Anatole (Kamensky), Archbishop of Irkutsk. The time and place of Abp. Anatole's death is uncertain. His repose is dated variously as in November 1924 or on September 20, 1925 as well as September 20, 1920 and January 24, 1921. In one account of his death he is recorded as dying quietly in Omsk. He is commemorated on the following feast days: New Martyrs and Confessors of Russia - (the Sunday nearest January 25 / February 7); Synaxis of the New-Martyrs of the American Land - (December 12 / 25).) (Note: See also: (in Russian) Анатолий (Каменский). Википедии. (Russian Wikipedia).)
- Hieromartyr Seraphim Samoilovich of Uglich (1937) (Note: See also: (in Russian) Серафим (Самойлович). Википедии. (Russian Wikipedia).)
- Hieromartyr John Kochurov of Chicago, Priest, slain in Russia (1917)
- Hieromartyr Alexander Hotovitzky of New York, Priest, slain in Russia (1937)

- Repose of Flegont Ostrovsky, Stylite of Kimlyai, Mordovia (1870) (Note: Desert-dweller Flegont of Moksha River, Penza.)

== Icon gallery ==
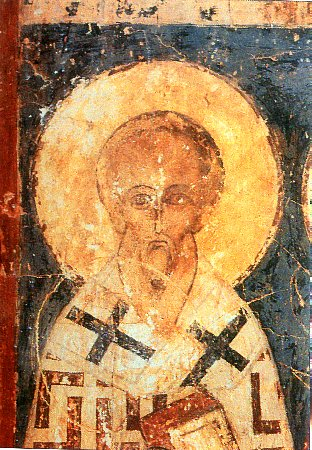
Hieromartyr Alexander of Jerusalem, Bishop of Jerusalem.

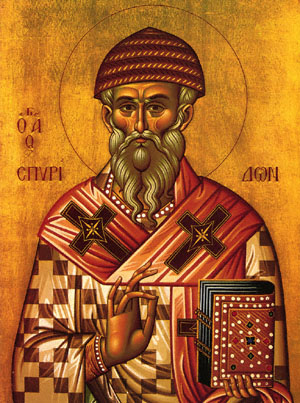
St. Spyridon the Wonderworker, of Tremithus.

St. Spyridon the Wonderworker, of Tremithus.
(Menologion of Basil II, 10th century).

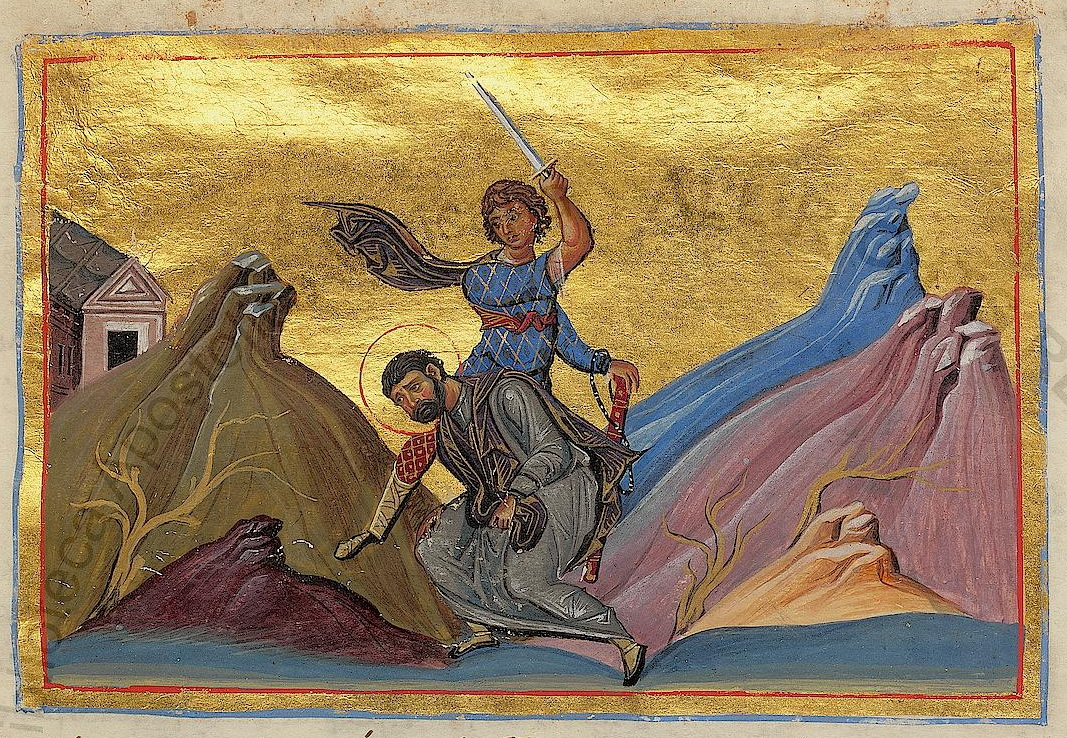
Martyr Synesius (Synetus) of Rome.
(Menologion of Basil II, 10th century).

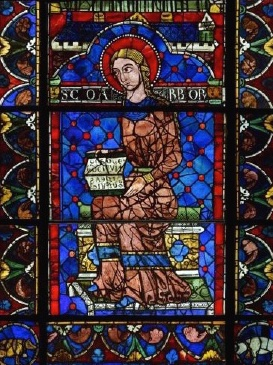
St. Abra of Poitiers.

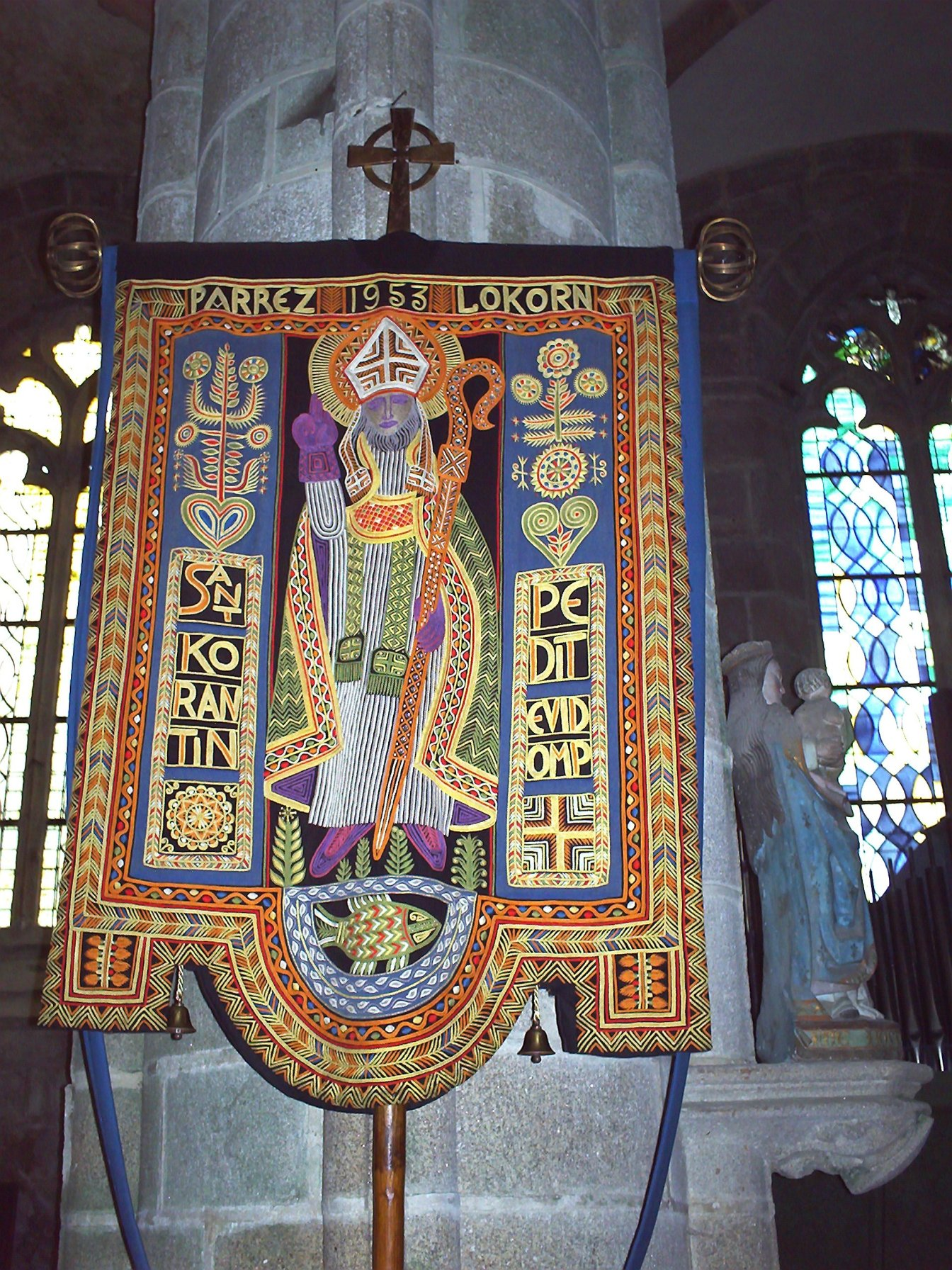
Labarum of St. Corentin of Quimper, in the parish church of Locronan, Brittany.

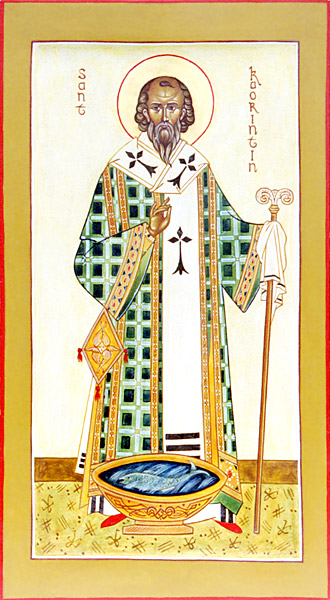
St. Corentin of Quimper.

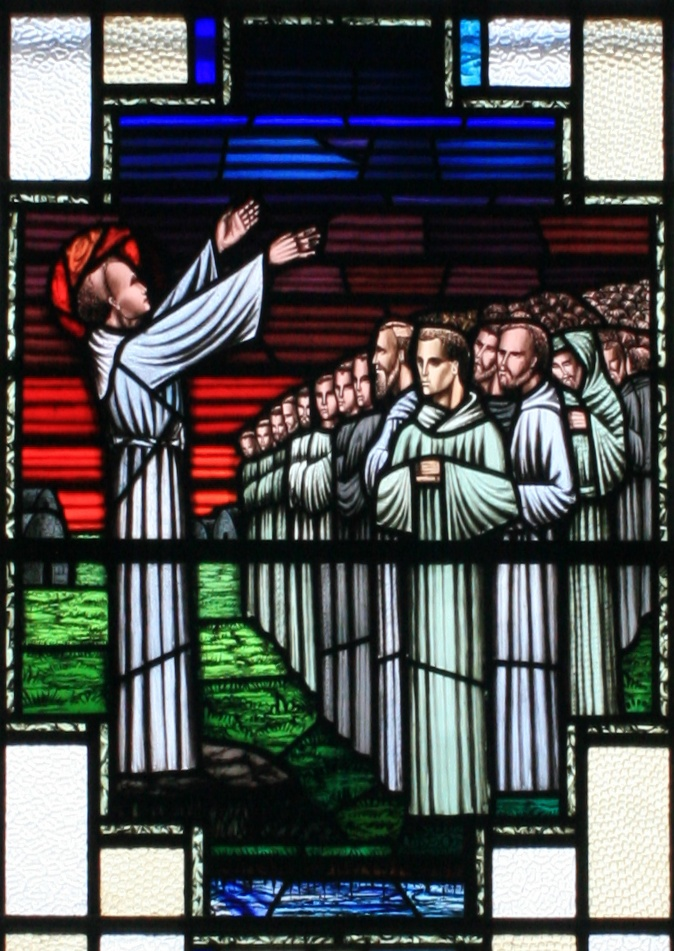
Saint Finnian of Clonard preaches to his monks at Clonard. (Stained glass, 1957).

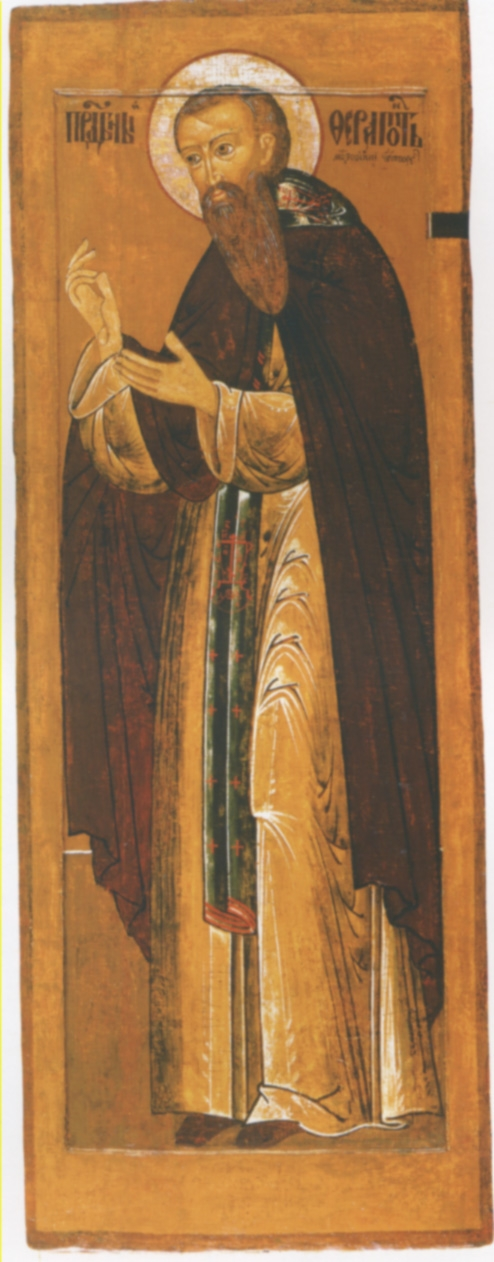
Venerable Therapon, Abbot of Monza Monastery.

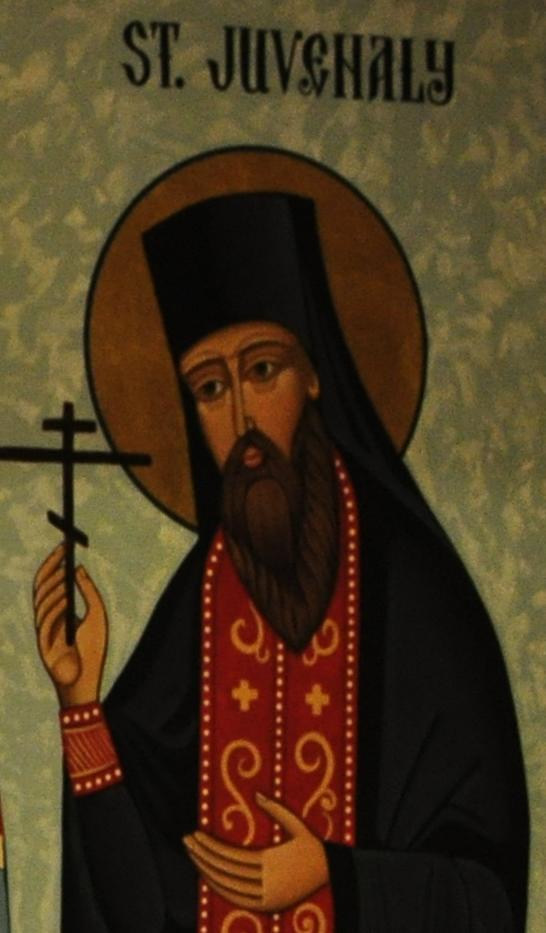
Hieromartyr Juvenal the Protomartyr of America.

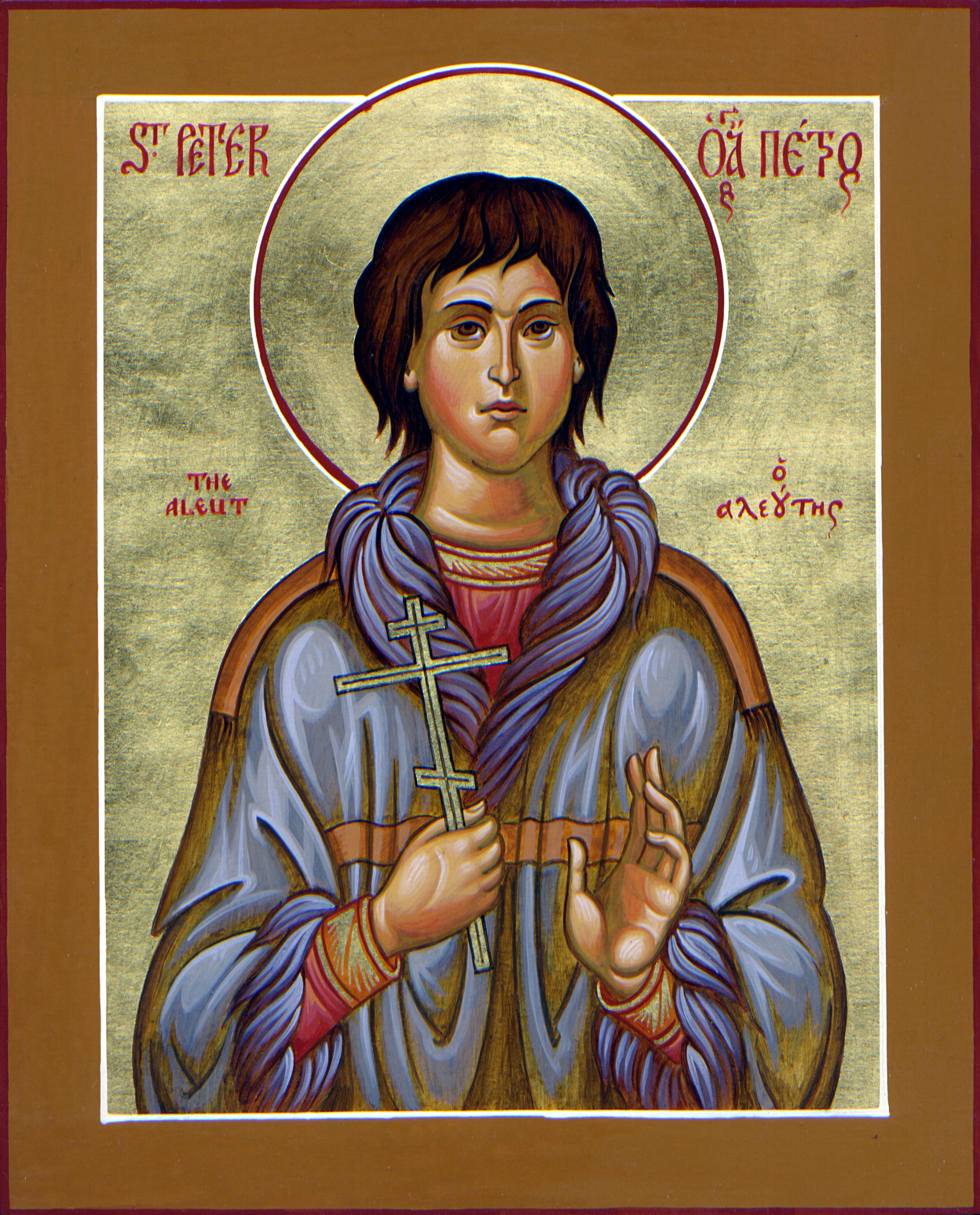
St. Peter the Aleut.

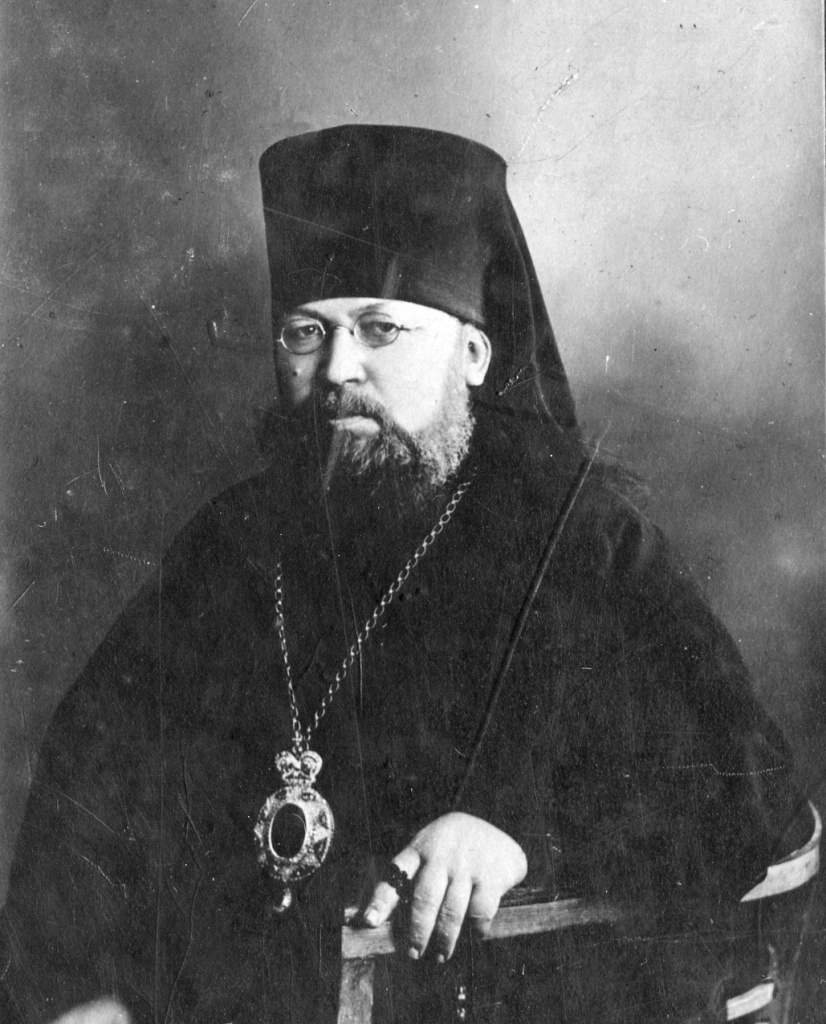
New Hieromartyr Anatole (Kamensky) of Irkutsk.

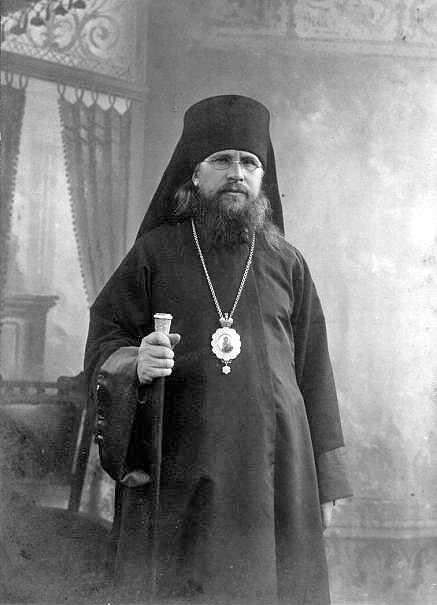
New Hieromartyr Seraphim (Samoilovich) of Uglich.

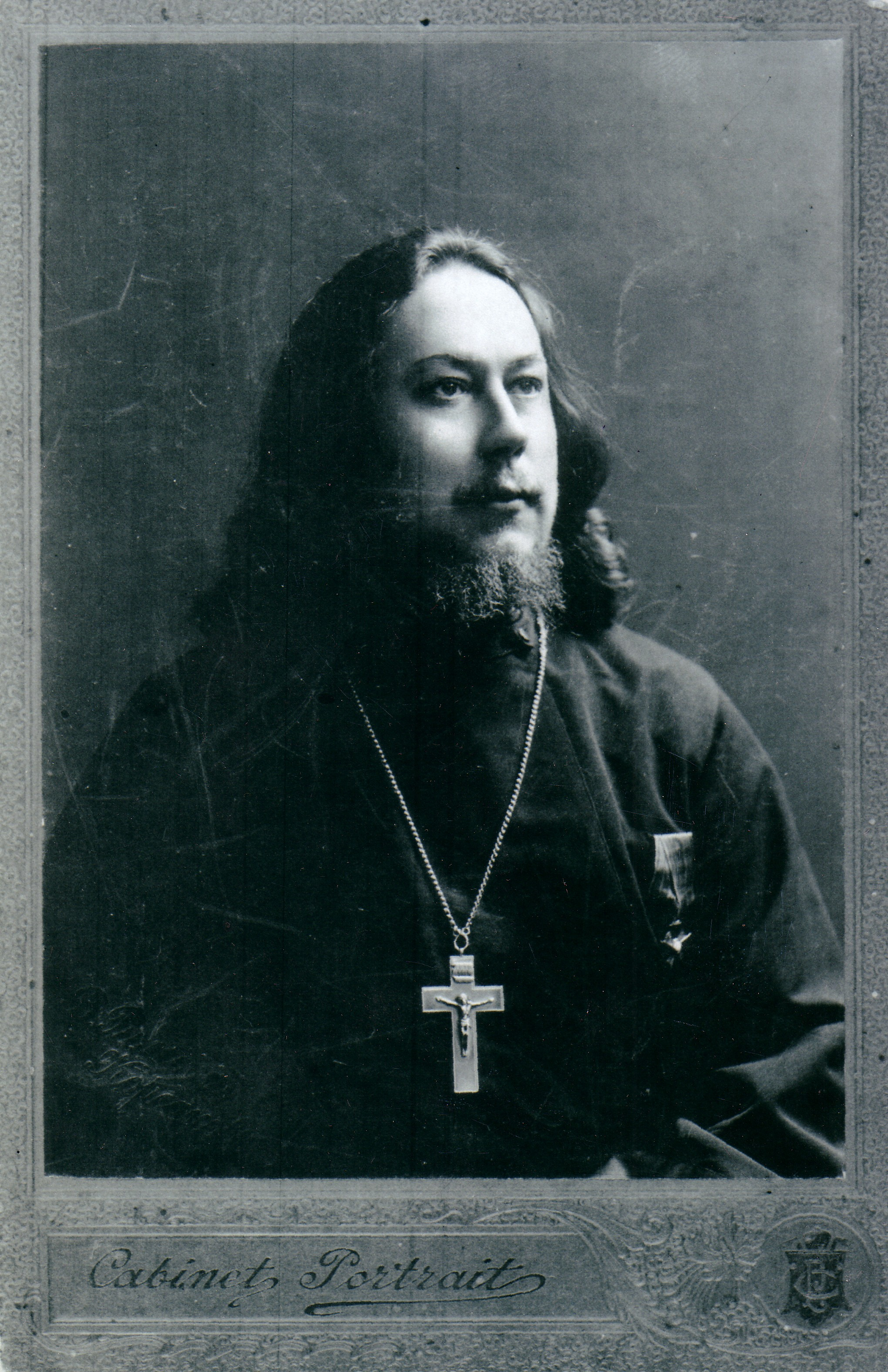
St. John Kochurov.

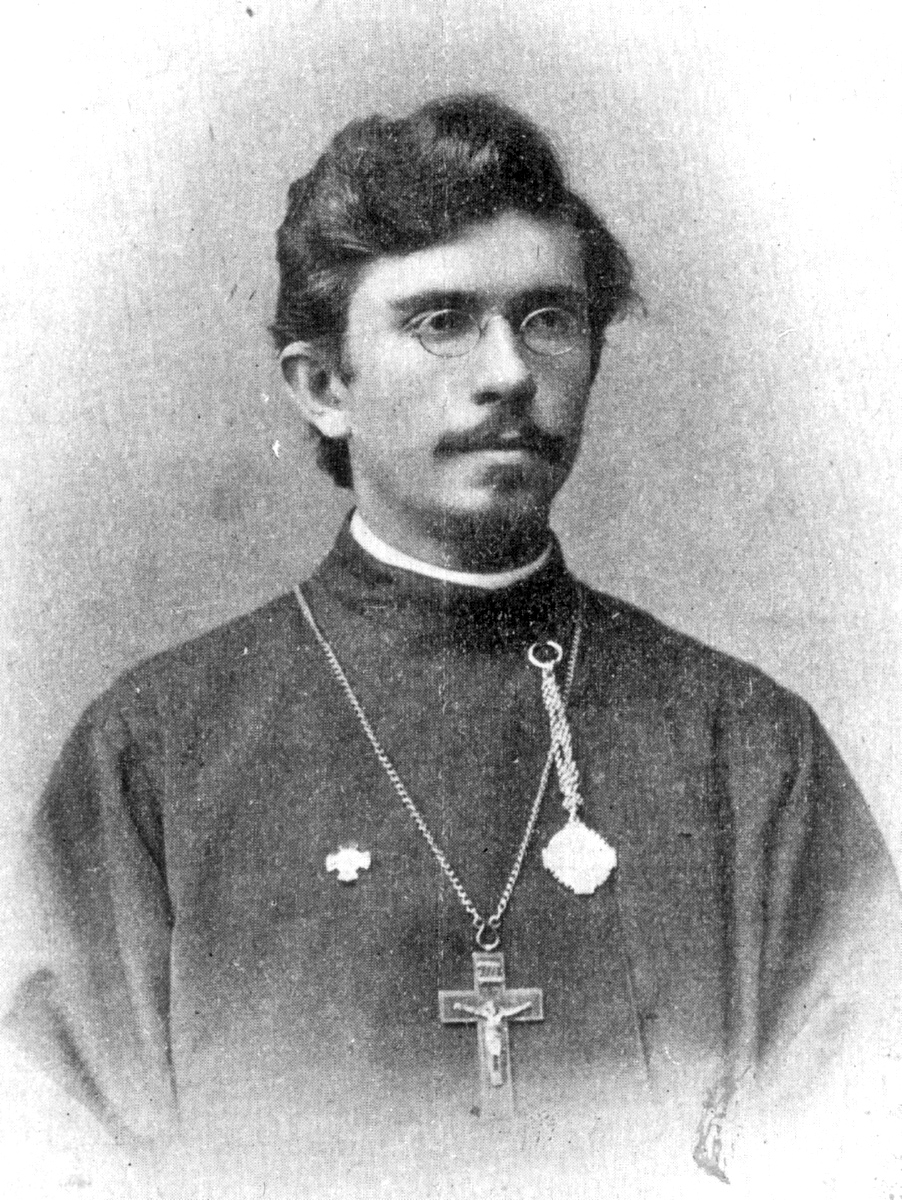
St. Alexander Hotovitzky.

== Sources ==
- December 12/25. Orthodox Calendar (PRAVOSLAVIE.RU).
- December 25 / December 12. HOLY TRINITY RUSSIAN ORTHODOX CHURCH (A parish of the Patriarchate of Moscow).
- December 12. OCA - The Lives of the Saints.
- The Autonomous Orthodox Metropolia of Western Europe and the Americas (ROCOR). St. Hilarion Calendar of Saints for the year of our Lord 2004. St. Hilarion Press (Austin, TX). p. 93.
- December 12. Latin Saints of the Orthodox Patriarchate of Rome.
- The Roman Martyrology. Transl. by the Archbishop of Baltimore. Last Edition, According to the Copy Printed at Rome in 1914. Revised Edition, with the Imprimatur of His Eminence Cardinal Gibbons. Baltimore: John Murphy Company, 1916.

Greek Sources

- Great Synaxaristes: (in Greek) 12 ΔΕΚΕΜΒΡΙΟΥ. ΜΕΓΑΣ ΣΥΝΑΞΑΡΙΣΤΗΣ.
- (in Greek) Συναξαριστής. 12 Δεκεμβρίου. ECCLESIA.GR. (H ΕΚΚΛΗΣΙΑ ΤΗΣ ΕΛΛΑΔΟΣ).

Russian Sources

- (in Russian) 25 декабря (12 декабря). Православная Энциклопедия под редакцией Патриарха Московского и всея Руси Кирилла (электронная версия). (Orthodox Encyclopedia - Pravenc.ru).
- (in Russian) 12 декабря (ст.ст.) 25 декабря 2014 (нов. ст.). Русская Православная Церковь Отдел внешних церковных связей. (DECR).
