= December 13 (Eastern Orthodox liturgics) =

Day in the Eastern Orthodox liturgical calendar

Eastern Orthodox liturgical calendar
December 12	December 13	December 14
December 13 O.S. ≍ December 26 N.S. December 13 N.S ≍ November 30 O.S.

An Eastern Orthodox cross

December 13 in Eastern Orthodox liturgical calendars is a feast day and a day of commemoration of saints and martyrs. Although some Orthodox churches use the Revised Julian Calendar and others use the traditional Julian calendar, the fixed commemorations for their respective December 13 are broadly the same, no matter which calendar is used. (Note: Despite the dates being the same, the days to which they refer typically differ by 13 days. The notation Old Style or O.S. is sometimes used to indicate a date in the traditional Julian Calendar (the "Old Calendar"). The notation New Style or N.S. indicates a date in the Revised Julian calendar (the "New Calendar").)

== Saints ==
- Martyrs Eustratius, Auxentius, Eugene, Mardarius, and Orestes, at Sebaste, also known as the Holy Five Martyrs of Sebaste (284-305)
- Venerable Ares, Monk in the Egyptian desert
- Saint Auberius, Bishop
- Venerable Arsenius the Ascetic of Mt. Latros (c. 8th-10th century) (Note: Exactly when he lived is not known. However, his biographical information indicates that he existed between the 8th and 9th centuries. He originated from Constantinople, from a rich and noble family. He was patrician and strategies, Kibyrrhaiotai and then the Byzantine fleet. Arsenius himself was a Patrician (Patrikios) and Strategos of the Cibyrrhaeot Theme, and later of the [Byzantine fleet. Once during a terrible storm the ships sank, and of all the soldiers, only St. Arsenius was saved. After this he became a monk, and mortified his flesh by fasting, vigil and hardships.)

== Pre-Schism Western saints ==
- Martyr Antiochus of Sulcis, under the Emperor Hadrian (c. 110)
- Virgin Martyr Lucia (Lucy) of Syracuse (304) (Note: Hymns: Collect: "HEAR us, O God our Saviour: that as we rejoice in the festival of blessed Lucy, thy Virgin and Martyr, so we may be taught by the influence of her loving devotion. Through Thy Son Jesus Christ our Lord."; Antiphon: "In thy patience, thou O Lucy, didst possess thy soul; thou hast hated the things of this world, O Bride of Christ, and so hast glory amongst the Angels; thou didst vanquish the adversary O Martyr, with thine own blood.")
- Saint Columba of Terryglass and Holy Island on Lough Derg, Ireland (549) (see also: December 12)
- Saint Judoc (Judocus, Judganoc, Josse) of Ponthieu, Priest, brother of King Judicäel of Brittany, became a hermit in Villiers-Saint-Josse (c. 668)
- Saint Aubert, Bishop of Cambrai-Arras in France, founded monasteries including Saint Vaast in Arras (669)
- Saint Odilia (Otilia, Othilia) of Alsace, Gaul (c. 720) (Note: By tradition St. Ottilia was born blind and for this reason rejected by her family. She was adopted by a convent where she miraculously recovered her sight. Eventually she founded convents at Hohenburg (now Odilienberg) in Alsace in France and at Niedermünster in Germany.)
- Saint Edburga of Minster-in-Thanet, a disciple of Saint Mildred, whom she probably succeeded as Abbess of Minster-in-Thanet in 716 (751) (Note: "ST. EDBURGA was the disciple of St. Mildred, and succeeded her in the government of the monastery. The community had so greatly increased, that the new Abbess found it necessary to begin her administration with the erection of larger buildings for their accommodation. This she happily completed with the addition of a new church, dedicated to the Apostles St. Peter and St. Paul, to which she translated the relics of St. Mildred. St. Edburga lived to an advanced age, to the great profit of her spiritual daughters, and to the increase of her own merits before God. Her sacred remains are said to have been translated to Canterbury, together with those of St. Mildred.")
- Saint Tassilo, Duke of Bavaria and a great monastic benefactor, became a monk at Jumièges Abbey, reposed at Lorsch Abbey (c. 794)
- Saints Einhildis and Roswinda, nuns at Hohenburg Abbey in Alsace in France with Saint Ottilia (8th century) (Note: St. Roswinda was probably St. Ottilia's sister. St. Einhild became Abbess of Niedermünster near Hohenburg.)
- Saint Wilfrid (Wiffred), a monk and Abbot of the Monastery of St Victor in Marseilles, France (1021)

== Post-Schism Orthodox saints ==
- Venerable Arcadius of Vyazma, Monk of Novotorsk (Novotorzhok), disciple of Saint Ephrem (1077)
- Saints Neophytos, Ignatios, Prokopios, and Neilos, founders of Machairas Monastery, Cyprus (1145, 1172)
- Saint Mardarius the Recluse of the Kiev Caves (13th century)
- Saint Dositheus (Dosifey, Dosoftei), Metropolitan of Moldavia, Romania (1693)
- Venerable Nicodemus (Nikodemos) of Romania
- Venerable Herman, Wonderworker of Alaska (1836). (Note: The service to Saint Herman may be sung on December 12th, while December 13th was originally thought to be the day of his repose (due to an error in record keeping, December 13, 1837 was originally thought to be the day of Saint Herman's death, and because of the long-established tradition of celebrating his memory on this day, it has remained a feast day). In fact, November 15, 1836 is the anniversary of the death of Saint Herman.) (see also: August 9 - Glorification)
- Saint Innocent of Kherson (1857)

=== New martyrs and confessors ===
- New Hieromartyr Gabriel (Gavrilo) I Rajić, Archbishop of Peć and Serbian Patriarch (1659) (Note: Holy Patriarch Gabriel was born into the noble Raich family. In 1655 together with the Patriarch of Antioch he was present at the Council in Russia, convened by Tsar Alexei Michailovich for deciding the question of correcting the liturgical books. Having received in Russia generous alms for Serbia, which at that time was suffering distress, St. Gabriel returned to his country. But here he was accused of high treason and for his unwillingness to accept the Moslem faith he died in 1659 as a martyr.)
- New Hieromartyr Alexander Yuzefovich, Priest, and Martyr John Menkov (1920) (Note: See: (in Russian) Юзефович, Александр Иванович. Википедии. (Russian Wikipedia).)
- New Hieromartyr Vladimir Lozina-Lozinsky, Protopresbyter of Saint Petersburg (1937) (Note: He is also commemorated on the following feasts: Synaxis of New Martyrs and Confessors of Russia; Synaxis of the Saints of Saint Petersburg) (Note: See: (in Russian) Лозина-Лозинский, Владимир Константинович. Википедии. (Russian Wikipedia).)
- New Hieromartyrs Alexander Pospelov and Jacob Gusev, Priests (1937)
- New Hieromartyr Nicholas Amasiysky, Priest of Alma-Ata (1938)
- New Hieromartyrs Emilian Kireyev and Basil Pokrov, Priests (1941)

== Other commemorations ==
- Sunday of the Holy Forefathers of Jesus Christ (December 11–17)
- Commemoration of the miracle by the Holy Five Martyrs
- Repose of Schemamonk Panteleimon "the Resurrected" of Glinsk Hermitage (1895)
- Repose of Blessed Maximus of Ustiug (1906)
- Repose of Bishop Theodore, Wonderworker of Trolov Convent in Kiev (1924)
- Repose of Hieromonk Joel of Valaam (1937) (Note: "Joel the Gardener (1939). December 13. A gardener by obedience, Hieromonk Joel was of a very friendly disposition and a kind monk who tended his orchard as if it were the garden of Eden, working it with prayer and trepidation. His elder was Schema-abbot Theodore, who lived in the desert. After his death Fr. Joel settled in his cell and lived there for several years. One night his elder appeared to him and said lovingly, "Go away from here, to the monastery" — and two days later he left, only for the other world. His elder called him to the heavenly "garden of Eden" and Fr. Joel was found dead. He was walking in his cell with a box of matches in his hand and suddenly died. Few people acquire such a righteous repose, for which Fr. Joel was ready. This was also very typical of the love Valaam monks had for one another — a love which extended even to the other world. It is considered God's favor when a monk dies on his obedience. An example would be a baker who dies with dough on his hands, as did St. Nicodemus the prosphora baker of the Kiev Caves. He was laid in his coffin without being washed, as a proof of his total obedience, for which he will be rewarded by God.")
- Repose of Archimandrite Gerasim Iscu of Tismana Monastery, Romania (1951) (Note: See: (in Romanian) Mănăstirea Tismana. Wikipedia. (Romanian Wikipedia).)

== Icon gallery ==
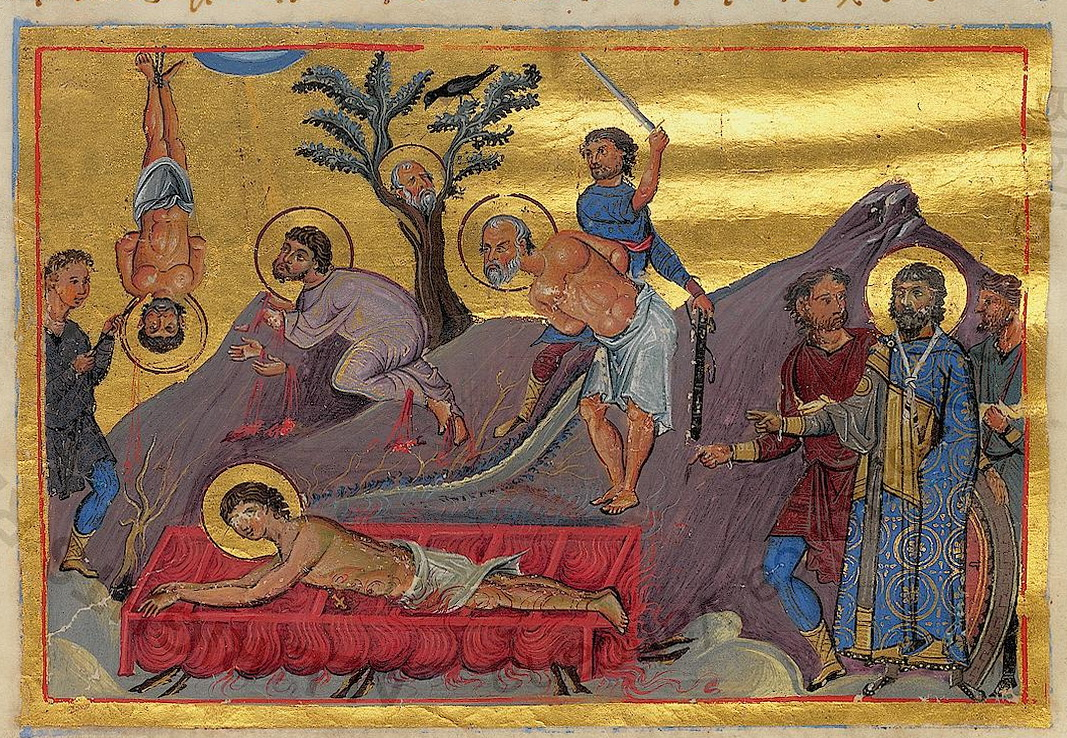
The martyrdom of Eustratius, Auxentius, Eugene, Mardarius and Orestes.
(Menologion of Basil II, 10th century).

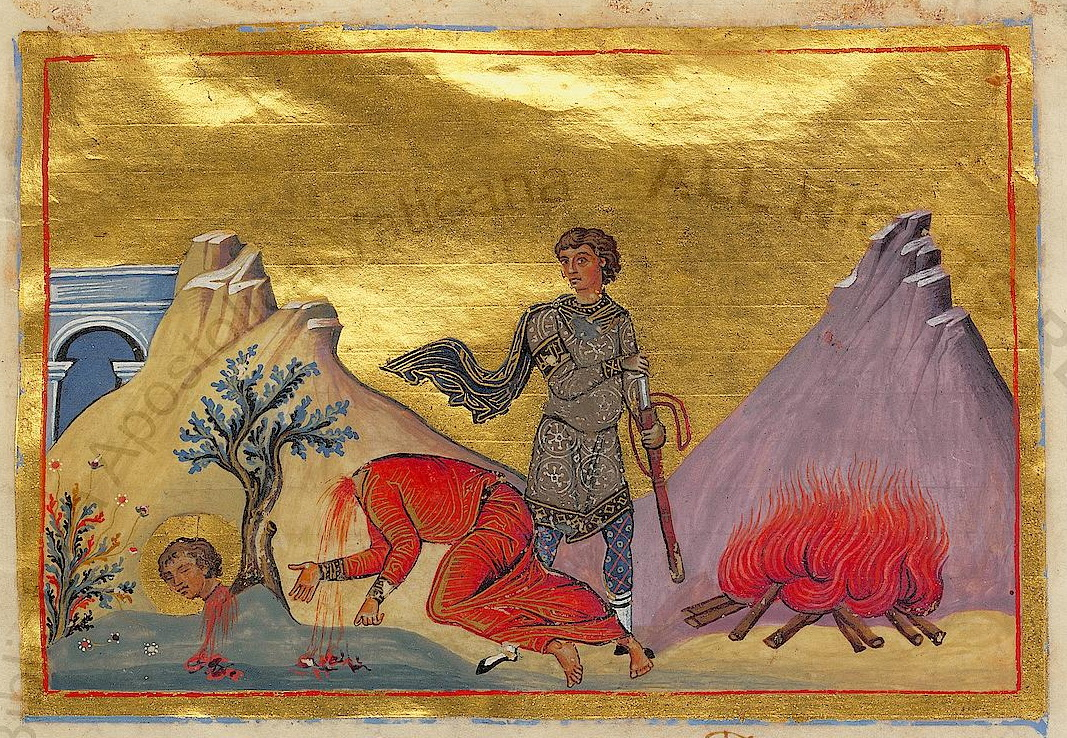
St. Lucy of Syracuse.
(Menologion of Basil II, 10th century).

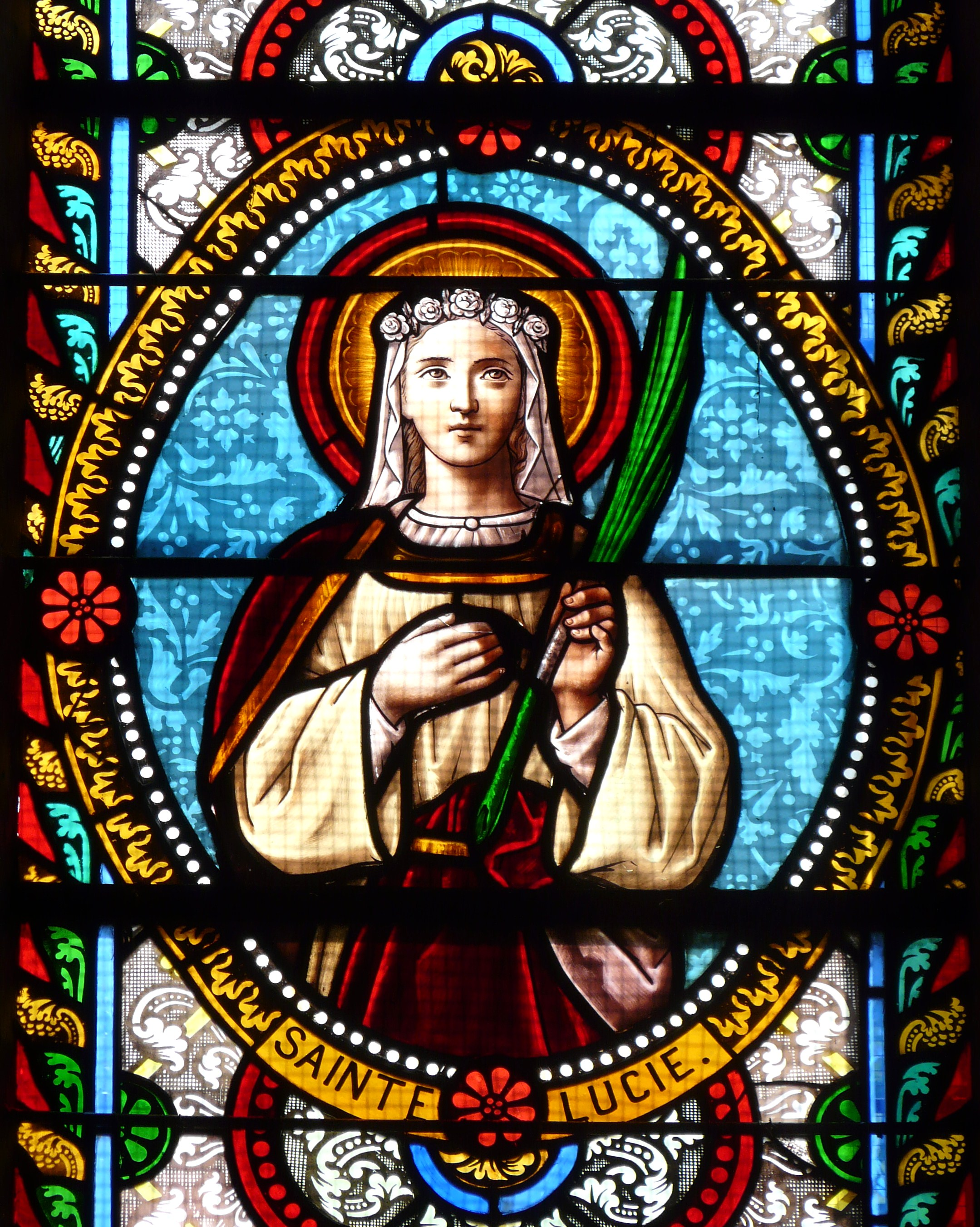
Sainte Lucy, stained glass window, Church of Saint-Joseph, La Coquille, Dordogne, France.

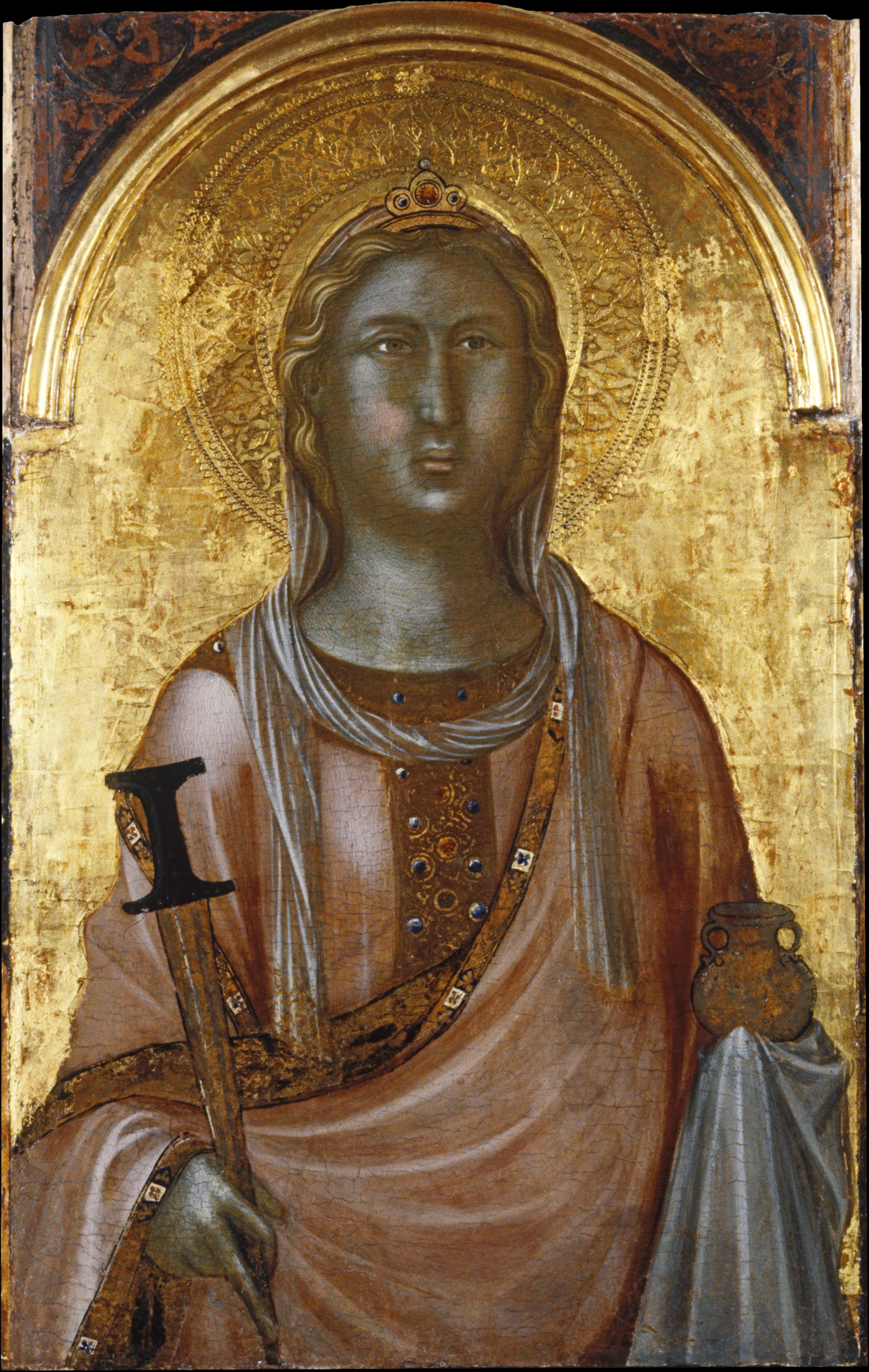
St. Lucy, c. 1340.

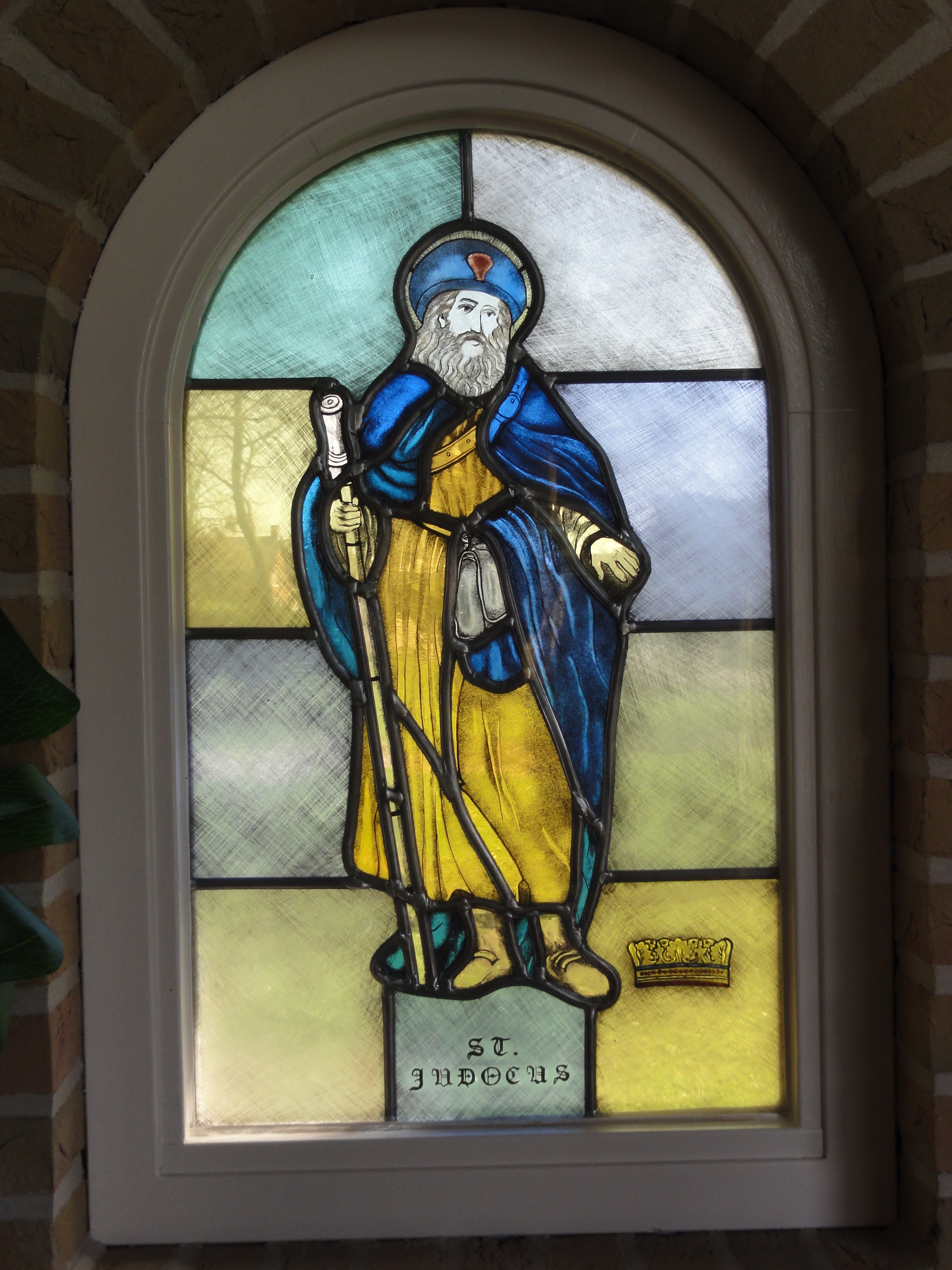
St. Judoc. Stained glass window, Netherlands.

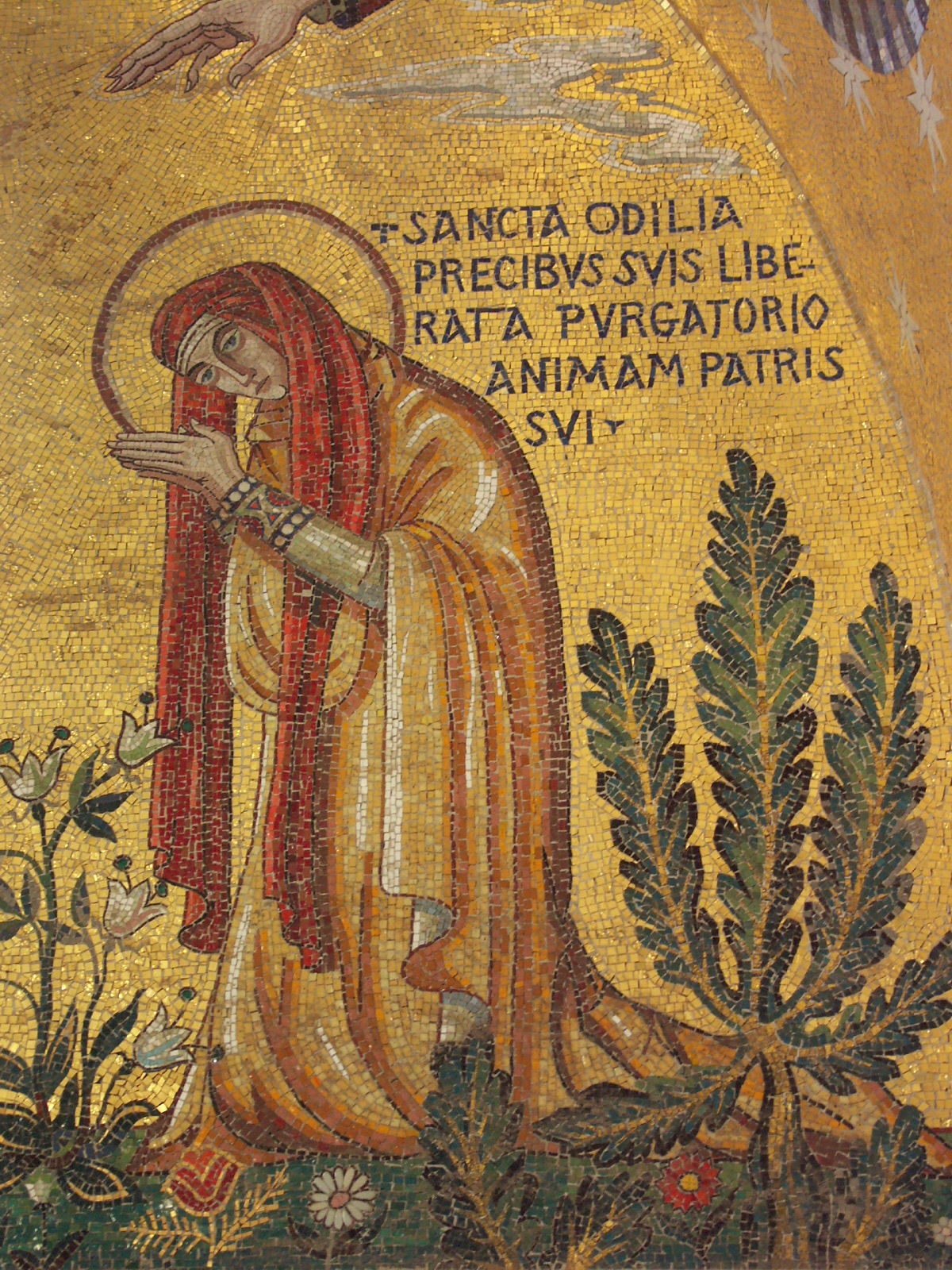
St. Odile of Alsace, in Mont Sainte-Odile, Alsace, France.

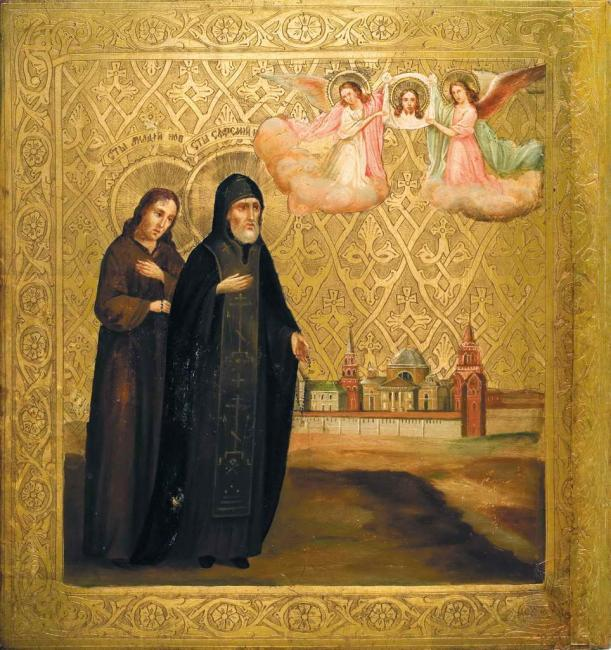
St. Arcadius of Vyazma, Monk of Novotorsk (Novotorzhok), with Saint Ephrem.

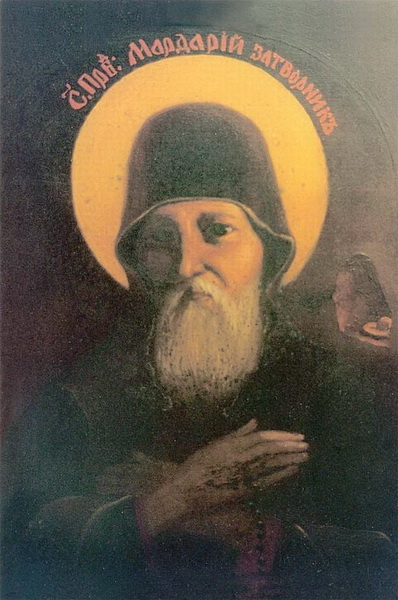
St. Mardarius the Recluse of the Kiev Caves.

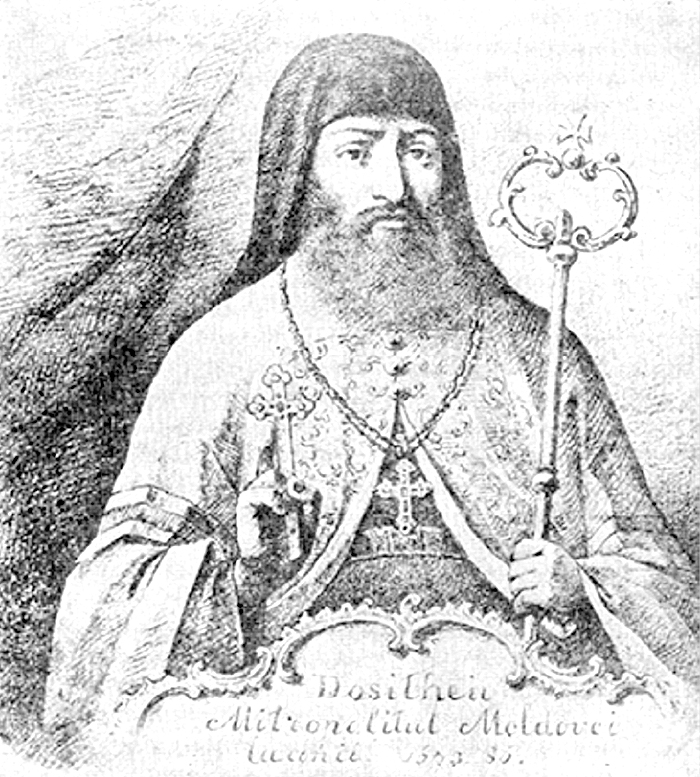
St. Dositheus, Metropolitan of Moldavia.

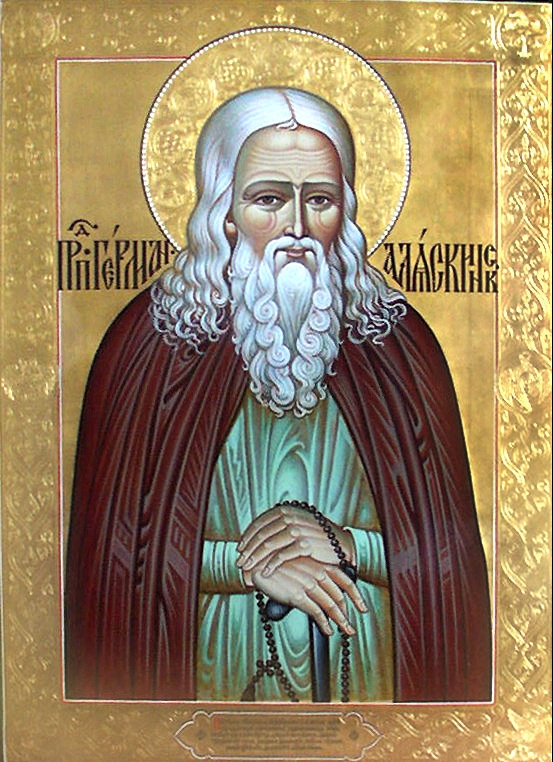
St. Herman of Alaska.

== Sources ==
- December 13/26. Orthodox Calendar (PRAVOSLAVIE.RU).
- December 26 / December 13. HOLY TRINITY RUSSIAN ORTHODOX CHURCH (A parish of the Patriarchate of Moscow).
- December 13. OCA - The Lives of the Saints.
- The Autonomous Orthodox Metropolia of Western Europe and the Americas (ROCOR). St. Hilarion Calendar of Saints for the year of our Lord 2004. St. Hilarion Press (Austin, TX). p. 93.
- December 13. Latin Saints of the Orthodox Patriarchate of Rome.
- The Roman Martyrology. Transl. by the Archbishop of Baltimore. Last Edition, According to the Copy Printed at Rome in 1914. Revised Edition, with the Imprimatur of His Eminence Cardinal Gibbons. Baltimore: John Murphy Company, 1916.

Greek Sources

- Great Synaxaristes: (in Greek) 13 ΔΕΚΕΜΒΡΙΟΥ. ΜΕΓΑΣ ΣΥΝΑΞΑΡΙΣΤΗΣ.
- (in Greek) Συναξαριστής. 13 Δεκεμβρίου. ECCLESIA.GR. (H ΕΚΚΛΗΣΙΑ ΤΗΣ ΕΛΛΑΔΟΣ).

Russian Sources

- (in Russian) 26 декабря (13 декабря). Православная Энциклопедия под редакцией Патриарха Московского и всея Руси Кирилла (электронная версия). (Orthodox Encyclopedia - Pravenc.ru).
- (in Russian) 13 декабря (ст.ст.) 26 декабря 2014 (нов. ст.). Русская Православная Церковь Отдел внешних церковных связей. (DECR).
