= Eliakim, son of Abiud =

Eliakim
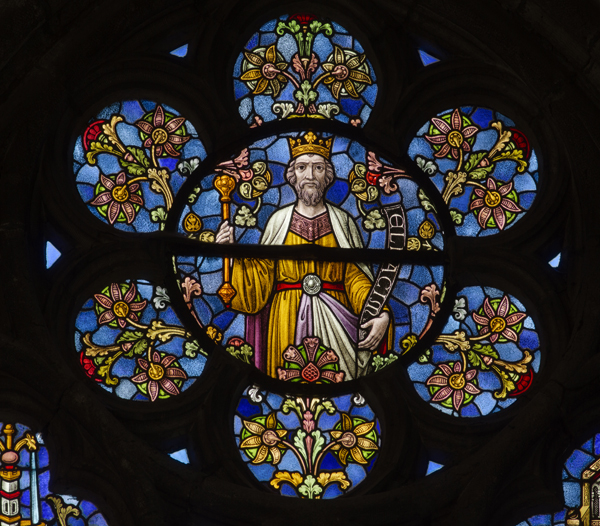
- Elikim in stained glass window: The Tree of Jesse, 1934 (detail), by Gustave Ladon. North transept, Church of Our Lady of Pamele, Oudenaarde, East Flanders, Belgium

Patrilineal ancestor of Jesus
- Venerated in: Eastern Orthodox Church; Eastern Catholic Churches; Byzantine Catholic Church
- Canonized: Pre-congregation
- Feast: Feast of the Holy Fathers: Sunday before the feast of the Nativity, falling 18–24 December (together with the other ancestors of Jesus)

Eliakim appears in the Genealogy of Jesus according to Matthew as a son of Abihud or Abiud and the father of Azor according to the accounts of Matthew (1:13). He is the Grandson of Zerubbabel, and a descendant of the Davidic Line.

== Veneration ==
Eliakim is venerated as a saint by the Eastern Catholic and Orthodox Church as a Holy Patriarch and celebrated during the second part of the Sunday of the Holy Fathers between 18 and 24 of December.

Eliakim is present in churches namely Padova Church of St. Francesco and the most known is the painting of Eliakim in the Sistine Chapel delineated by Michelangelo.

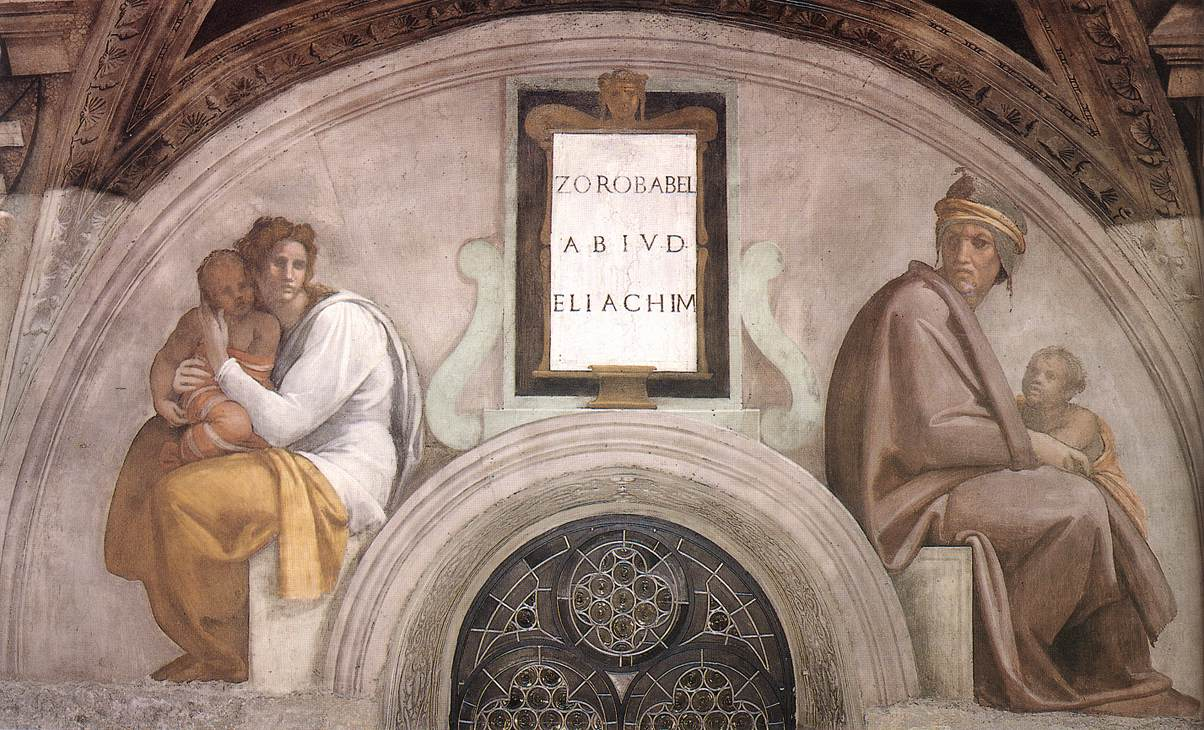
Lunette in the Sistine Chapel with Eliakim and his father Abihud and his grandfather Zerubbabel

== Genealogy ==
According to Matthew 1:1–17, Eliakim, was the son of Abihud and the father of Azor. Therefore, he is of the Davidic Lineage. He is also not to be confused with the Eliakim of Luke's Genealogy whose son is Jonam and father is Melea. Like any other generations after Zerubbabel, he was not mentioned in the Old Testament through the Davidic Lineage. Robert H. Gundry suggests that Matthew simply made up these names in order to fill up the space between the return from the exile and the time of Christ. Gundry conjectures that his name can refer to a priest from the tribe of Levi, namely Eliezer. Eliezer (Eliakim) succeeded Abihu (Abihud) as priest shortly after his death. According to Gundry, Matthew modifies the name once again due to the fittingness of the name to the figure's ancestor. Some scholars speculate that the names of Eliakim's era were merged.

It is unknown when Eliakim died or when he was born because he is briefly even mentioned in the Bible only as being the son of Abihud and the father of Azor.
