= Matthew 1:14 =

- ← 1:13 1:15 →
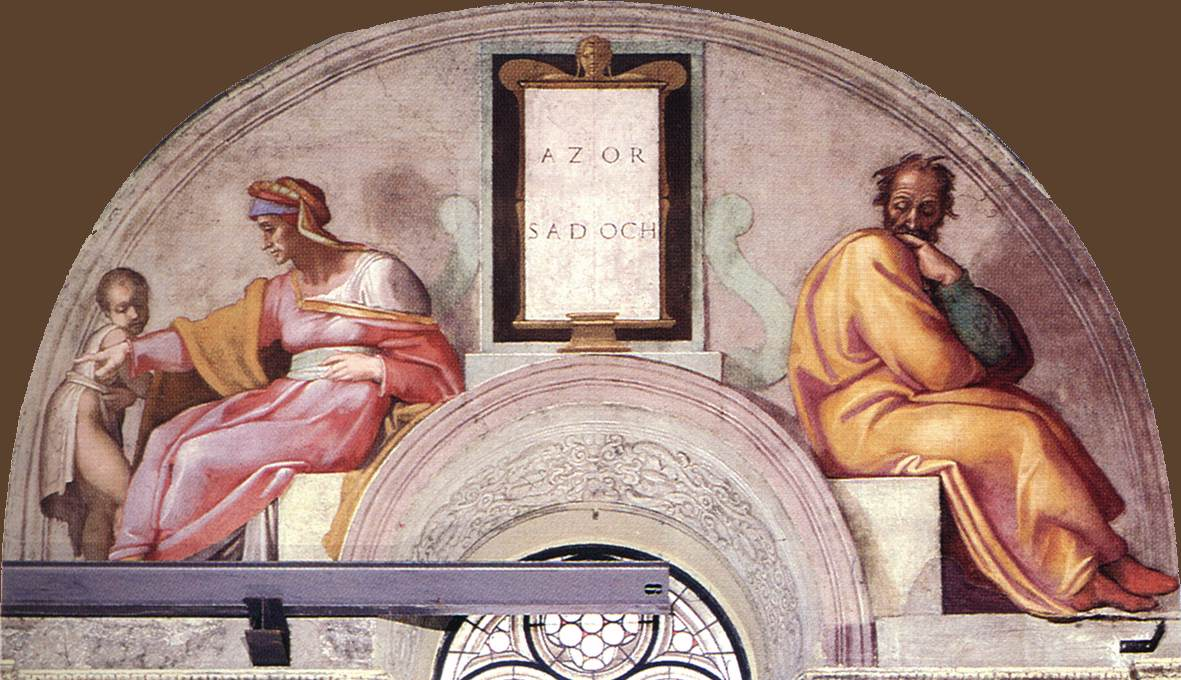
- Michelangelo's Azor - Sadoc/Zadok.
- Book: Gospel of Matthew
- Christian Bible part: New Testament

Matthew 1:14 is the fourteenth verse of the first chapter of the Gospel of Matthew in the New Testament. The verse is part of the section where the genealogy of Joseph, the father of Jesus, is listed.

== Content ==
In the King James Version of the Bible the text reads:

And Azor begat Sadoc;
and Sadoc begat Achim;
and Achim begat Eliud:

The World English Bible translates the passage as:

Azor became the father of Sadoc.
Sadoc became the father of Achim.
Achim became the father of Eliud.

For a collection of other versions see BibleHub Matthew 1:14

== Analysis ==
This part of the genealogy falls in the period after the Babylonian captivity. All four people mentioned here are only mentioned in this passage and are not mentioned in any other source. They are absent from the genealogy in Luke 3.

Robert H. Gundry asserts, without foundation, that Matthew did not know the ancestors of Jesus during the period and instead essentially made them up. He was copying the early list from the Old Testament and Gundry sees the author of Matthew turning to this same source for some plausible ancient names but they were modified to make the copying less obvious.

He sees the name Azor being a shortened form of the priest Azariah. Mentioned just above Zariah is Zadok, a priest from King David's time. Matthew adds him as the next name. Zadok's son is Achimaas and this is shortened to Achim. Eliezer is also a figure from 1 Chronicles and this name is turned into Eliud.

The name Zadok appears twice in the Old Testament, once for the prominent priest of King David and once as an incidental figure mentioned as the grandfather of Jotham, an individual who was himself mentioned at Matthew 1:9. While it is almost certainly a coincidence, W. D. Davies and Dale Allison also note that the founder of the Qumran community was also named Zadok. This figure lived sometime between 240 B.C. and 170 B.C., and is thus in approximately the correct time period.

| Preceded by Matthew 1:13 | Gospel of Matthew; Chapter 1 | Succeeded by Matthew 1:15 |
