= Matthew 1:15 =

- ← 1:14 1:16 →
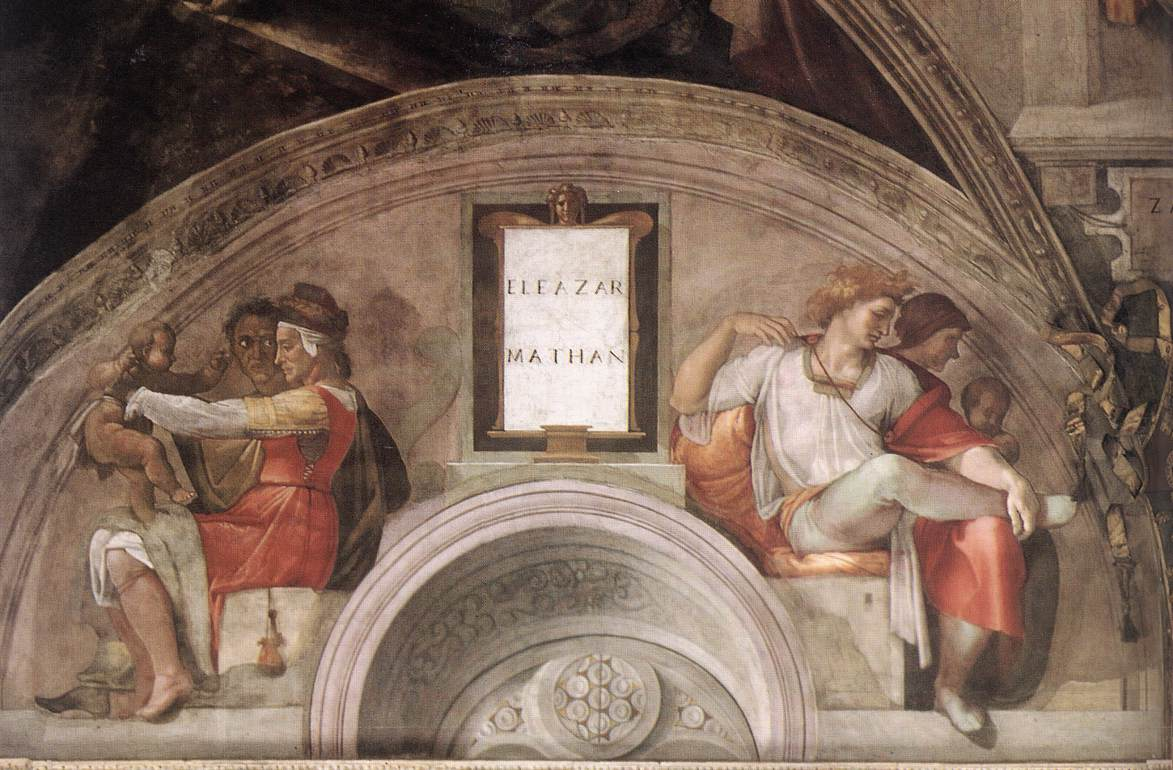
- Michelangelo's Eleazar-Matthan
- Book: Gospel of Matthew
- Christian Bible part: New Testament

Matthew 1:15 is the fifteenth verse of the first chapter of the Gospel of Matthew in the New Testament. The verse is part of the section where the genealogy of Joseph, the father of Jesus, is listed.

== Content ==
In the King James Version of the Bible the text reads:

And Eliud begat Eleazar;
and Eleazar begat Matthan;
and Matthan begat Jacob;

The World English Bible translates the passage as:

Eliud became the father of Eleazar.
Eleazar became the father of Matthan.
Matthan became the father of Jacob.

For a collection of other versions see BibleHub Matthew 1:15

== Analysis ==
This section goes through Joseph's great-grandfather Eleazar, grandfather Matthan, and father Jacob. None of these figures are mentioned anywhere other than in Matthew and nothing else is known about them. As with most of the later section of Matthew's genealogy it conflicts with that given in Luke 3. There is some similarity in this passage: Matthew gives Joseph's grandfather as Matthan and Luke as Matthat; the other names, however, are wholly different. Eleazar was a common Old Testament name, appearing many times in that work.

Robert H. Gundry, who is highly skeptical of the earlier parts of Matthew's genealogy, believes that these later figures are likely accurate as it is unlikely no one would know who Joseph's father and grandfather were. Even if the author of Matthew did not know their names it is unlikely he would risk being creative as he could be fairly sure that somebody would spot his error. Gundry posits that Eleazar is the last fictional creation and that Matthan and Jacob were real people.

Preceded by Matthew 1:14	Gospel of Matthew; Chapter 1	Succeeded by Matthew 1:16
