= Matthew 1:16 =

- ← 1:15 1:17 →
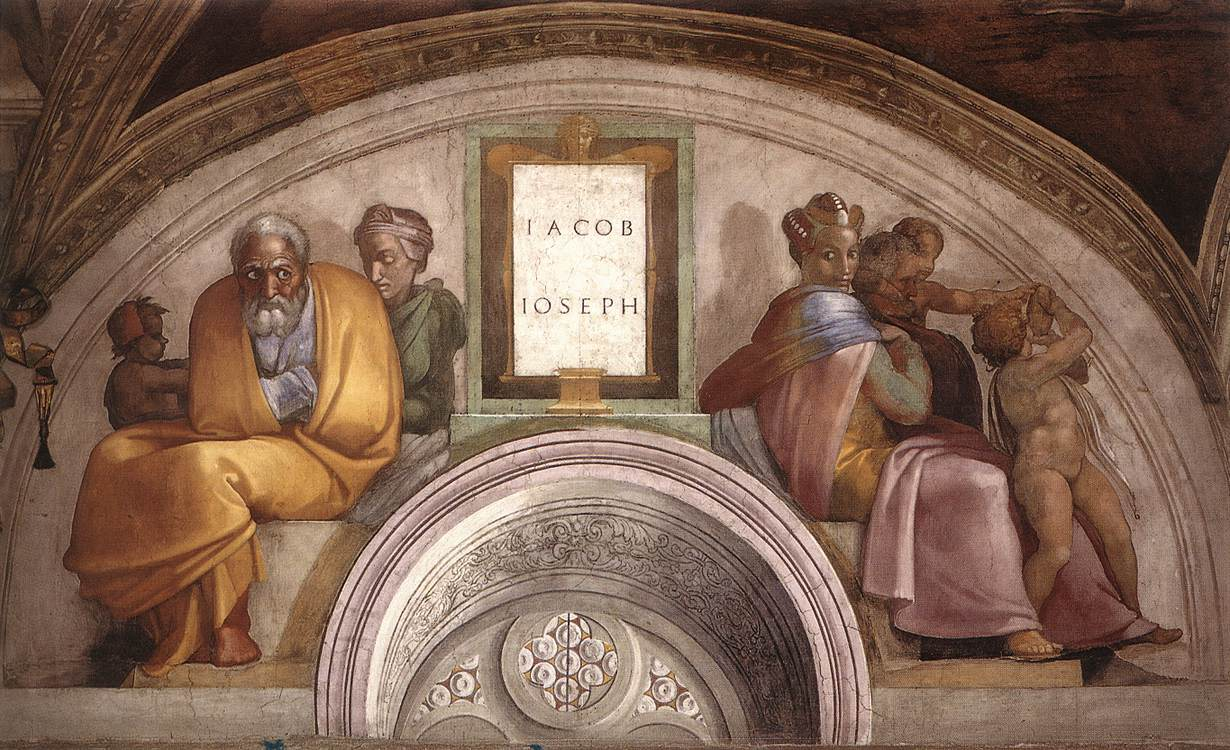
- Michelangelo's Jacob - Joseph
- Book: Gospel of Matthew
- Christian Bible part: New Testament

Matthew 1:16 is the sixteenth verse of the first chapter of the Gospel of Matthew in the New Testament. The verse is the final part of the section that traces the genealogy of Joseph, the husband of Mary, the mother of Jesus, down from Abraham.

== Content ==
In the King James Version of the Bible the text reads:

And Jacob begat Joseph
the husband of Mary, of
whom was born Jesus,
who is called Christ.

The World English Bible translates the passage as:

Jacob became the father of
Joseph, the husband of Mary,
from whom was born Jesus,
who is called Christ.

For a collection of other versions see BibleHub Matthew 1:16

== Analysis ==
This section begins with Jacob, Joseph's father, a figure about which nothing else is known. This also conflicts with Luke 3:23 that states that Heli is Joseph's father. There have been a number of explanations to explain this discrepancy, that Heli is Joseph's father and thus Jesus's grandfather, or Heli could be Mary's father, as noted in the Talmud.

The father of the Old Testament's Joseph is also named Jacob, and W. D. Davies and Dale Allison note that this could mean that the author of Matthew is trying to link Joseph with his Old Testament namesake. There are several other links in the text, both Josephs are spoken to in dreams, both travel to Egypt, and both have similarly righteous personalities.

Matthew breaks with the pattern that has held throughout the genealogy, Joseph did not beget Jesus, but was simply the husband of the woman who did, implying the Virgin Birth. In the original Greek, the word translated as whom is unambiguously feminine. The shift to the passive voice also symbolizes the Virgin Birth.

Brown notes that this verse has attracted considerable scholarly attention because the ancient sources show several different versions of it. Brown translates the Codex Koridethi as:

Jacob was the father of Joseph,
to whom the betrothed virgin
Mary bore Jesus, called the Christ

The Old Syriac Sinacticus has

Jacob was the father of Joseph,
to whom the virgin Mary was
betrothed, was the father of Jesus

These versions could be seen as evidence against the doctrine of the Virgin Birth, especially the Old Syriac Sinacticus version that states that Joseph was Jesus' father. However, both alternate versions actually add the word virgin. Another theory is that the original version of Matthew simply continued the earlier pattern and had "and Joseph was the father of Jesus," without necessarily meaning biological parentage. However the ease of misinterpretation led later transcribers to try to make the verse more clear, with each coming up with their own version.

Brown himself feels that the alternate versions have nothing to do with the Virgin Birth. Rather he argues that an important issue at the time these later copies were made was that of the perpetual virginity of Mary and that both the Koridethi and OSS versions were attempts to do away with the word husband.

Another issue raised by this verse is that if Joseph is no more than the husband of Jesus' mother then why did Matthew devote the last fourteen verses relating his genealogy? Matthew makes clear that although Joseph was not Jesus' biological father, he was his legal father, and at the time legal kinship was generally considered more important than biological descent. Thus Jesus could properly be a member of the House of David despite only being an adopted son.

Preceded by Matthew 1:15	Gospel of Matthew; Chapter 1	Succeeded by Matthew 1:17
