= Dosoftei =

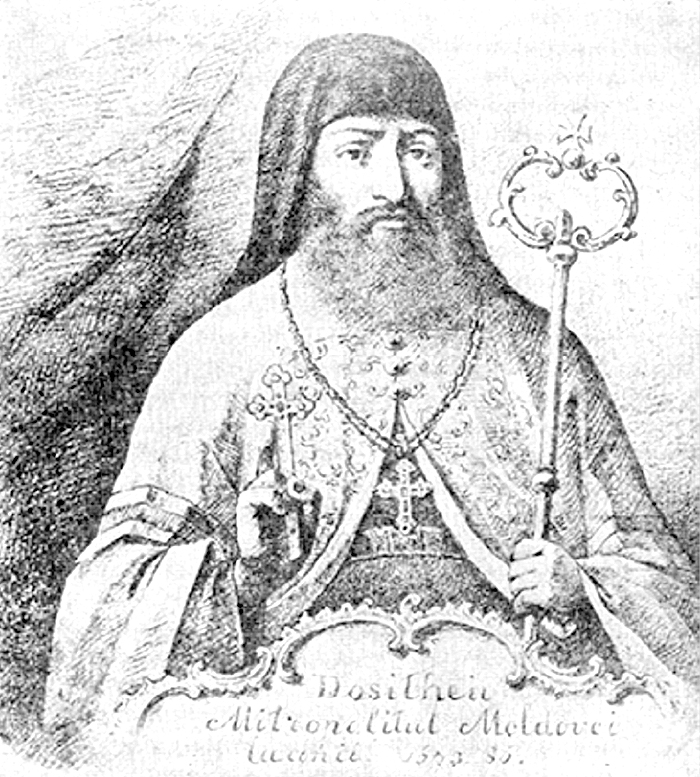
- Metropolitan Dosoftei
- Born: October 26, 1624; Suceava
- Died: December 13, 1693; Zhovkva, Polish–Lithuanian Commonwealth
- Venerated in: October 14, 2005
- Canonized: July 2005 by Synod of the Romanian Orthodox Church
- Feast: December 13

Dimitrie Barilă (Romanian pronunciation: [diˈmitri.e baˈrilə]), better known under his monastical name Dosoftei ([dosofˈtej]; October 26, 1624—December 13, 1693), was a Moldavian Metropolitan, scholar, poet and translator.

Born in Suceava, into a family of Greek origin, he attended the school of the "Trei Ierarhi" Monastery of Iaşi and then at the Orthodox Brotherhood school in Lviv, where he studied humanities and learned several languages.

In 1648 he became a monk at Probota Monastery, and was later bishop of Huşi (1658–1660) and Roman (1660–1671) to become Metropolitan bishop of Moldavia (1671–1674 and again 1675-1686). In 1686 he moved to Poland where he stayed for the rest of his life.

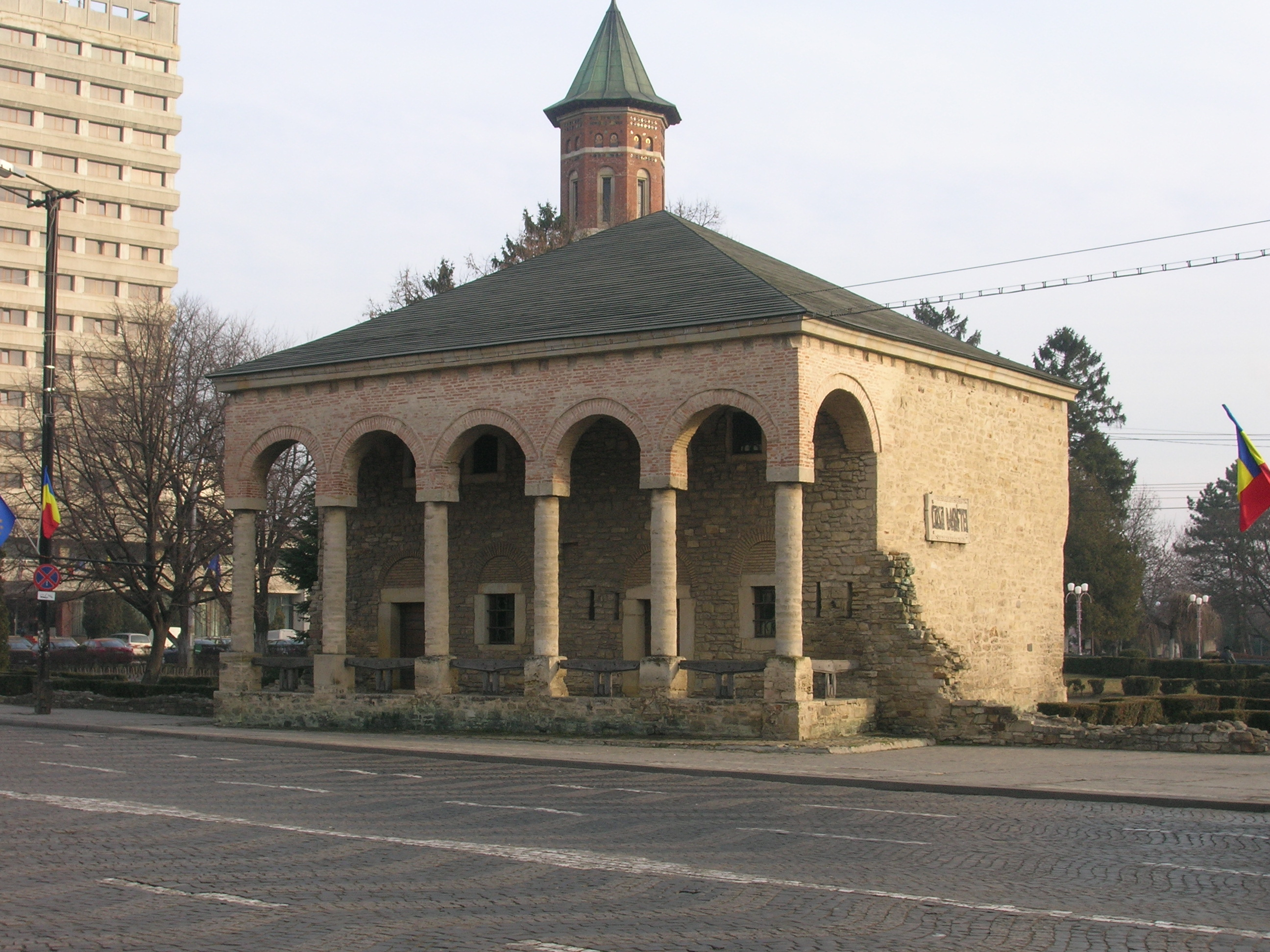
Dosoftei's residence in Iaşi

He was one of the most important Romanian scholars of the 17th century, the first important Romanian language poet and the first translator into Romanian of epics, works on history, as well as religious scriptures Moldavia had. His most famous work is the Romanian psalter in verse.

The Synod of the Romanian Orthodox Church canonized Dosoftei in July 2005, a fact that was proclaimed on October 14, 2005. His feast day is December 13.

In 2015, his bust was installed on the Alley of Ecclesiastical Personalities in Chișinău; it was cast in bronze by sculptor Veaceslav Jiglițchi and placed on a pedestal made of Cosăuți stone, crafted by folk master Veaceslav Lozan.

== Works ==
- Dosofteiu Mitropolitul Moldovei 1671–1686. Psaltirea in versuri publicata de pe manuscrisul original și de pe edițiunea dela 1673 de Prof. I. Bianu. Edițiunea Academieĭ Române. Bucuresci 1887 (Google Google)

== Sources ==
- Абрамов Ф., прот. "Митрополит Сучавский Досифей," Журнал Московской Патриархии, 1974, No. 3, 50-52.
- Mirela Cimpoi, "Dosoftei, sfântul învăţat", Jurnalul Naţional, July 17, 2006
