= Sunday of the Holy Forefathers =

Christian holiday

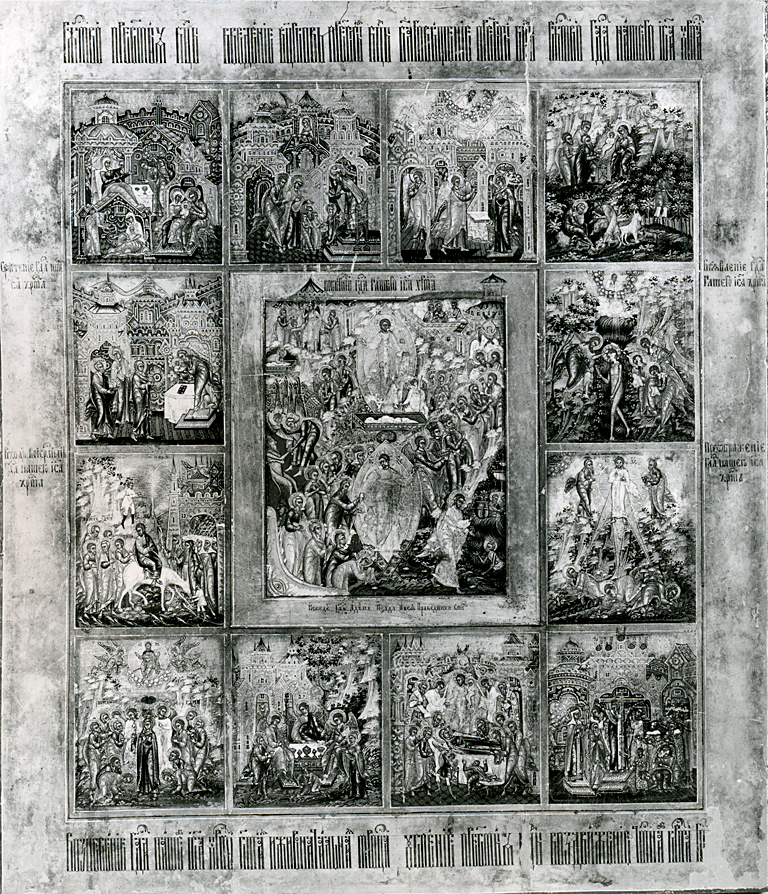
Icon was likely painted in the village of Palekh, one of only a few major centers of icon-painting in nineteenth-century Russia, near the city of Vladimir. It depicts the Resurrection of Christ and the Twelve Church feasts.

Sunday of the Holy Forefathers or Sunday of the Holy Forefathers of Jesus Christ (Κυριακή των Προπατόρων) is a Christian holiday that is always celebrated on a Sunday and always on the second Sunday before Christmas in the Eastern Orthodox Church and in the Eastern Catholic Churches using the Byzantine Rite. The beginning of the celebration is December 11. If December 11 is a weekday, then the holiday is postponed until the following Sunday. This can be perceived in the year 2024: December 11 was a Wednesday, therefore, the holiday was celebrated four days later on Sunday, December 15.

The Sunday that falls between December 11 to 17 is known as the Sunday of the Holy Forefathers. It honors the ancestors of the Old Testament, Those who lived before and under the Law, and those of the flesh, namely the Patriarch Abraham whom the Lord said unto "In thy seed shall all of the nations of the earth be blessed" (Genesis 12:3, 22:18).

== Main verses ==
Two main verses called Apolytikion and Kontakion are known.

=== Apolytikion in the Second Tone ===
The song as the name suggests is sung in the second tone (Phrygian mode) according to the Octoechos system in Byzantine music. The hymn is as follows:

"You justified the Forefathers by faith, and through them betrothed yourself, aforetime, to the Church taken from out of the Gentiles. The saints boast in glory, for from their seed, there exists a noble crop, who is she who without seed has given You birth. By their intercessions, O Christ our God, save our souls."

=== Kontakion in Plagal of the Second Tone ===
The hymn as the name suggests is sung in the plagal of the second tone (Hypophrygian mode), the 6th tone according to the Octoechos system in Byzantine music. The hymn is as follows:

"You did not worship the graven image, O thrice-blessed ones, but armed with the immaterial Essence of God, you were glorified in a trial by fire. From the midst of unbearable flames you called on God, crying: Hasten, O compassionate One! Speedily come to our aid, for You are merciful and able to do as You will."

== Honored people ==
The Great Patriarchs and Matriarchs of the Old Testament, including the Patriarchs Adam, Abraham, Isaac, and Jacob are honored with their own separate hymns. The feast also commemorates the Holy Prophets such as Daniel, Ezekiel, and Elijah, judges, kings, and all who lived of the flesh and under the Law.

=== People honored on both Sundays before the Nativity ===
- Adam and Eve the proto-created (first created)
- Righteous Abel
- Righteous Seth
- Righteous Enos, son of Seth
- Righteous Enoch, son of Jared
- Righteous Noah, son of Lamech
- Righteous Shem
- Righteous Melchizedek, Priest-King of Salem
- Righteous Patriarch Abraham, son of Terah
- Righteous Sarah
- Righteous Patriarch Isaac
- Righteous Rebecca
- Righteous Patriarch Jacob
- Righteous Rachel
- Righteous Patriarch Levi
- Righteous Patriarch Judah
- Righteous Patriarch Joseph
- Righteous Patriarch Benjamin
- Righteous Patriarch Hezron (Esrom, Esron), son of Perez
- Righteous Job
- Prophet Moses
- Righteous Prophet and High Priest Aaron
- Righteous Miriam (Mariah)
- Prophet Hur
- Righteous Joshua, son of Nun
- Righteous Deborah, Judge of Israel and Prophetess
- Righteous Ruth
- Righteous Hannah (Anna), mother of Samuel
- Prophet Samuel
- Patriarch Jesse, son of Obed
- Prophet-King David
- Prophet Nathan
- Prophet-King Solomon
- King Manasseh, son of Hezekiah
- King Josiah, son of Amon
- Righteous Judith
- Righteous Esther
- Righteous Susanna
- Prophet Daniel
- Three Holy Youths: Ananias (Hananiah), Misael (Mishael), and Azarias (Azariah) (Chaldean names: Shadrach, Meshach, and Abednego)

=== People honored on the Sunday of the Holy Forefathers ===
- Righteous Priest Eleazar
- Righteous Barak, Judge of Israel
- Righteous Jael
- Righteous Gideon, Judge of Israel
- Righteous Jephthah, Judge of Israel
- Righteous Samson (Sampson), Judge of Israel
- Prophet Elijah (Elias)
- Prophet Elisha
- Prophetess Huldah
- Prophet Isaiah
- Prophet Nehemiah
- Prophet Habakkuk (Avakum)
- Prophet Obadiah
- Prophet Haggai
- Prophet Zechariah
- Prophet Ezekiel
- Prophet Jeremiah
- Prophet Jonah
- Prophet Malachi
- Prophet Micah (Micaiah)
- Prophet Nahum
- Prophet Zephaniah
- Righteous Mary, mother of Saint Anne (Anna) and grandmother of the Theotokos

=== People honored on the Sunday of the Holy Ancestors (Sunday before the Nativity) ===
- Righteous Kenan (Cainan), son of Enos
- Righteous Maleleel (Mahalalel, Mehaliel, Maleleim)
- Righteous Jared
- Righteous Methuselah, son of Enoch
- Righteous Lamech
- Righteous Japheth, son of Noah
- Righteous Arphaxad (Arpachshad, Arphachshad), son of Shem
- Righteous Cainan (Canaan), son of Arphaxad
- Righteous Salah (Selah, Shelah)
- Righteous Eber
- Righteous Peleg
- Righteous Reu (Ragab)
- Righteous Serug (Seruch)
- Righteous Nahor, son of Serug
- Righteous Terah
- Righteous Leah
- Righteous Patriarch Reuben
- Righteous Patriarch Simeon (Symeon)
- Righteous Patriarch Zebulun
- Righteous Patriarch Issachar
- Righteous Patriarch Dan
- Righteous Patriarch Gad
- Righteous Patriarch Asher
- Righteous Patriarch Naphtali
- Righteous Asenath (Asineth)
- Patriarch Perez (Pharez), son of Judah
- Patriarch Zerah (Zerach), son of Judah
- Patriarch Ram (Aram), son of Hezron
- Patriarch Amminadab
- Patriarch Nahshon
- Patriarch Salmon
- Patriarch Boaz
- Patriarch Obed
- King Rehoboam, son of Solomon
- King Abijah
- King Asa
- King Jehoshaphat
- King Jehoram (Joram, an evil king)
- King Ahaziah (Ochoziah)
- King Uzziah (Oziah, Ozias)
- King Jotham
- King Ahaz (a faithless king)
- King Hezekiah
- King Amon (Ammon, Amos), son of Manasseh
- King Jeconiah, son of Josiah
- Patriarch Shealtiel
- Patriarch Zerubbabel
- Patriarch Abiud (Abihud)
- Patriarch Eliakim (Eliachem)
- Patriarch Azor
- Patriarch Zadok
- Patriarch Achim
- Patriarch Eliud
- Patriarch Eleazar
- Patriarch Matthan
- Patriarch Jacob
- Patriarch Joseph the Betrothed
- Righteous Sarafthia (Saraphthia) of Zarephath to whom Elias was sent
- Righteous Somanitis of Shunem who hosted Elisha
- Righteous Ezra (Esdras)

== See also ==
- Genealogy of Jesus
- Palm Sunday
- Christmas
- Easter
