= Abihud =

Biblical characters

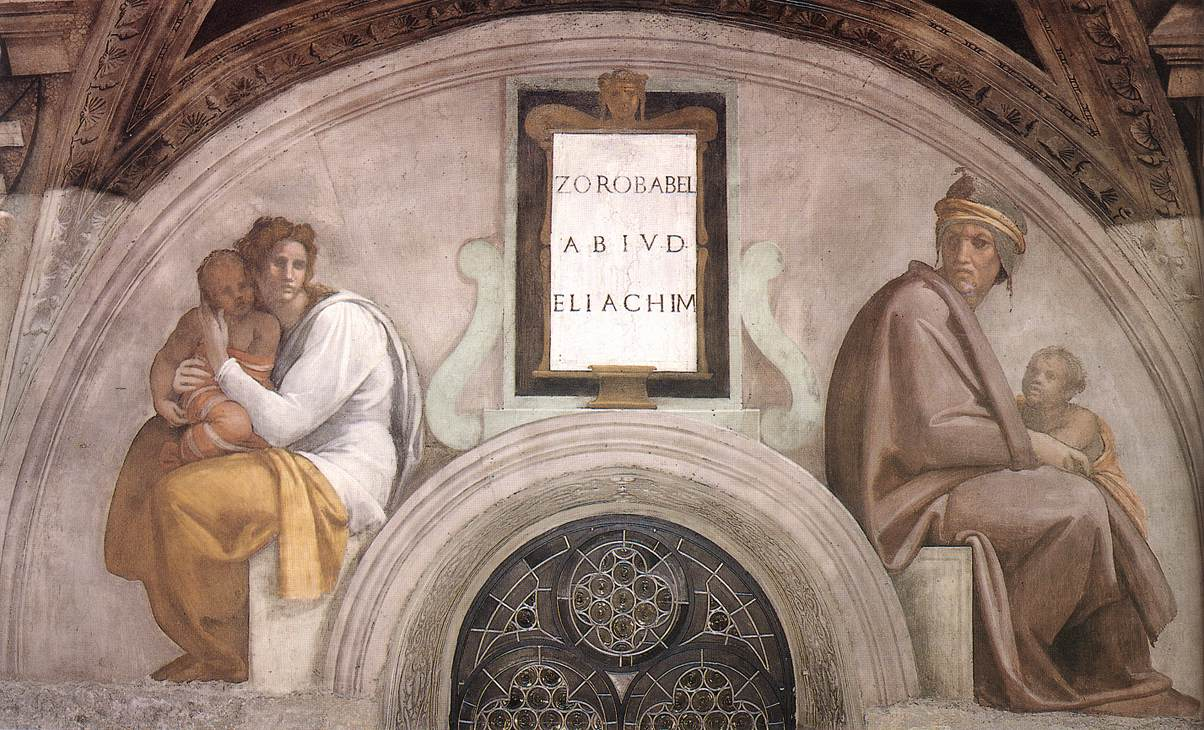
- Lunette in the Sistine Chapel of Abihud with Zerubbabel and Eliakim.
- Children: Eliakim
- Parent: Zerubbabel

There are two biblical characters named Abihud.

- One of the sons of Bela, the son of Benjamin; called also Ahihud (1 Chronicles 8:3,7).
- A son or grandson of Zerubbabel, and member of the Davidic line. Abihud was the father of Eliakim (Matthew 1:13, "Abiud"), and possibly the same as Obadiah (1 Chronicles 3:21).

The name may also occasionally be romanized as Abioud (Greek) or 'Abiyhuwd (Hebrew).

== Meaning ==
The name "Abihud" means "the (divine) father is glory", according to Cheyne and Black (1899). The name "Ehud" is probably a shorter form of "Abihud."

== Descendants ==
In the genealogy of Jesus, Abihud's male-line descendants are depicted:

- Generation 1: Eliakim
- Generation 2: Azor
- Generation 3: Zadok
- Generation 4: Achim
- Generation 5: Eliud
- Generation 6: Eleazar
- Generation 7: Matthan
- Generation 8: Jacob
- Generation 9: Joseph
- Generation 10: Jesus
