= Abra of Poitiers =

Nun and saint

Saint Abra
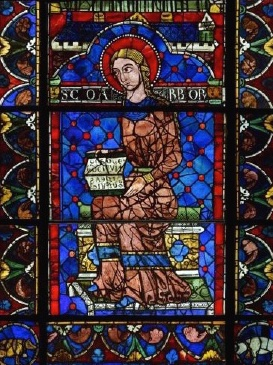

Virgin
- Born: 12 December 339
- Died: 360
- Venerated in: Catholic Church; Eastern Orthodox Church
- Beatified: Pre-congregation
- Feast: 12 December

Abra of Poitiers/ˈæbrə/ (c. 343 – c. 360), Afra or Apra is a Christian saint who may have lived in the 4th century.

Her existence is historically uncertain, but she may have been the daughter of Hilary of Poitiers.

== Hagiography ==
According to hagiographical accounts, Abra converted to Christianity following the example of her father. She is remembered for her work among the poor and spreading of Christianity in the area around Poitiers, France. She would have died shortly after his return in 360, supposedly at the age of seventeen or eighteen. According to medieval legendary accounts, her father would have witnessed her death.

Her feast day is celebrated on 12 December in Poitiers.

== Historicity ==
Her existence itself is controversial; some scholars argue that she may not be the daughter of Hilary of Poitiers or that she may never have existed.

Hilary of Poitiers was married; however, the existence of Abra is uncertain, as it is attested by hagiographical accounts that date two centuries after the life of Hilary. In particular, a letter that Hilary is said to have sent to her is considered a medieval forgery. In this letter, he expressed concern about her fate and engaged in a conversation with her about the health of his mother.

In the surviving manuscripts containing pseudonymous hymns of Hilary, she is named Abra, Afra, or Apra.

== Legacy ==
=== Literature ===
She was compared to the biblical figure of Sarah by some medieval authors.

Montaigne mentioned the event of her death, which he knew through medieval sources, to apply the situation to his own time.
