= Matthew 1:13 =

- ← 1:12 1:14 →
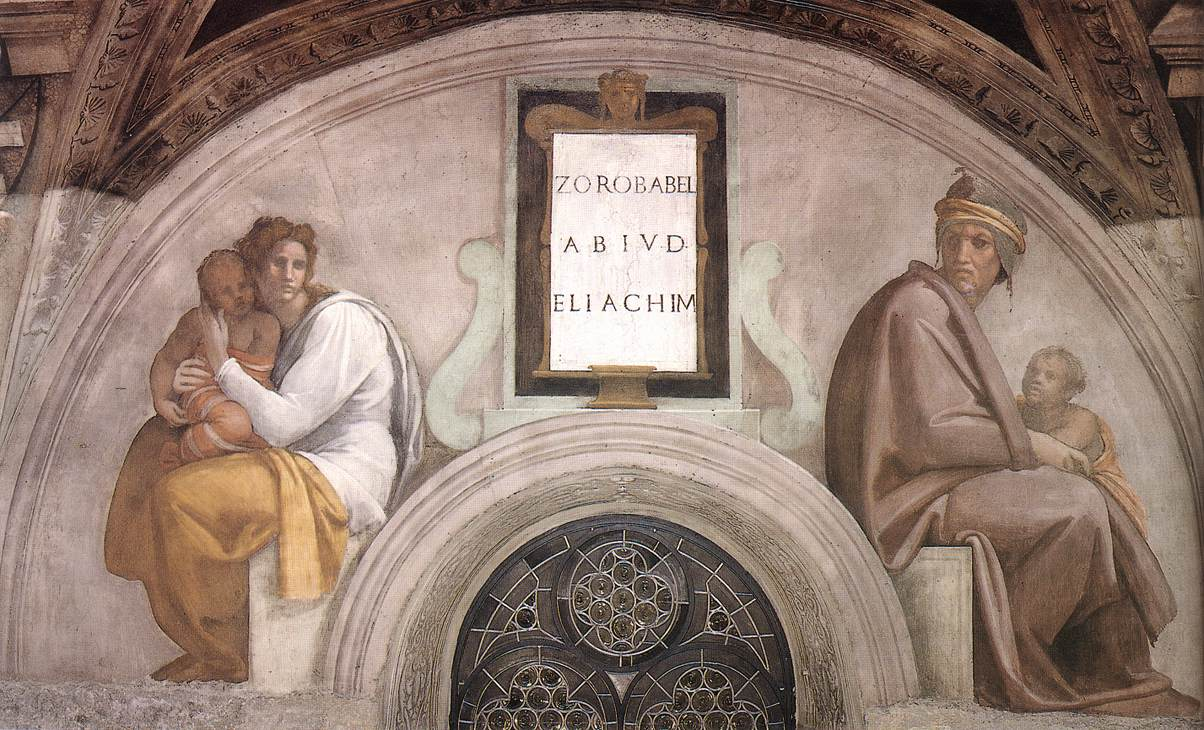
- Michelangelo's Zerubbabel - Abiud - Eliakim it is unknown who each of the figures is meant to represent.
- Book: Gospel of Matthew
- Christian Bible part: New Testament

Matthew 1:13 is the thirteenth verse of Matthew 1 of the Gospel of Matthew in the New Testament. The verse is part of the section where the genealogy of Joseph, the father of Jesus, is listed. This verse covers the section somewhat after the Babylonian Captivity six generations before Jesus.

== Content ==
In the King James Version of the Bible the text reads:

And Zorobabel begat Abiud;
and Abiud begat Eliakim;
and Eliakim begat Azor;

The World English Bible translates the passage as:

Zerubbabel became the father of Abiud.
Abiud became the father of Eliakim.
Eliakim became the father of Azor.

For a collection of other versions see BibleHub Matthew 1:13.

== Analysis ==
Zerubbabel is reported to have had a number of children, but no other source includes one named Abiud. The Eliakim listed is not to be confused with Jehoiakim, who is sometimes referred to as Eliakim. Zerubbabel son of Shealtiel is also listed in the genealogy of Jesus that appears in Luke 3:27. For a full discussion of this issue see Genealogy of Jesus#Explanations for divergence.

Those listed in this part of the genealogy lived in the period after the Babylonian captivity and six generations before Jesus. Traditionally Zerubbabel's period is believed to have started in 539 BC, while Azor, the last listed, is said to have died in 372 BC. This is a long period of time for just four people and many scholars feel an accurate list would be longer. Luke's genealogy has far more names covering this period. That this part of the genealogy is usually lacking in papponymic naming leads William F. Albright and C.S. Mann to speculate that over the generations the repeating and similar names were merged.

Of the people listed in this passage only Zerubbabel is well known. He plays an important role in the Book of Ezra and appears elsewhere in the Bible. It is at this point that the Old Testament histories conclude, and the other three figures listed here are only known from this genealogy. It is thus unknown where the rest of the genealogy comes from. As noted in Josephus, prominent Jewish families did keep detailed genealogical records, and the author of Matthew may have had access to some of these. Each local government also kept genealogical records to ensure proper rules of inheritance were followed.

In the opinion of Robert H. Gundry, the rest of the genealogy is a creative fiction by the author of Matthew to fill in the gap between the end of the Old Testament sources and Jesus' birth. He argues that the reason Abiud, Eliakim, and Azor are not known outside this passage is because the author of Matthew made them up. It is also Gundry's opinion that once the list moves away from the accepted genealogy of Jewish leaders, it is fabricated until it reaches the known territory of Joseph's grandfather. Gundry does not imagine that Matthew has made up the list entirely. The names listed do fit the period of history. Rather Gundry speculates that the author, who might have been copying the list of kings from the Old Testament, turned to that source for the names of Joseph's ancestors. Specifically, he purports that the names are all drawn from 1 Chronicles, but may have been modified to not make the copying obvious.

Abihu was one of the priests whose name means "son of Judah." Gundry speculates that the author of Matthew liked the meaning behind this name and so it was slightly modified to become Abiud. Eliezer succeeded Abihu and his name may have been changed to Eliakim by the author of Matthew, linking him to the Eliakim mentioned in Isaiah 22 and to Jehoiakim, a king that was left out of the earlier narrative. Azariah, another priest, may have had his name shortened to create the name Azor.

Preceded by Matthew 1:12	Gospel of Matthew; Chapter 1	Succeeded by Matthew 1:14
