= Zedazeni Monastery =

Georgian Orthodox monastery near Mtskheta, Georgia

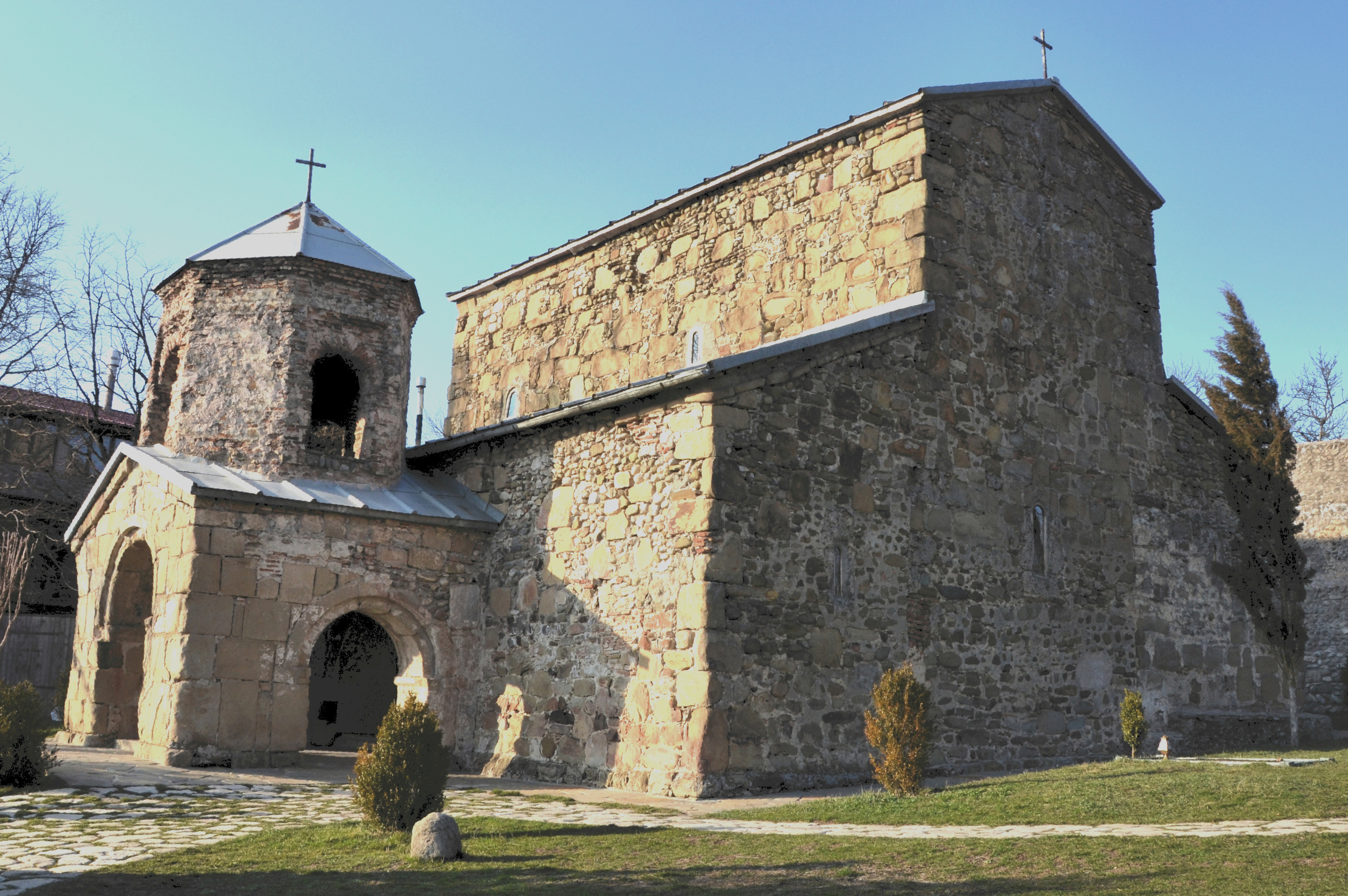
- The Zedazeni Monastery

- Location within Mtskheta-Mtianeti Location within Georgia

Religion
- Affiliation: Georgian Orthodox Church

Location
- Location: (Georgia (country)) Mtskheta Municipality, Georgia
- Interactive map of Zedazeni Monastery
- Coordinates: 41°52′16″N 44°45′56″E

Architecture
- Type: Monastery, church, castle
- Style: Georgian

Zedazeni Monastery (Georgian: ზედაზნის მონასტერი) is a monument of medieval Georgian architecture and a monastic complex, is located northeast of Mtskheta, on the left bank of the Aragvi River, on the slope of Zedazeni Mountain of the forested Saguramo Ridge. According to historical tradition, a pagan idol of Zaden stood here, on whose site, in the 540s, one of the Thirteen Assyrian Fathers, John, founded a Christian monastery. Later he became known as John of Zedazeni, and the monastery as the Monastery of John of Zedazeni. Of the scribes who worked at Zedazeni, only the abbot Michael (11th century) is known; on his initiative and based on material he supplied, an anonymous author created the metaphrastic version of The Life of John of Zedazeni.

== Architecture ==
Among the monastic buildings preserved today is the three-aisled basilica of St. John the Baptist, built at the behest of Catholicos Clement at the end of the 8th century (the earlier small hall-church is incorporated into its structure). The basilica is square in plan; its central nave is narrow and tall, with a semicircular apse to the east. The interior space is divided into three bays by semicircular supporting arches of brick resting on two pairs of pilasters. Light enters through windows cut into the upper parts of the sanctuary and the longitudinal walls.

The south and north aisles communicate with the main nave through horseshoe-shaped brick arches. In the eastern part of the north aisle lies a small hall-church built at the turn of the 6th–7th centuries; its rectangular apse is roofed with a horseshoe-shaped conch supported by conical tromps. The sanctuary is elevated by four steps. Here stands John of Zedazeni's stone sarcophagus, one-third of which extends into the sanctuary. In the western part of the north aisle there is a water basin.

The south aisle consists of two sections; in its eastern bay, a nearly square chamber is connected by a doorway. The original entrance to the church was from here (the current western entrance was opened later). The structure is built of river stones and cut rubble, partly of brick, with some limestone also present. The façades are simple and plain; the windows on the eastern façade are arranged asymmetrically. The central nave's window is decorated with a relief, and a simple cross is carved on the façade itself.

On the south side of the church adjoins a square, cylindrical-vaulted narthex faced with dressed stone, above which rises an octagonal belfry of brick, open on all four sides with arches. To its west is a small cell, both from the 18th century. Zedazeni Monastery has been repaired several times, last time between 1970 and 1971, when some restoration and landscaping works were carried out.
