= Generations of Adam =

Immediate generations after Adam

"Generations of Adam" is a genealogical concept recorded in Genesis 5:1 in the Hebrew Bible. It is typically taken as the name of Adam's line of descent going through Seth. Another view equates the generations of Adam with material about a second line of descent starting with Cain in Genesis 4, while Genesis 5 is taken as the "generations of Noah".

== Seth and Cain ==
The Sethite line begins with Adam. The Sethite line in Genesis 5 extends to Noah and his three sons. The Cainite line in Genesis 4 runs to Naamah. The seventh generation Lamech descended from Cain is described as the father of Jabal and Jubal (from his first wife Adah) and Tubal-cain and Naamah (from his second wife, Zillah).(Genesis 4:17–22; Genesis 5; Genesis 4:17–22; Genesis 5:1–32).

Sethite	Cainite
Seth	Cain
Enosh	Enoch
Cainan	
Mahalaleel	
Jared	Irad
Enoch	Mehujael
Methuselah	Methusael
Lamech	Lamech
Noah	Naamah

The Sethite line also gives ages at fatherhood and at death. In the Masoretic text, ages at death range from 777 (Lamech) to 969 (Methuselah) (with Enoch being "taken by God" at age 365 Genesis 5:23–24), placing the text in the category of longevity narratives. The Septuagint and Samaritan Pentateuch differ somewhat in the ages given; in the Septuagint, the age at fatherhood is often 100 years later than that in the Masoretic text, extending the genealogy by several centuries.

The 2nd-century BC Book of Jubilees, regarded as non-canonical except by the Ethiopian Orthodox Church and the Beta Israel, gives the wives' names for the Sethite line:

Husband	Wife
Seth	Azura
Enos	Noam
Cainan	Mualaleth
Mahalaleel	Dinah
Jared	Baraka
Enoch	Edna
Methuselah	Edna
Lamech	Betenos
Noah	Emzara

== Comparisons ==
Form critics consider the two lines as corruptions of one tradition. Both the similarities and the differences between lines are significant and do not admit simple explanation. Still, there is a general consensus that the Cainite list was from the Jahwist source, while the Sethite was added in from the Priestly source.

The Sethite genealogy may also be connected to the Sumerian King List. Evidence for this include the solar symbolism of the seventh figure on each list (the Sumerian king Enmeduranna sharing his name with the city where worship of the sun god was focused, Enoch living 365 years). Like Enoch, Enmeduranna's advisor Utuabzu ascended to heaven. Fritz Hommel further argued that Amelon was Enosh (both third in the list with names meaning "mankind"), that Ammenon was Cainan/Cain (both fourth and connected to craftsmanship), and so on; noting that the tenth in each line was a hero who survived a world flood. Still, this position is argued against due to linguistic incompatibilities in half the names. Similarities between Irad and Eridu have also been pointed out. Thomas Kelly Cheyne argued that the two genealogies may also be connected to a North Arabian genealogy, one reproducing the other. Cheyne claimed that Mahalalel was a corruption of Jerahmeel, and Methuselah was a corruption of Ishmael. Cheyne's theories are now rejected, however.

The following table displays the most common line of comparison between the Sethite and Cainite lines (which reverses much of the Cainite list), as well as North Arabian genealogy (per Cheyne), and the Sumerian king list.

Sethite line	Cainite line	North Arabian (Chayne)	Sumerian kings
1. Adam	1. Adam	1. Jerahmeel	1. Alulim of Eridu
2. Seth	8. [Seth]	2. Eshtaol	2. Alalgar of Eridu
3. Enosh	9. [Enoch]	3. Ishmael	3. Enmenluanna of Bad-tibira
4. Kenan	2. Cain	4. Kain	4. Enmengalanna of Bad-tibira
5. Mahalalel	5. Mehujael	5. Hanoch	5. Dumuzid the Shepherd of Bad-tibira
6. Jared	4. Irad	6. Arvad	6. Ensipazianna of Larak
7. Enoch	3. Enoch	7. Jerahmeel	7. Enmeduranna of Sippar
8. Methuselah	6. Methusael	8. Ishmael	8. Urbatutu of Shuruppak
9. Lamech	7. Lamech	9. Jerahmeel	9. [Illegible]
10. Noah	10. Naamah	10. Nahman	10. Ziusudra

== Additional chronology ==
Post-biblical Jewish chronicles, surviving primarily in Syriac and Geez, elaborate on the genealogies in Genesis.

- The Book of Enoch
- The Book of Jubilees

== See also ==
- Generations of Noah
