= Irad =

Male given name

- Pronunciation: Erad
- Gender: Male

Origin
- Origin: Hebrew
- Region of origin: Abrahamic monotheistic traditions

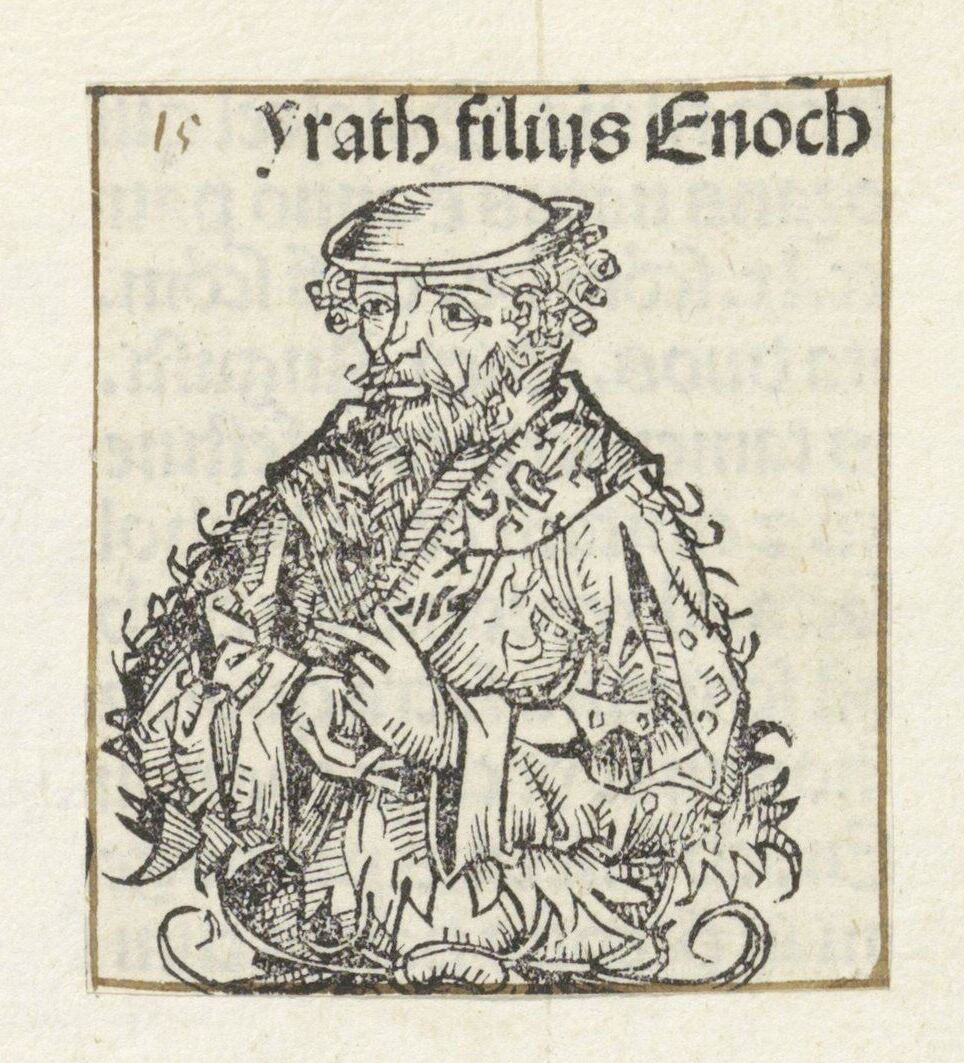
Depiction of Irad in the Nuremberg Chronicle

Irad (Biblical Hebrew: עִירָד, romanized: ʿîrād) is a Hebrew name. In the Book of Genesis, the grandson of Cain is Irad, Son of Enoch.

Genesis 4:18, in a genealogical passage about the descendants of Cain, contains the only reference to Irad in the Hebrew Bible: "To Enoch was born Irad; and Irad was the father of Mehujael, and Mehujael, the father of Methushael, and Methushael the father of Lamech" (New Revised Standard Version of the Christian Bible).

The lineage of Cain in Genesis 4:17–22 closely parallels the lineage of Cain's brother, Seth, found in Genesis 5:1–32. In terms of the documentary hypothesis, the genealogy of Cain is attributed to the Jahwist source (J), while the genealogy of Seth is attributed to the Priestly source (P). The J list and P list contain seven pairs of similar names, and the "Irad" of the J source is parallel to the "Jared" of the P source.

== Family Tree ==
Adam (Note: Genesis 4:1)	Eve
Cain	Abel (Note: Genesis 4:2)	Seth (Note: Genesis 4:25; 5:3)
Enoch (Note: Genesis 4:17)	Enos (Note: Genesis 4:26; 5:6–7)
Irad (Note: Genesis 4:18)	Kenan (Note: Genesis 5:9–10)
Mehujael	Mahalalel (Note: Genesis 5:12–13)
Methushael	Jared (Note: Genesis 5:15–16)
Adah (Note: Genesis 4:19)	Lamech	Zillah	Enoch (Note: Genesis 5:18–19)
Jabal (Note: Genesis 4:20)	Jubal (Note: Genesis 4:21)	Tubal-Cain (Note: Genesis 4:22)	Naamah	Methuselah (Note: Genesis 5:21–22)
Lamech (Note: Genesis 5:25–26)
Noah (Note: Genesis 5:28–30)
Shem (Note: Genesis 5:32)	Ham	Japheth
