= Descendants of Cain =

Descendants of Cain:

- according to Genesis 4:17-24:
  - Enoch (Not Enoch that was taken to heaven without dying. That Enoch was a descendant of Seth, not Cain. [See Genesis 5:1-24])
  - Irad,
  - Mehujael,
  - Methushael,
  - Lamech,
  - Jabal/Jubal/Tubal-cain
- in Beowulf: Grendel, Grendel's mother

== See also ==
- Descendants of Cain (film), a 1968 Korean film
- The Descendants of Cain, a Korean novel
- Descendants of Cain (album), an album by Ka
- Culture hero
- Tribes of Caïn
