= Lamech =

Lamech may refer to:

- Lamech (descendant of Cain)
- Lamech (father of Noah)
- Félix Chemla Lamèch (1894 – 1962), French meteorologist and selenographer.

- Lamèch (crater), a small lunar impact crater named after him
