= Eve =

First woman according to the Abrahamic creation myth

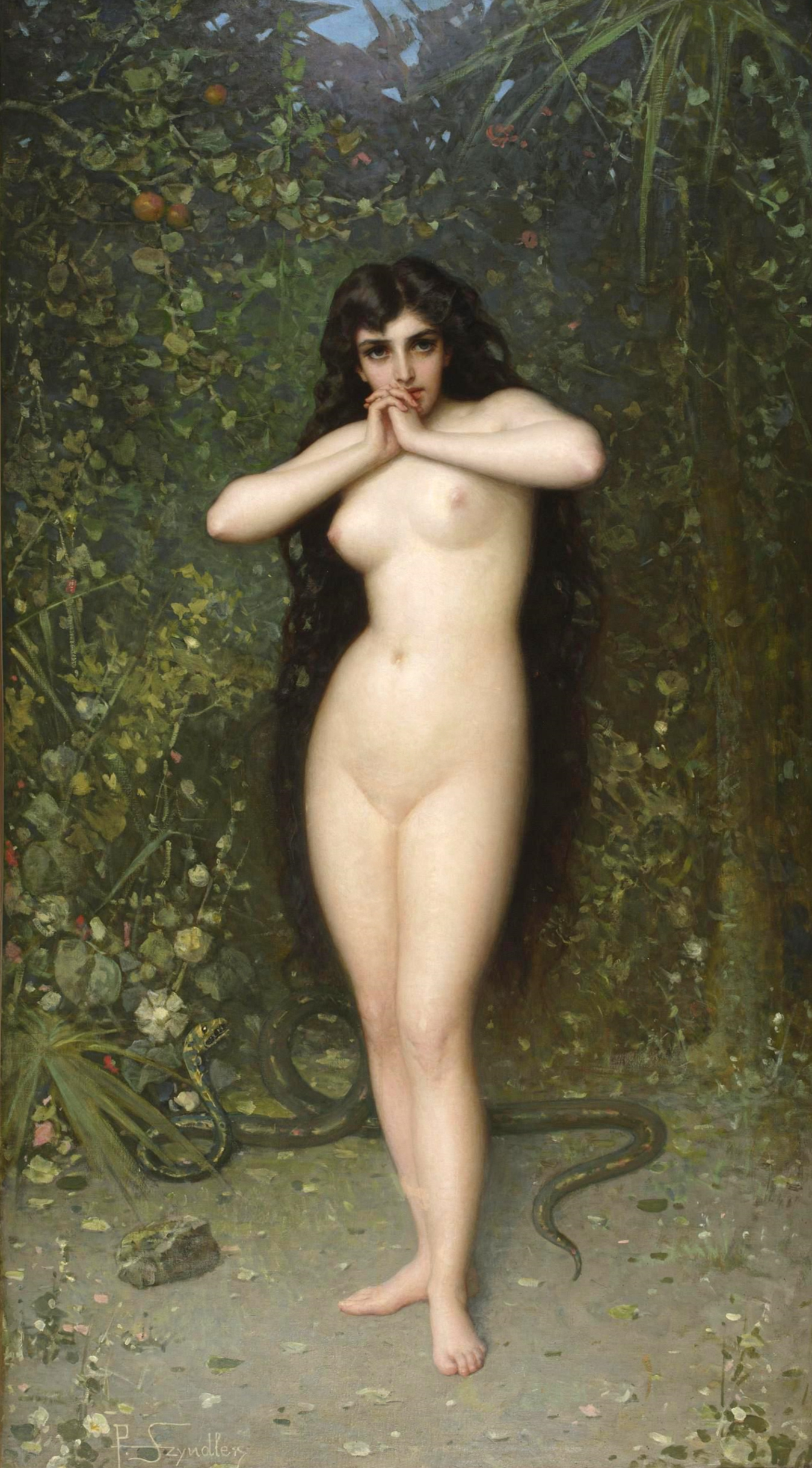
- Eve (1889) by Pantaleon Szyndler
- Era: Edenic and Antediluvian
- Spouse: Adam (Note: Extra-biblical accounts cite Lilith as having preceded Eve as Adam's spouse.)
- Children: Cain, Abel, Seth, other unnamed sons and daughters (Note: Extra-biblical accounts cite Adam as having had three daughters: Awan, Azura, and Luluwa or Aclima.)
- Parent: God (Father/Creator)

The Matriarch
- Born: Garden of Eden
- Venerated in: Christianity (Catholic Church, Eastern Orthodox Church, Oriental Orthodox Church); Judaism; Islam; Baháʼí Faith
- Feast: 24 December

Eve (Note: /ˈiːv/; Hebrew: חַוָּה, Modern: Ḥava, Tiberian: Ḥawwā; Arabic: حَوَّاء, romanized: Ḥawwāʾ; Persian: حوا, romanized: Ḥavā; Greek: Εὕα, romanized: Heúa; Latin: Eva, Heva; Syriac: ܚܰܘܳܐ romanized: ḥawâ) is a figure from the Book of Genesis in the Old Testament. According to the origin story of the Abrahamic religions, she was the first woman to be created by God. Eve is known also as Adam's wife.

Her name means "living one" or "source of life". The name has been compared to that of the Hurrian goddess Ḫepat, who was worshipped in Jerusalem during the Late Bronze Age. It has been suggested that the Hebrew name Eve (חַוָּה) bears resemblance to an Aramaic word for "snake" (Old Aramaic language חוה; Aramaic חִוְיָא). The origin for this etymological hypothesis is the rabbinic pun present in Genesis Rabbah 20:11 (c. 300-500 CE), utilizing the similarity between Heb. Ḥawwāh and Aram. ḥiwyāʾ. Notwithstanding its rabbinic ideological usage, scholars like Julius Wellhausen and Theodor Nöldeke argued for its etymological relevance.

== Etymology ==
"Eve" in Hebrew is "Ḥawwāh" (חווה) and is most commonly believed to mean "living one" or "source of life" from the root "ḥāyâ" (חיה), "to live", from the Semitic root ḥyw.

Hawwāh has been compared to the Hurrian goddess Ḫepat, who was shown in the Amarna letters to be worshipped in Jerusalem during the Late Bronze Age. It has been suggested that the name Ḫepat may derive from Kubau, a woman who was the first ruler of the Third Dynasty of Kish.

It has been suggested that the Hebrew name Eve (חַוָּה) also bears resemblance to an Aramaic word for "snake" (Old Aramaic language חוה; Aramaic חִוְיָא). The origin for this etymological hypothesis is the rabbinic pun present in Genesis Rabbah 20:11, utilizing the similarity between Heb. Ḥawwāh and Aram. ḥiwyāʾ. Notwithstanding its rabbinic ideological usage, scholars like Julius Wellhausen and Theodor Nöldeke argued for its etymological relevance.

Gerda Lerner postulates that the story of Eve's creation from Adam's rib may have originated in the Mesopotamian myth of Enki and Ninhursag. In this myth, Enki eats poisonous plants that give him diseases. His consort/sister, Ninhursag, then creates several deities to cure each of these ailments. One of them, Ninti, is destined to heal Enki's rib. Ninti's name means both "the lady of the rib" and "the lady of life". This association of rib and life is similar to that found in Eve, whose name is linked to life and who was born of a rib.

== In Genesis ==
=== Creation Story ===
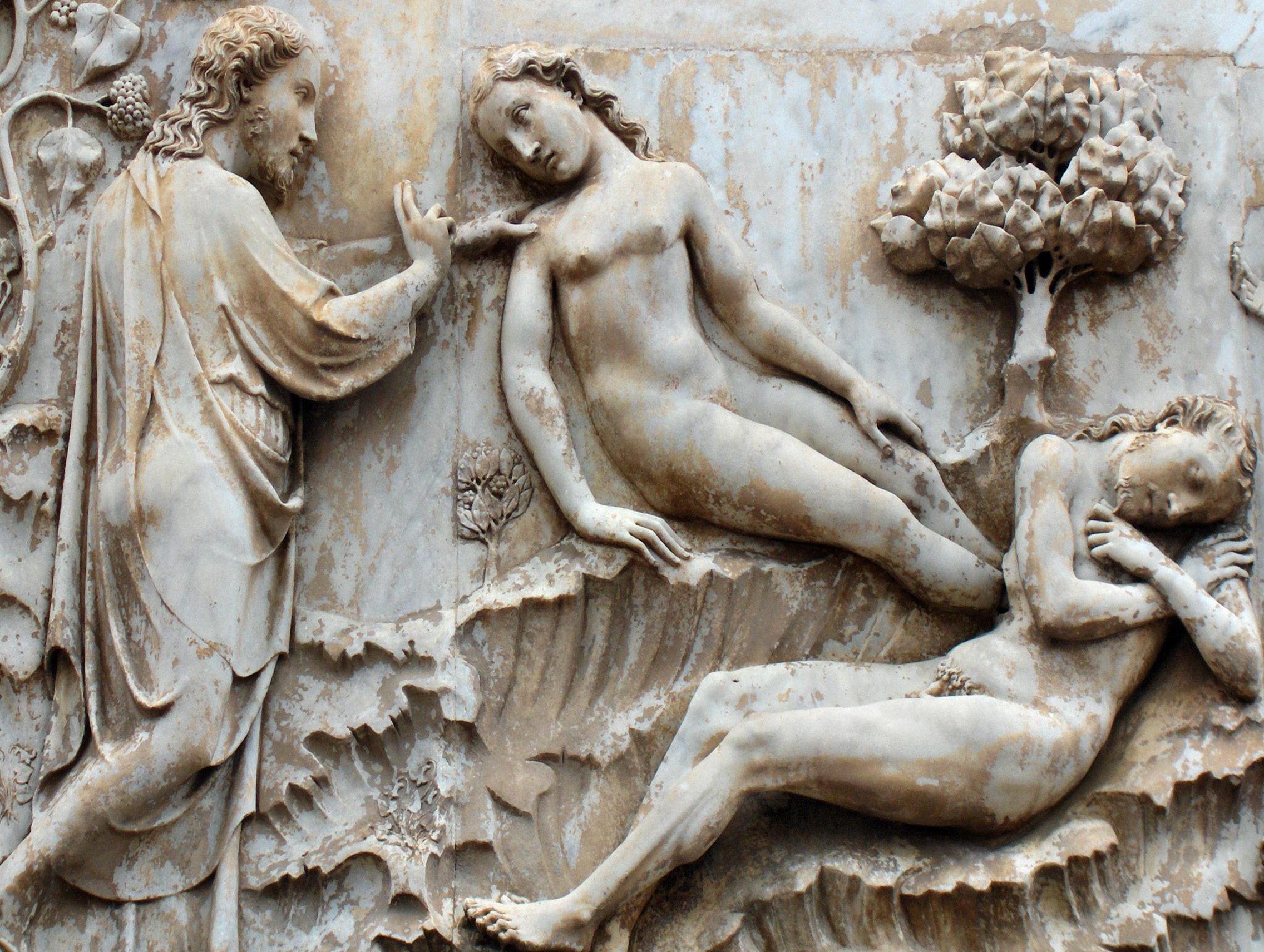
Creation of Eve, marble relief by Lorenzo Maitani on the Orvieto Cathedral, Italy

The opening two chapters of Genesis are regarded as a composite of two stories drawn from different sources expressing distinct views about the nature of God and creation. The first builds towards the creation by God (Elohim) of humankind, Hebrew adam, both male and female, although not identifying or naming individual people.

The second, starting around Gen.2:4, is about the fashioning by the LORD God (YHWH Elohim) of two individual people: a man, adam and a helper: "It is not good that the man should be alone; I will make him a help meet for him." The woman is created to be "a help meet" ezer ke-negdo (עזר כנגדו). Ke-negdo means "alongside, opposite, a counterpart to him", and ezer, help is a description of active intervention on behalf of the other person. The woman is called ishah, woman, with an explanation that this is because she was taken from ish, meaning "man". Most contemporary opinions hold that the two words are not connected. Later, after the story of the Garden of Eden is complete, she will be given a name, Ḥawwāh (Eve). This means "living" in Hebrew, from a root that can also mean "snake". A long-standing exegetical tradition holds that the use of a rib from man's side emphasizes that both man and woman have equal dignity, for woman was created from the same material as man, shaped and given life by the same processes. In fact, the word traditionally translated "rib" in English can also mean side, chamber, or beam. Rib is a pun in Sumerian, as the word "ti" means both "rib" and "life".

According to the second chapter of Genesis, Eve was created by God (Yahweh) taking a rib of Adam and creating her out of that, to be Adam's companion, which has led some people to believe that men have one less rib than women. Adam is charged with guarding and keeping the garden before her creation; she is not present when God commands Adam not to eat the forbidden fruit – although it is clear that she was aware of the command. She decides to eat the forbidden fruit from the tree of the knowledge of good and evil after she hears the serpent's argument that it would not kill her but bring her benefits. She shares the fruit with Adam, and before they could eat of the tree of life, which would bestow eternal life to the one who eats thereof, they are expelled from the Garden of Eden, with Eve herself suffering imprecations, with her being subjected to additional agony during childbirth, as well as her subjecting to her husband Adam.

Christian churches differ on how they view both Adam and Eve's disobedience to God (often called the fall of man or the Original Sin), and to the consequences that those actions had on the rest of humanity. Christian and Jewish teachings sometimes hold Adam (the first man) and Eve to different levels of responsibility for the "fall". God created Eve from ’aḥat miṣṣal‘otaiv (אַחַת מִצַּלְעֹתָיו), traditionally translated as "one of his ribs". The term can mean curve, limp, adversity and side. The traditional reading has been questioned recently by feminist theologians who suggest it should instead be rendered as "side", supporting the idea that woman is man's equal and not his subordinate. Such a reading shares elements in common with Aristophanes' story of the origin of love and the separation of the sexes in Plato's Symposium. A recent suggestion, based upon observations that men and women have the same number of ribs, speculates that the bone was the baculum, a small structure found in the penis of many mammals, but not in humans.

=== Expulsion from Eden ===
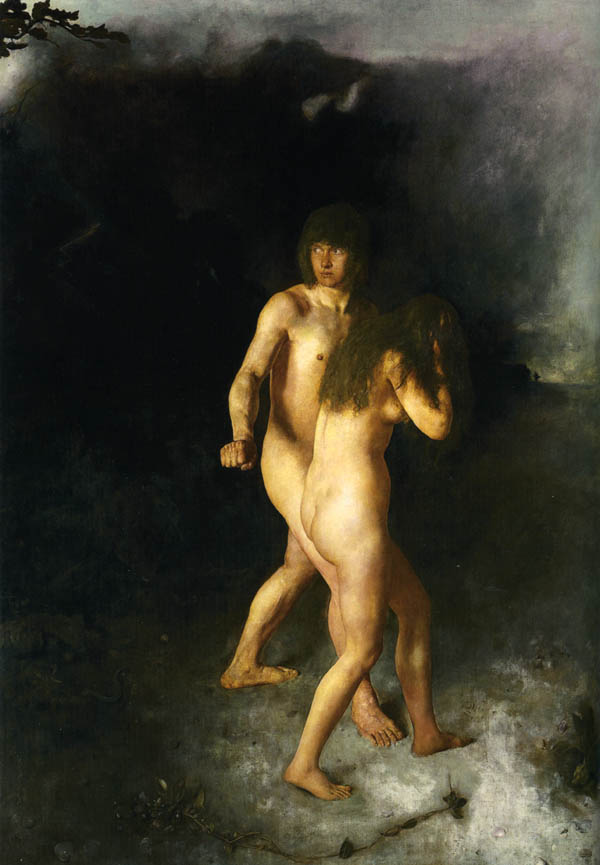
The Expulsion from Paradise by Hans Heyerdahl, 1877

Eve is found in the Genesis 3 expulsion from Eden narrative which is characterized as a parable or "wisdom tale" in the wisdom tradition. This narrative portion is attributed to Yahwist (J) by the documentary hypothesis due to the use of YHWH. In the narrative of humanity’s expulsion from Eden, a dialogue occurs between the woman and a serpent possessing legs (3:1–5). This serpent is described in 2:19 as one of the animals formed by Yahweh among the beasts of the field. The woman is willing to talk to the serpent and respond to the creature's cynicism by repeating Yahweh's prohibition from 2:17. The serpent directly disputes Yahweh's command. The woman eats from the fruit of the forbidden tree and also gives to the man who is with her and he eats. (3:6–8). Yahweh questions Adam, who blames the woman (3:9–13). Yahweh then challenges the woman to explain herself; she blames the serpent, who is cursed to crawl on its belly, so losing its limbs. Divine pronouncement of three judgments are then laid against all culprits (3:14–19). A judgement oracle and the nature of the crime is first laid upon the serpent, then the woman, and finally Adam. After the serpent is cursed by Yahweh, the woman receives a penalty that impacts two primary roles: childbearing and her subservient relationship to her husband, though the woman's desire in Genesis 3:16 is written in Septuagint as 'αποστροφή' which means 'turning away from', 'disgust', or 'repugnance', and this shows that man might be metaphorically likened to sin, considering that the terms 'turn away' and 'rule' are used in the verse. The reaction of Adam, the naming of Eve, and Yahweh making skin garments are described in a concise narrative (3:20–21). The garden account ends with an Elohim conversation, determining the couple's expulsion, and the execution of that deliberation (3:22–24).

=== Mother of humanity ===
Eve (and womankind after her) is sentenced to a life of sorrow and travail in childbirth, and to be under the power of her husband. Adam and Eve had two sons, Cain and Abel (Qayin and Heḇel קין והבל), the first a tiller of the ground, the second a keeper of sheep. In Genesis 4:1 she affirms that her son Cain was "gotten from the LORD", or "with the help of the LORD". H. E. Ryle notes that there is some obscurity about Eve's four words here (in the Hebrew: ḳânîthi îsh eth-Yahveh).

Cain murdered Abel. After this, Eve gave birth to a third son, Seth (Šet), from whom Noah (and thus the whole of modern humanity) is descended. According to Genesis, Seth was born when Adam was 130 years old: "a son in his likeness and like his image". Genesis 5:4 affirms that Adam fathered other sons and daughters after Cain, Abel, and Seth.

== In other works ==
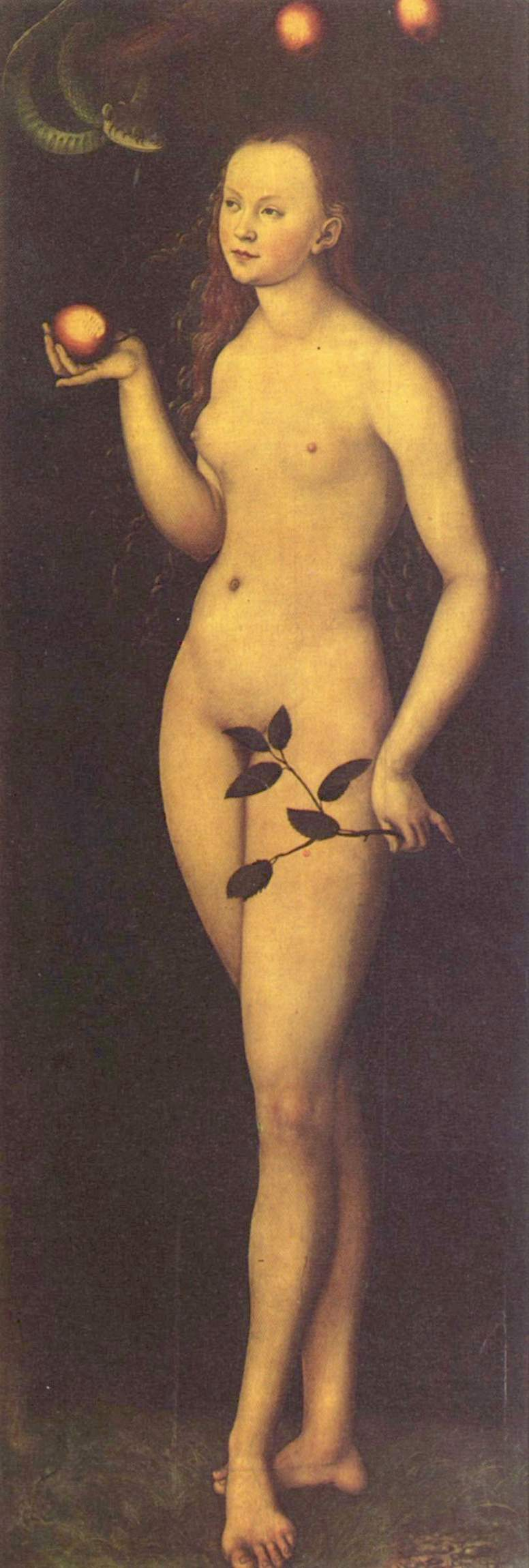
Eva by Lucas Cranach the Elder (1528)

Certain concepts such as the serpent being identified as Satan, Eve's sin being sexual temptation, or Adam's first wife being Lilith, come from literary works found in various Jewish apocrypha, but not found anywhere in the Book of Genesis or the Torah itself. She is remembered in De Mulieribus Claris, a collection of biographies of historical and mythological women by the Florentine author Giovanni Boccaccio, composed in 1361–62. It is notable as the first collection devoted exclusively to biographies of women in Western literature.

Writings dealing with these subjects are extant literature in Greek, Latin, Slavonic, Syriac, Armenian and Arabic, going back to Jewish thought of late antiquity and the Middle Ages. These influential concepts were then adopted into Christian theology, but not into modern Judaism. This marked a radical split between the two religions. Some of the oldest Jewish portions of apocrypha are called Primary Adam Literature where some works became Christianized. Examples of Christianized works is The Book of Adam and Eve, known as the Conflict of Adam and Eve with Satan, translated from the Ethiopian Ge'ez by Solomon Caesar Malan (1882) and an original Syriac work entitled Cave of Treasures which has close affinities to the Conflict as noted by August Dillmann.

- In the Jewish book The Alphabet of Ben-Sira, Eve is Adam's "second wife", where Lilith is his first. In this alternate version, which entered Europe from the East in the 6th century, it suggests that Lilith was created at the same time, from the same earth, as Adam's equal. Lilith refuses to sleep with or serve under Adam. When Adam tried to force her into the "inferior" position, she pronounced the ineffable name and flew away from Eden into the air. God sent three angels after her, who threatened to kill hundreds of her children each day if she refused to return to Adam. She refuses, leaving God to make a second wife for Adam, except this time from his rib.
- The Life of Adam and Eve, and its Greek version Apocalypse of Moses, is a group of Jewish pseudepigraphical writings that recount the lives of Adam and Eve after their expulsion from the Garden of Eden to their deaths.
- The deuterocanonical Book of Tobit affirms that Eve was given to Adam as a helper (viii, 8; Sept., viii, 6).

== Religious views ==
=== Judaism ===
The creation narrative of Genesis 1 (the Elohim account) says "male and female [Elohim] created them" (Genesis 1:27), which has been interpreted to imply simultaneous creation of the man and the woman. Conversely, the account in Genesis 2 states that YHWH created Eve from Adam's rib, because he was lonely (Genesis 2:18 ff.). Thus to resolve this apparent discrepancy, some medieval rabbis suggested that Eve from the second account, and the woman of the Elohim account, were two separate individuals: Eve and Lilith.

The creation of Eve, according to Rabbi Joshua, is that: "God deliberated from what member He would create woman, and He reasoned with Himself thus: I must not create her from Adam's head, for she would be a proud person, and hold her head high. If I create her from the eye, then she will wish to pry into all things; if from the ear, she will wish to hear all things; if from the mouth, she will talk much; if from the heart, she will envy people; if from the hand, she will desire to take all things; if from the feet, she will be a gadabout. Therefore, I will create her from the member which is hid, that is the rib, which is not even seen when man is naked."

According to the Midrash of Genesis Rabba and other later sources, either Cain had a twin sister, and Abel had two twin sisters,(Lieve M. Teugels, Eve's Children, Brill 2003, pp.47-56) or Cain had a twin sister named Lebuda, and Abel a twin sister named Qelimath. A traditional Jewish belief holds that Eve is buried in the Cave of Machpelah.

Midrash Rabbah Genesis VIII:1 interprets "male and female He created them" to mean that God originally created Adam as an androgynos. This original "Adam" was simultaneously male and female in both spirit and body; It is therefore not until later that God decides that "it is not good for this adam to be alone" (Genesis 2,18) and creates the separate beings, Adam and Eve. This promotes the idea of two people joining to achieve a union of the two separate spirits.

The early rabbinic literature contains also the traditions which portray Eve in a less positive manner. According to Genesis Rabbah 18:4 (~300-500CE), Adam quickly realizes that Eve is destined to engage in constant quarrels with him. The first woman also becomes the object of accusations ascribed to Rabbi Joshua of Siknin, according to whom Eve, despite the divine efforts, turned out to be “swelled-headed, coquette, eavesdropper, gossip, prone to jealousy, light-fingered and gadabout” (ibid. 18:2). A similar set of charges appears in Genesis Rabbah 17:8, according to which Eve's creation from Adam's rib rather than from the earth makes her inferior to Adam and never satisfied with anything. Finally, the gravest evils attributed to Eve appear in Genesis Rabbah 17:8:

Why does a man go out bareheaded while a woman goes out with her head covered? She is like one who has done wrong and is ashamed of people; therefore she goes out with her head covered. Why do they [the women] walk in front of the corpse [at a funeral]? Because they brought death into the world, they therefore walk in front of the corpse, [as it is written], “For he is borne to the grave ... and all men draw after him, as there were innumerable before him” (Job 21:32f). And why was the precept of menstruation (nidah) given to her? Because she shed the blood of Adam [by causing death], therefore was the precept of menstruation given to her. And why was the precept of “dough” (ḥalah, separating and sanctifying a small amount of dough when baking bread) given to her? Because she corrupted Adam, who was the dough of the world, therefore was the precept of dough given to her. And why was the precept of the Sabbath lights (nerot shabat) given to her? Because she extinguished the soul of Adam, therefore was the precept of the Sabbath lights given to her.

In addition to this, the early rabbinic literature contains numerous instances in which Eve is accused of various sexual transgressions. Told in Genesis 3:16 that “your desire shall be for your husband,” she is accused by the Rabbis of having an overdeveloped sexual drive (Genesis Rabbah 20:7) and constantly enticing Adam (ibid. 23:5). However, in terms of textual popularity and dissemination, the motif of Eve copulating with the primeval serpent takes priority over her other sexual transgressions. Despite rather unsettling picturesqueness of this account, it is conveyed in numerous places: Genesis Rabbah 18:6, Sotah 9b, Shabat 145b–146a and 196a, Yevamot 103b and ‘Avodah zarah 22b.

=== Christianity ===
Eve in paradise. Armenian icon, 1305. Bodleian Library

Some Early Church Fathers interpreted 2Cor.11:3 and 1Tim.2:13–14 that the Apostle Paul promoted the silence and submission of women due to Eve's deception by the serpent, her tempting Adam to eat the forbidden fruit, and transgressing by eating of the fruit herself.

Tertullian told his female listeners, in the early 2nd century, that they "are the devil's gateway", and went on to explain that all women are responsible for the death of Christ: "On account of your desert – that is, death – even the Son of God had to die." The Church Father Augustine of Hippo, in his excursuses on the fall narrative in Genesis, which led to the Catholic doctrine of original sin, blamed Adam for sin rather than Eve. His reasoning was that, because sin lies in the soul and not the body and because he understood reproductive intercourse to comprise a material (bodily) contribution from the female and a spiritual (soul) contribution from the male, then original sin could not be based upon the transgressions of Eve. Rather, her sin was both forgivable, because she was deceived by the serpent, and lacked consequences for human history, because she could not transmit sin to her descendants. Adam, on the other hand, had full knowledge of his sin and out of lust chose a life of sin with the woman over a life with God. This Augustinian teaching is also rooted in Paul: "sin entered the world through one man." (Rom 5:12). Gregory of Tours reported that in the Third Council of Mâcon (585 CE), attended by 43 bishops, one bishop maintained that "woman" could not be included under the term "man" as she were responsible for Adam's sin, and had a deficient soul. However, his case was declined and did not press the issue further.

While Adam and Eve are not called saints in ordinary reference, historical or scriptural, the Catholic Church by ancient tradition, had in the former General Roman Calendar a commemoration for Adam and Eve on 24 December since the Middle Ages. The commemoration of Adam and Eve was set on 24 December, the eve of the birth of Christ, "the Second Adam" as the Apostle Paul calls him.

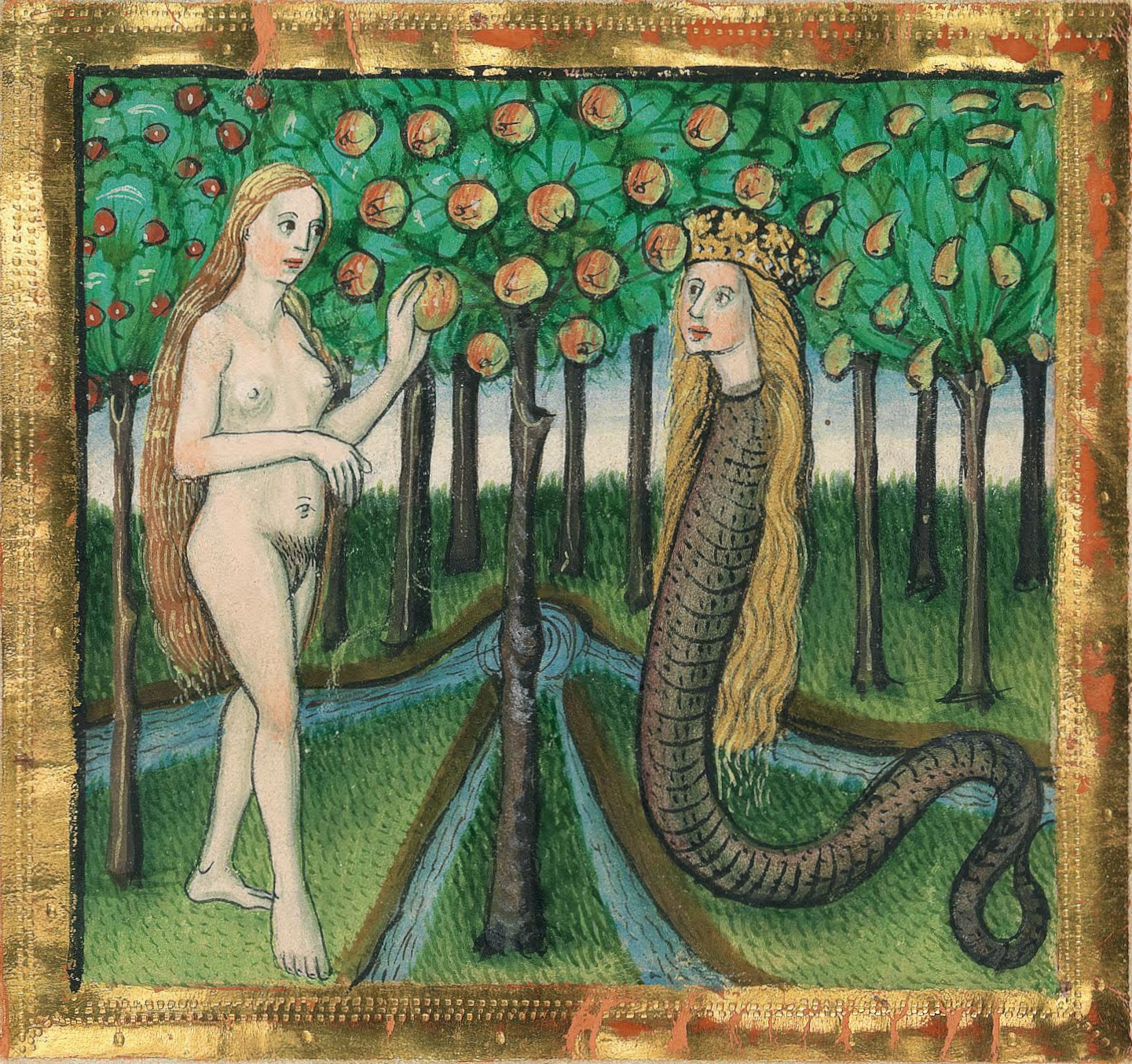
Eve confronts an Eve-like serpent, in a 15th century Old Testament illustrated by Berthold Furtmeyr

In Christian art, Eve is most commonly depicted as the temptress of Adam. During the Renaissance, artists often portrayed the serpent in the Garden as bearing a woman’s face identical to Eve's own. She is likewise compared to the figure of Pandora in Greco-Roman mythology, who was similarly held responsible for introducing evil into the world.

Some Christians claim monogamy is implied in the story of Adam and Eve as one woman is created for one man. Eve's being taken from his side implies not only her secondary role in the conjugal state (1 Corinthians 11:9), but also emphasizes the intimate union between husband and wife, and the dependence of her to him.

In Christian tradition, Eve is a prefigurement of the Virgin Mary who is also sometimes called "the Second Eve".

=== Gnosticism ===
In Gnosticism, Eve is often seen as the embodiment of the supreme feminine principle, called Barbelo. She is equated with the light-maiden of Sophia, creator of the word (Logos) of God, the thygater tou photos ("daughter of light") or simply Parthenos ("virgin"). In other texts she is equated with Zoe (Life). In other Gnostic texts, such as the Hypostasis of the Archons, the Pistis Sophia is equated with Eve's daughter, Norea, the wife of Seth.

=== Islam ===
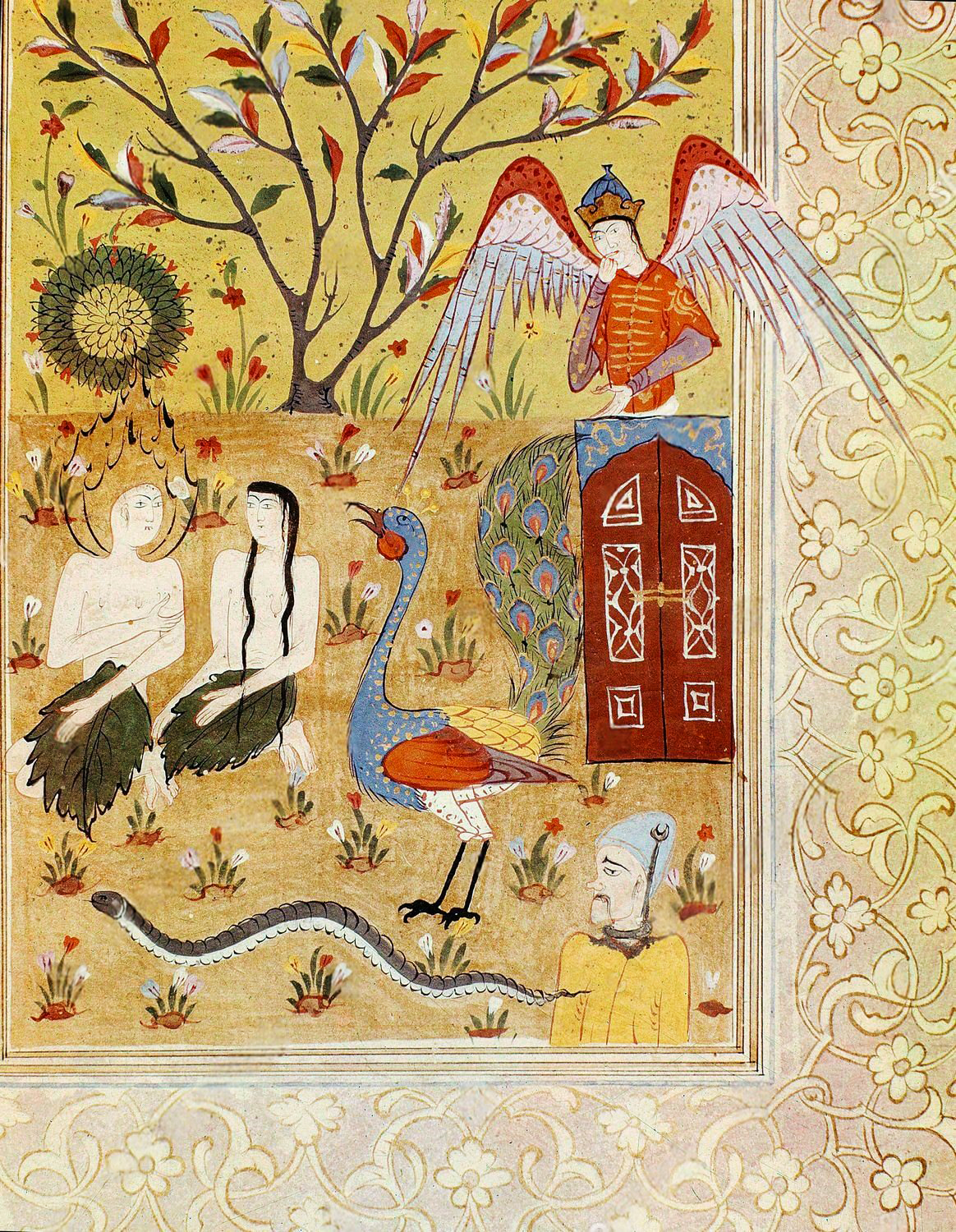
Islamic illustration of Hawwa sitting next to Adam in the Garden

Adam's spouse is mentioned in the Quran in 2:30–39, 7:11–25, 15:26–42, 17:61–65, 18:50-51, 20:110–124, and 38:71–85, but the name "Eve" (Arabic: حواء, Ḥawwā’) is never revealed or used in the Quran. Eve is mentioned by name only in hadith.

Accounts of Adam and Eve in Islamic texts, which include the Quran and the books of Sunnah, are similar but different from those of the Torah and Bible. The Quran relates an account in which God created "one soul and created from it its mate and dispersed from both of them many men and women" (Q4:1), but there are hadiths that support the creation of woman "from a rib" (Sahih Bukhari 4:55:548, Sahih Bukhari 7:62:114, Sahih Muslim 8:3467, Sahih Muslim 8:3468). Eve is not blamed for enticing Adam to eat the forbidden fruit (nor is there the concept of original sin). On the contrary, the Quran indicates that "they ate of it" and were both to blame for that transgression (Quran 20:121–122).

=== Baháʼí Faith ===
In the Baháʼí Faith, the account of Eve is described in Some Answered Questions. `Abdu'l-Bahá describes Eve as a symbol of the soul and as containing divine mysteries. The Baháʼí Faith claims the account of Eve in previous Abrahamic traditions is metaphorical.

=== Yazidism ===
The Yazidis are a Kurdish ethnoreligious group, primarily in Iraq, who are regarded as a syncretic religion, sharing elements with Iranian and Abrahamic religions. Yazidis regard Adam and Eve as the ancestors of most of humanity while also believing that Yazidis are descendents of Adam alone, tracing this story to Gnostic Christianity. According to Yazidi tradition, Adam and Eve each placed their own "seed" in a jar, to determine who is the true origin of life; Eve's jar was corrupted while Adam's jar contained Shahid bin-Jarr, his son. Yazidi tradition regards the Yazidi people as descendents of this son, Shahid.

== Historicity ==
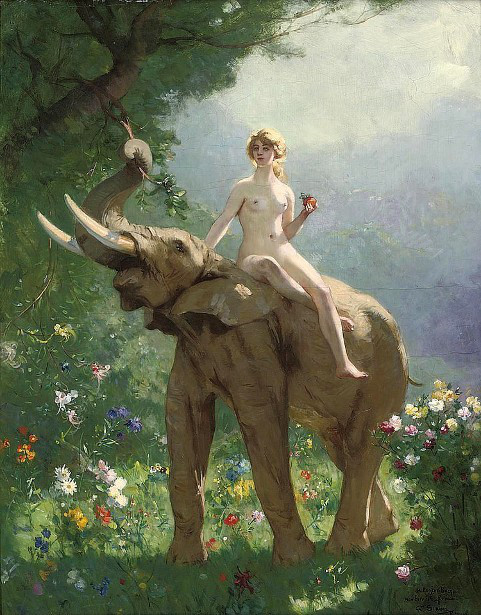
Eve In Eden, 19th century painting by Gustave Surand

While a traditional view was that the Book of Genesis was authored by Moses and has been considered historical and metaphorical, modern scholars consider the Genesis creation narrative as one of various ancient origin myths.

Analysis like the documentary hypothesis also suggests that the text is a result of the compilation of multiple previous traditions, explaining apparent contradictions. Other stories of the same canonical book, like the Genesis flood narrative, are also understood as having been influenced by older literature, with parallels in the older Epic of Gilgamesh.

Modern-age Jewish interpretations tend to view the creation story of the Book of Genesis as an allegory of scientific descriptions told in a way that could be understood even in before science developed.

Polygenesis, the belief that humanity was descended from multiple couplings rather than Adam and Eve alone, enjoyed a brief tenure as a major scientific alternative to the Genesis myth until scientific developments in paleontology, biology, genetics and other disciplines established that humans, and all other living things, share a common ancestor and evolved through natural processes over billions of years to diversify into the life forms known today.

These most recent common ancestors of humans, when traced back using the Y-chromosome for the male lineage and mitochondrial DNA for the female lineage, are commonly called the Y-chromosomal Adam and Mitochondrial Eve, respectively. These do not fork from a single couple at the same epoch even if the names were borrowed from the Tanakh.

== Literature ==
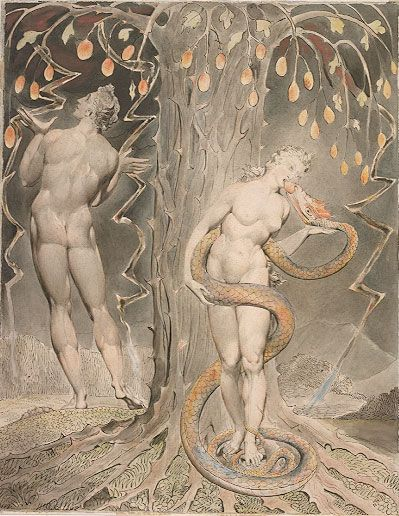
Adam and Eve by William Blake (1808)

=== Milton's Eve ===
Eve’s character in John Milton’s famous epic poem, Paradise Lost, originally published in 1667, is based on Eve from the Genesis account of creation in the Hebrew Bible. In Paradise Lost, Milton’s Eve recalls her creation in Book IV, where she finds herself alone, drawn to her own reflection. However, she is led by a voice to Adam, and while she prefers to return and admire her image, she chooses to remain with her counterpart.

The creation of Eve is also mentioned in Book VII, when Adam requests a suitable companion from God to accompany him in the Garden of Eden. Like the Genesis story (Genesis 2:4-25), Eve was formed from Adam’s rib to become his help meet. While her creation story is similar to that of her biblical character, Milton’s Eve illustrates a more complex view, battling between autonomy and unity with Adam. According to the scholar Shari Zimmerman, Eve’s gripping reaction to her reflection in Milton’s epic symbolizes “primary narcissism,” illustrating her struggle to secure her own identity. In addition, writer N.K. Sugimura explains that various critics, as well as Milton’s eighteenth-century readers, debate whether Eve’s fascination with her reflection is based on vanity-related narcissism or wonder.

== Gallery ==
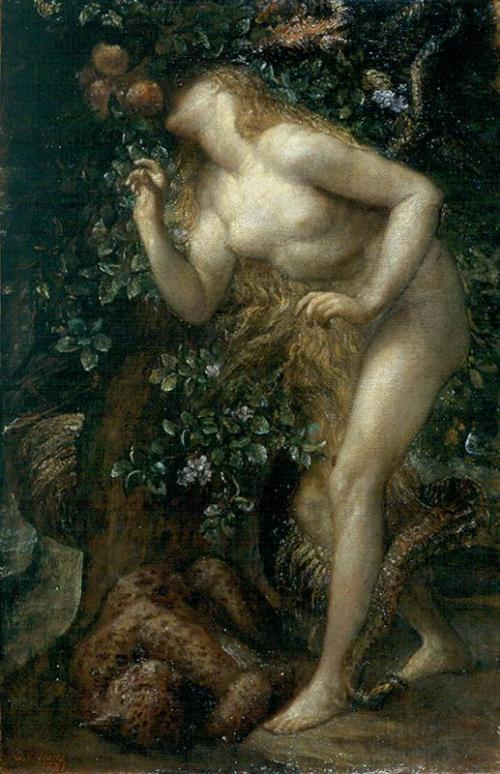
Eve Tempted by George Frederick Watts (1881)

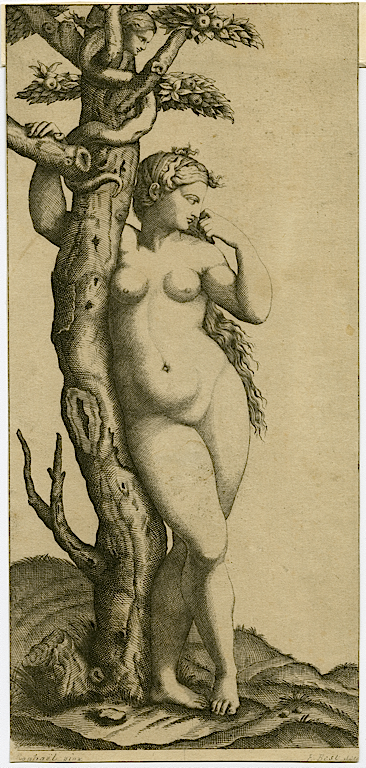
F. Best after Marcantonio Raimondi, Adam and Eve, 19th century, engraving, Department of Image Collections, National Gallery of Art Library, Washington, DCFile:Michiel Coxie - Original Sin - WGA05581.jpgOriginal Sin, by Michiel Coxie

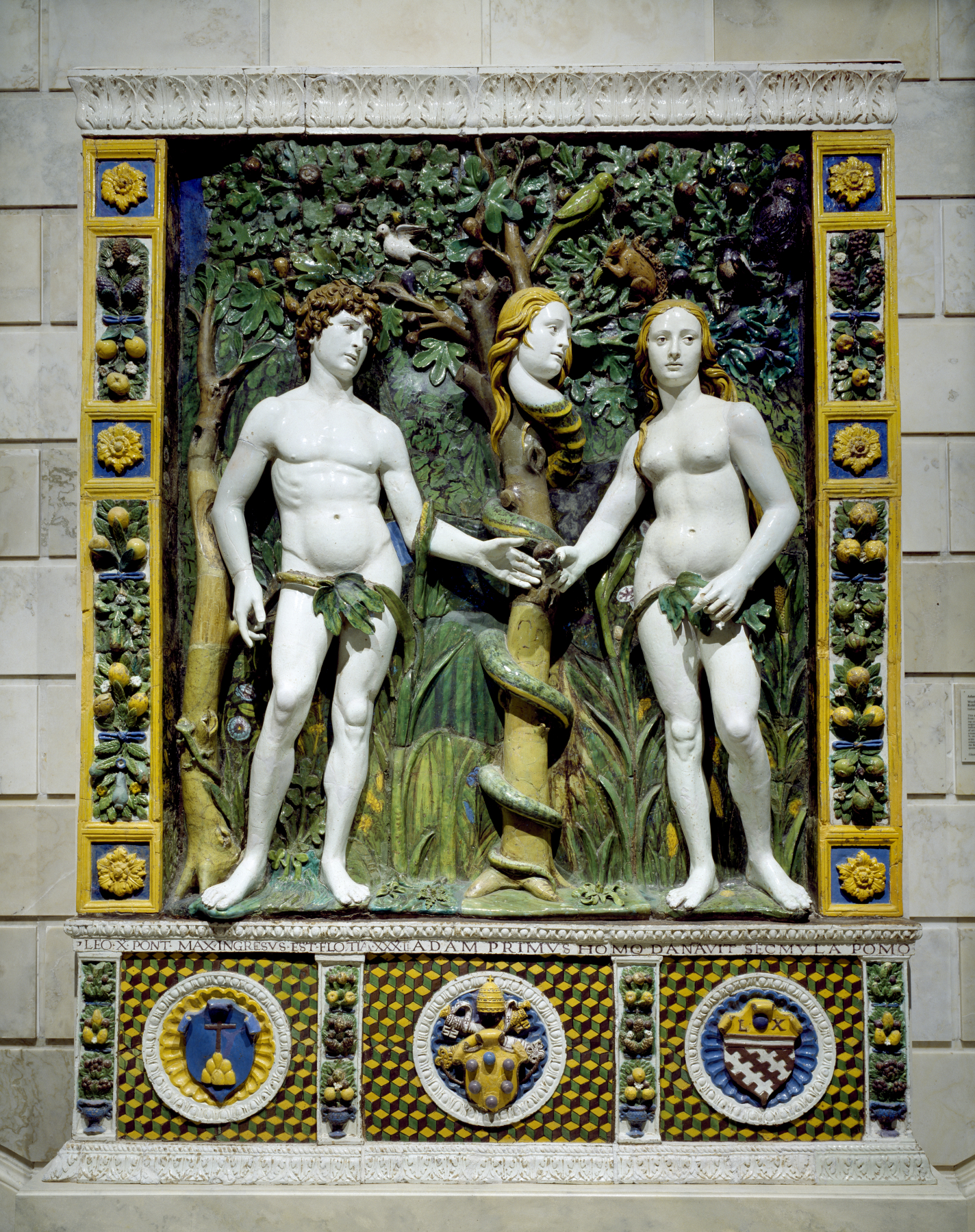
The snake in this piece, by the Workshop of Giovanni della Robbia, has a woman's face that resembles Eve's.

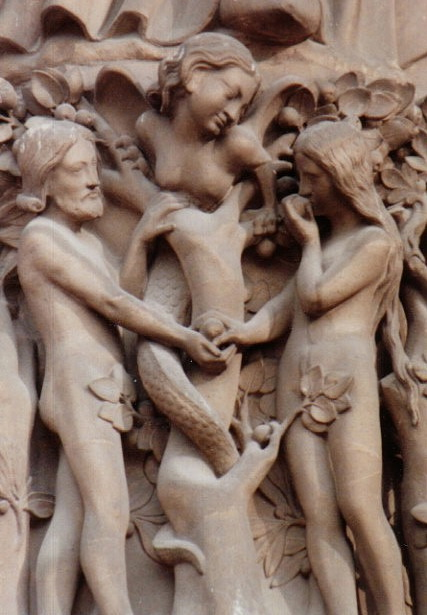
Adam, Eve, and the (female) serpent at the entrance to Notre Dame Cathedral in Paris, France, is the portrayal of the image of the serpent as a mirror of Eve was common in earlier iconography as a result of the identification of women as the source of human original sin.

== Family tree of Adam and Eve ==
Adam (Note: Genesis 4:1)	Eve
Cain	Abel (Note: Genesis 4:2)	Seth (Note: Genesis 4:25; 5:3)
Enoch (Note: Genesis 4:17)	Enos (Note: Genesis 4:26; 5:6–7)
Irad (Note: Genesis 4:18)	Kenan (Note: Genesis 5:9–10)
Mehujael	Mahalalel (Note: Genesis 5:12–13)
Methushael	Jared (Note: Genesis 5:15–16)
Adah (Note: Genesis 4:19)	Lamech	Zillah	Enoch (Note: Genesis 5:18–19)
Jabal (Note: Genesis 4:20)	Jubal (Note: Genesis 4:21)	Tubal-Cain (Note: Genesis 4:22)	Naamah	Methuselah (Note: Genesis 5:21–22)
Lamech (Note: Genesis 5:25–26)
Noah (Note: Genesis 5:28–30)
Shem (Note: Genesis 5:32)	Ham	Japheth

== See also ==
- Adam and Eve in Mormonism
- Hebat
- Mitochondrial Eve
- Old Testament Pseudepigrapha:
  - Apocalypse of Adam
  - Books of Adam
  - Conflict of Adam and Eve with Satan
  - Life of Adam and Eve
  - Testament of Adam
- Ophidiophilia
- Paradise Lost
- Pre-Adamite
- Shatarupa
- Tomb of Eve
