= Tubal-cain =

Biblical figure

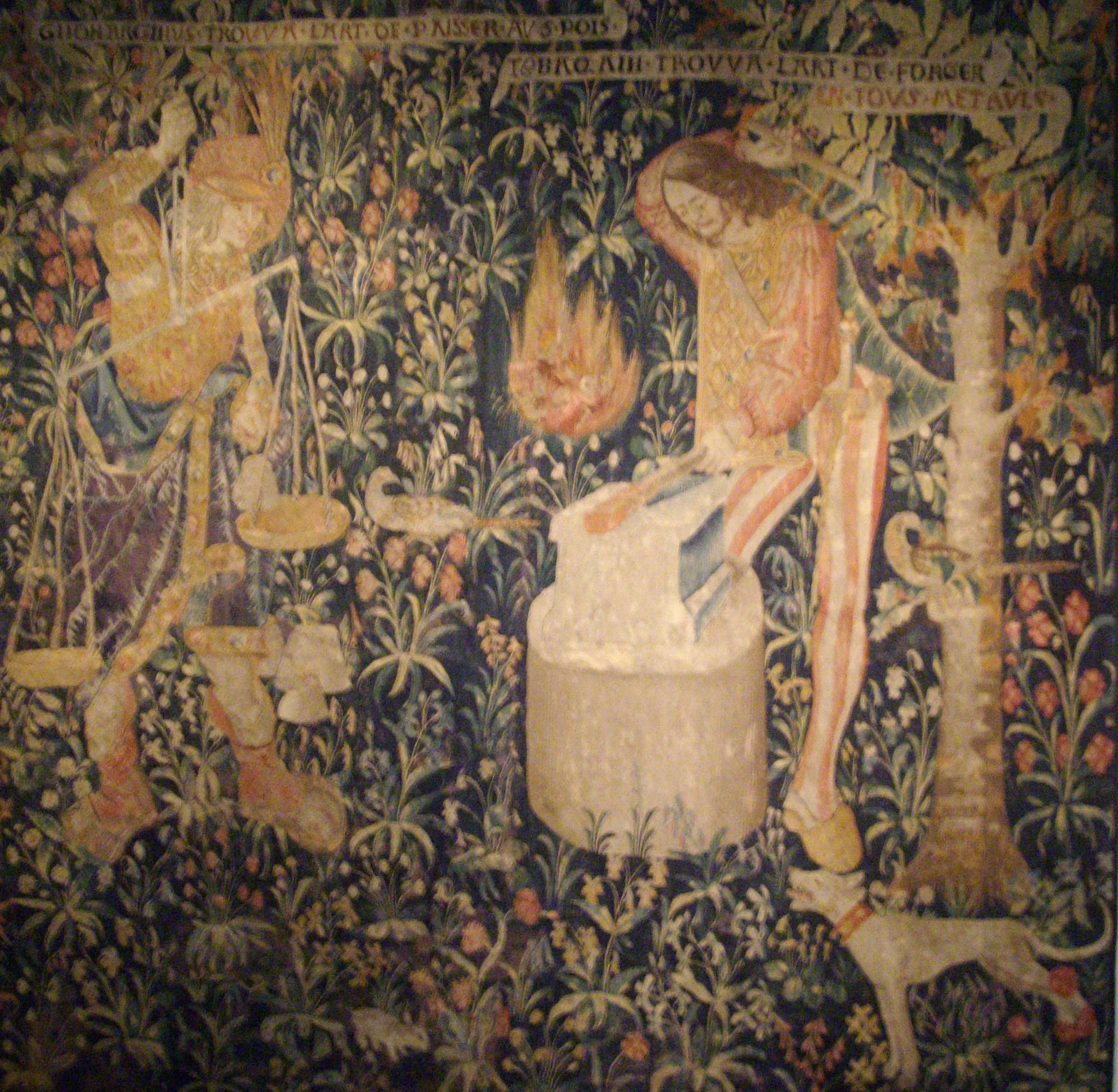
- Tubal-cain in his forge. Tapestry, Musée de Cluny – Musée national du Moyen Âge
- Born: Tubal-cain
- Other names: Tubal-Cain, Tubalcain, Tubal (simplified name)
- Occupation: Smith
- Known for: Forefather of smiths
- Title: "An instructor of every craftsman in bronze and iron"
- Parent(s): Lamech and Zillah
- Relatives: Naamah (sister); Jabal (half-brother); Jubal (half-brother); Adah (step-mother); Methushael (grandfather); Mehujael (great-grandfather); Irad (great-great-grandfather); Enoch (great-great-great-grandfather); Cain (great-great-great-great-grandfather); Adam and Eve (great-great-great-great-great-grandparents); Abel (great-great-great-great-granduncle); Seth (great-great-great-great-granduncle); Enoch (fifth cousin)

Tubal-cain or Tubalcain (Hebrew: תּוּבַל קַיִן – Tūḇal Qayīn) is a person mentioned in the Bible, in Genesis 4:22, named therein as the first blacksmith. He is stated as the "forger of all instruments of bronze and iron". A descendant of Cain, he was the son of Lamech and Zillah. Tubal-cain was the brother of Naamah and half-brother of Jabal and Jubal.

== Jewish narrative ==
According to Rashi, Tubal-cain's name literally means "spice of Cain"—deriving tū́ḇal (תובל) from the Hebrew tū́ḇlin (תבלין) "spices"—because "he seasoned and improved the work of Cain." In other words, because he was a blacksmith, who helped to make weapons which could be used to kill more efficiently, he invokes his ancestor Cain's sin of murder.

According to Tanhuma bar Abba, one day Tubal-cain and his father Lamech were hunting together, Tubal-cain helping for his blind father. In the distance Lamech saw his own grandfather Cain, but took him for an animal. Tubal-cain permitted Lamech to shoot and kill Cain. When Lamech realized what he had done, he threw his hands up in a fit of mourning, accidentally killing his son Tubal-cain. Genesis Rabbah, however, disagrees with this narrative.

In Antiquities of the Jews, Josephus says that "Tubal exceeded all men in strength, and was very expert and famous in martial performances, ... and first of all invented the art of working brass."

== Christian narrative ==
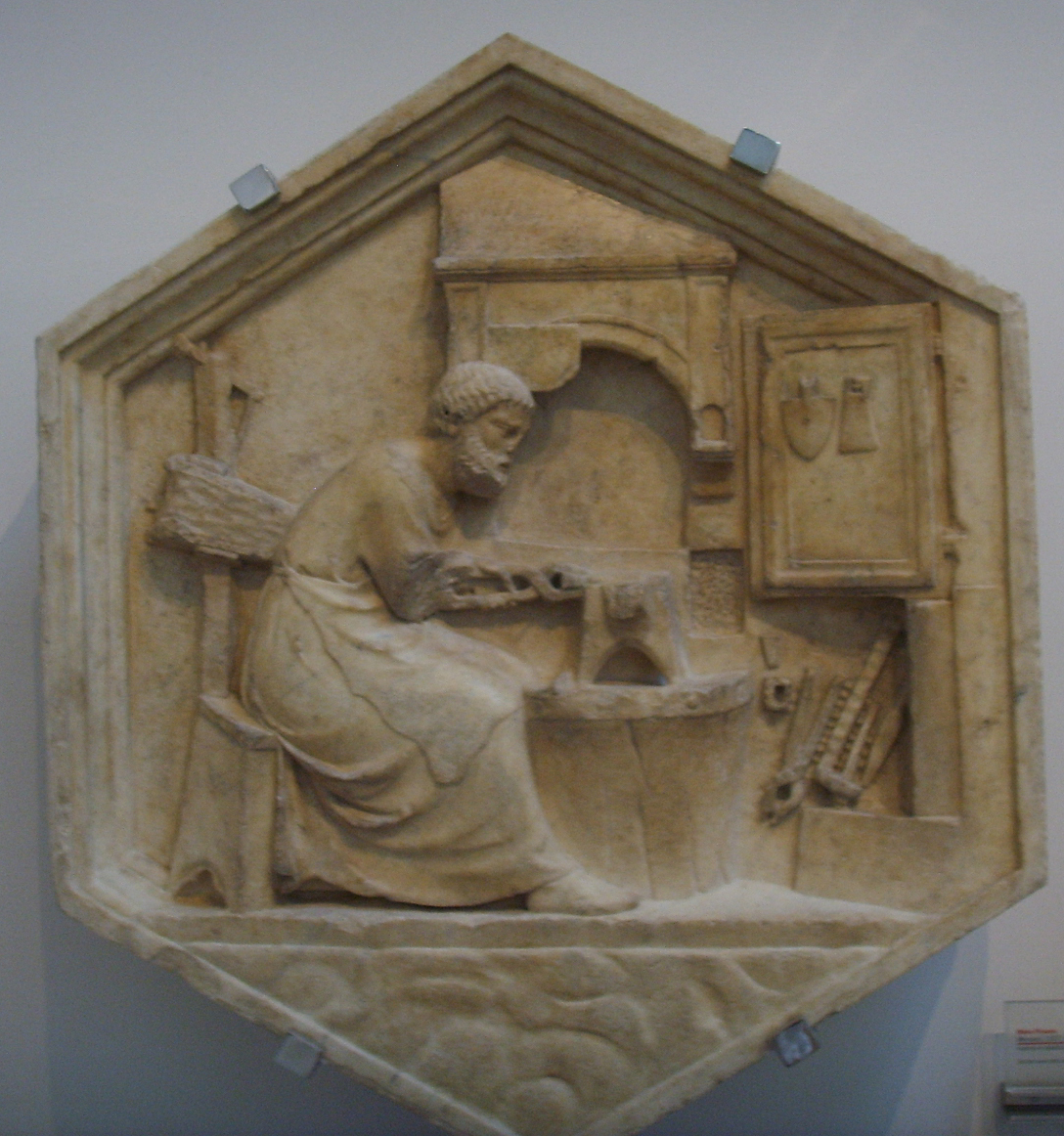
Tubal-cain at his forge, by Andrea Pisano, 1334–1336

In the King James Version, his name is rendered as Tubalcain. In the New International Version and the English Standard Version, it is Tubal-cain; the Latin Vulgate renders him as Thubalcain. It is not clear why he has a double-barreled first name. Gordon Wenham suggests that the name Cain means smith (which would anticipate the remarks about his metalworking skill), or that he is called Tubal Cain in order to distinguish him from the other Tubal, the son of Japheth. Richard Coggins suggests it "may be a variant of the same tradition which lists Tubal in the table of nations" at Gen 10, as a land well known for metalwork.

Genesis 4:22 says that Tubal-cain was the "forger of all instruments of bronze and iron" (ESV) or an "instructor of every artificer in brass and iron" (KJV). Although this may mean he was a metalsmith, a comparison with verses 20 and 21 suggests that he may have been the very first artificer in brass and iron. T. C. Mitchell suggests that he "discovered the possibilities of cold forging native copper and meteoric iron." Tubal-cain has even been described as the first chemist. Walter Elwell suggests that his invention of superior weapons may have been the motivation for Lamech's interest in avenging blood. Alternatively, E. E. Kellett suggests that Tubal-cain may have been a miner.

== Popular culture ==
A fictionalized version of Tubal-cain serves as the primary antagonist in the 2014 film Noah, also depicted as a master metalworker, and a nemesis of Noah. The character's younger version is played by Finn Wittrock and the older version is played by Ray Winstone.

Tubalcain Alhambra is one of the antagonists in the Japanese manga Hellsing.

Tuval village, a Northern Israeli kibbutz, is named after Tubal-cain.

== Family tree ==
Adam (Note: Genesis 4:1)	Eve
Cain	Abel (Note: Genesis 4:2)	Seth (Note: Genesis 4:25; 5:3)
Enoch (Note: Genesis 4:17)	Enos (Note: Genesis 4:26; 5:6–7)
Irad (Note: Genesis 4:18)	Kenan (Note: Genesis 5:9–10)
Mehujael	Mahalalel (Note: Genesis 5:12–13)
Methushael	Jared (Note: Genesis 5:15–16)
Adah (Note: Genesis 4:19)	Lamech	Zillah	Enoch (Note: Genesis 5:18–19)
Jabal (Note: Genesis 4:20)	Jubal (Note: Genesis 4:21)	Tubal-Cain (Note: Genesis 4:22)	Naamah	Methuselah (Note: Genesis 5:21–22)
Lamech (Note: Genesis 5:25–26)
Noah (Note: Genesis 5:28–30)
Shem (Note: Genesis 5:32)	Ham	Japheth
