= Mahalalel =

Patriarch named in the Hebrew Bible

- מַהֲלַלְאֵל
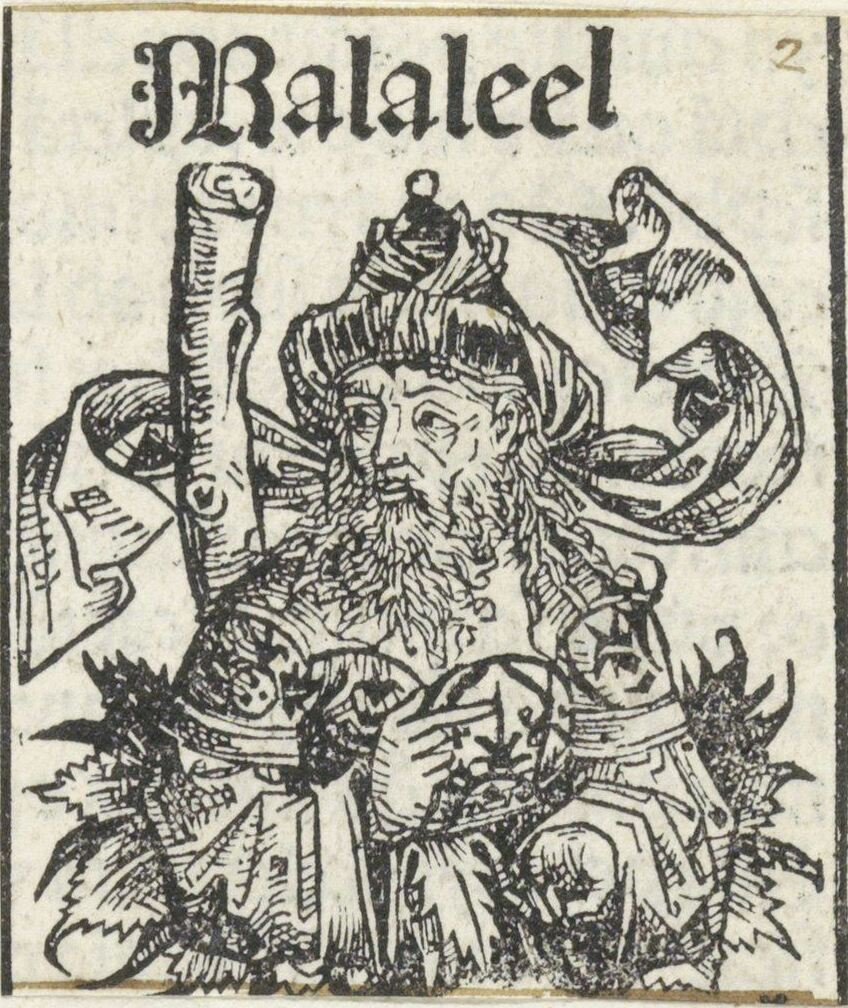
- Mahalalel as depicted in the Nuremberg Chronicle (1493 CE).
- Era: Antediluvian
- Children: Jared more sons and daughters
- Father: Kenan
- Relatives: Enos (grandfather)

Mahalalel (Hebrew: מַהֲלַלְאֵל, romanized: Mahălalʾēl, Ancient Greek: Μαλελεήλ, Maleleḗl) was an Antediluvian patriarch named in the Hebrew Bible. He is mentioned in the Sethite genealogy as the grandfather of Enoch and subsequently the ancestor of Noah.

== Etymology ==
The meaning of the name could be translated as "the shining one of El." The King James Version spells his name Mahalaleel in the Old Testament and Maleleel in the New Testament.

== Biblical narrative ==
Mahalalel was born when his father Kenan (Adam's great-grandson through Seth) was 70 years old. He was one of many children of Kenan. (Genesis 5:12-13; 1 Chronicles 1:2; Jubilees 4:14 Luke 3:37).

When he was aged 54-60, Mahalalel married Dinah, the daughter of his paternal uncle Barakiel. At the age of 65, he fathered Jared (when the Watchers "descended on the earth" as per Jubilees 4:15). He fathered many other children after that point (Genesis 5:15-16).

At the age of 227, he became a grandfather to Jared's son Enoch (Genesis 5:18), who was born through Baraka, the daughter of Mahalalel's brother Râsûjâl (Jubilees 4:16).

Sometime before he turned 292, Mahalalel explained to Enoch the first of the two dream visions the latter had, as recounted through the perspective of Enoch:

I had laid me down in the house of my grandfather Mahalalel, (when) I saw in a vision how the heaven collapsed and was borne off and fell to the earth. And when it fell to the earth I saw how the earth was swallowed up in a great abyss, and mountains were suspended on mountains, and hills sank down on hills, and high trees were rent from their stems, and hurled down and sunk in the abyss. And thereupon a word fell into my mouth, and I lifted up (my voice) to cry aloud, and said: 'The earth is destroyed.' And my grandfather Mahalalel waked me as I lay near him, and said unto me: Why dost thou cry so, my son, and why dost thou make such lamentation? And I recounted to him the whole vision which I had seen, and he said unto me: A terrible thing hast thou seen, my son, and of grave moment is thy dream-vision as to the secrets of all the sin of the earth: it must sink into the abyss and be destroyed with a great destruction. And now, my son, arise and make petition to the Lord of glory, since thou art a believer, that a remnant may remain on the earth, and that He may not destroy the whole earth. My son, from heaven all this will come upon the earth, and upon the earth there will be great destruction. After that I arose and prayed and implored and besought, and wrote down my prayer for the generations of the world...

— 1 Enoch 83: 3-10,

Roughly 300 years after this incident, Enoch was "taken up" by God (Genesis 5:23-24). At this point, Mahalalel was 592 years old.

When Mahalalel was 840, his 910-year-old father Kenan died (Genesis 5:14).

After Kenan's death, Mahalalel lived 55 more years and died at 895 (Genesis 5:17), placing him eighth in the records for the unusually long lifespans for the antediluvian patriarchs. At the time of Mahalalel's death, Noah was 234 as per the Masoretic chronology.

== Genealogy ==
Adam (Note: Genesis 4:1)	Eve
Cain	Abel (Note: Genesis 4:2)	Seth (Note: Genesis 4:25; 5:3)
Enoch (Note: Genesis 4:17)	Enos (Note: Genesis 4:26; 5:6–7)
Irad (Note: Genesis 4:18)	Kenan (Note: Genesis 5:9–10)
Mehujael	Mahalalel (Note: Genesis 5:12–13)
Methushael	Jared (Note: Genesis 5:15–16)
Adah (Note: Genesis 4:19)	Lamech	Zillah	Enoch (Note: Genesis 5:18–19)
Jabal (Note: Genesis 4:20)	Jubal (Note: Genesis 4:21)	Tubal-Cain (Note: Genesis 4:22)	Naamah	Methuselah (Note: Genesis 5:21–22)
Lamech (Note: Genesis 5:25–26)
Noah (Note: Genesis 5:28–30)
Shem (Note: Genesis 5:32)	Ham	Japheth

== In Islam ==
Mahalalel is mentioned in the various collections of tales of the prophets, which mentions him in an identical manner. Islamic scholar Tabari tells that his story was also found in Persian literature and likens him with the Pishdadian king Hushang.

== Allusions ==
=== Latter Day Saint usage ===
In the original 1835 edition of the Doctrine and Covenants, Mahalaleel was used as a code name for Algernon Sidney Gilbert.

=== Literature ===
Thomas Hardy, in his novel, The Return of the Native (1878), references Mahalaleel as one who betokened an advanced lifetime: "The number of their years may have adequately summed up Jared, Mahalaleel, and the rest of the antediluvians, but the age of a modern man is to be measured by the intensity of his history."

The pet cat that comes to the manor in the storm in Joyce Carol Oates's novel Bellefleur (1980) is named Mahalaleel.

=== Films ===
Mahalalel is named as part of the Generations of Adam by the narrator of the film Genesis: The Creation and the Flood (1994).

In the film Noah (2014), Lamech (played by Marton Csokas) remembers Mahalalel and other ancestors before conferring the Sethite birthright to the young Noah (Dakota Goyo).
