= Enos (biblical figure) =

Biblical figure

Enosh
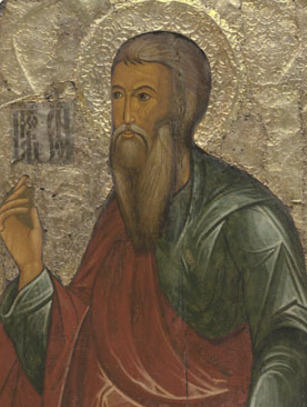
- Detail from icon of Enos, by Ždan Dementʹev (1630)
- Children: Kenan more sons and daughters
- Father: Seth

Enos or Enosh (Hebrew: אֱנוֹשׁ ʾĔnōš; "mortal man"; Arabic: أَنُوش/يَانِش, romanized: Yāniš/’Anūš; Greek: Ἐνώς Enṓs; Ge'ez: ሄኖስ Henos) is a figure in the Book of Genesis in the Hebrew Bible. He is described as the first son of Seth who figures in the Generations of Adam, and is also referred to within the genealogies of 1 Chronicles.

In the New Testament, he figures within the genealogy of Jesus as it is set out in Luke 3:38. Enos is also mentioned in Islam in the various collections of tales of the pre-Islamic prophets, which honor him in an identical manner. Furthermore, early Islamic historians like Ibn Ishaq and Ibn Hisham always included his name in the genealogy of the Islamic prophet Muhammad, (Arabic: ’Anūsh أَنُوش or: Yānish يَانِش).

== In the Hebrew Bible ==
Genesis 4:26 records that:

"And to Seth, to him also there was born a son; and he called his name Enosh; then began men to call upon the name of the Lord".

According to the Masoretic Text, Seth was 105 years old when Enos was born, while the Septuagint version states 205 years,), and adds that Seth had further sons and daughters. Enos was the grandson of Adam and Eve (Genesis 5:6–11; Luke 3:38). According to Seder Olam Rabbah, based on Jewish reckoning, he was born in AM 235. According to the Septuagint, his birth was in AM 435.

Enos was the father of Kenan, who was born when Enos was 90 years old (or 190 years, according to the Septuagint).

According to the Bible, Enos died at the age of 905, when Noah was aged 84 (as per Masoretic chronology).

== In Judaism ==
Traditional Jewish interpretation of this verse implies that it marked the beginning of idolatry, i.e. that men start dubbing "Lord" things that were mere creatures. This is because the previous generations, notably Adam, had already "begun calling upon the name of the Lord", which forces one to interpret הוחל huchal not as "began" but as the homonym "profanated". In this light, Enosh suggests the notion of a humanity (Enoshut) thinking of itself as an absolute rather than in relation to God (Enosh vs. Adam).

Maimonides wrote in Mishneh Torah Avodat Kochavim chapter 1:1–2:

During the times of Enosh, mankind made a great mistake, and the wise men of that generation gave thoughtless counsel. Enosh himself was one of those who erred. Their mistake was as follows: They said God created stars and spheres with which to control the world. He placed them on high and treated them with honor, making them servants who minister before Him. Accordingly, it is fitting to praise and glorify them and to treat them with honor. [They perceived] this to be the will of God, blessed be He, that they magnify and honor those whom He magnified and honored, just as a king desires that the servants who stand before him be honored. Indeed, doing so is an expression of honor to the king.

== In Christianity ==
Enos is included in the genealogy of Jesus, according to Luke 3:23–28.

Theologian Albert Barnes observes that the initiation of man's habit of "call[ing] upon the name of the LORD" in Genesis 4:26 was "a remarkable event". Barnes' view is that "the solemn invocation of God by his proper name in audible and social prayer and praise is the most usual meaning of the phrase now before us, and is to be adopted unless there be something in the context or the circumstances demanding another meaning. According to Matthew George Easton, the 19th-century Scottish Presbyterian preacher and author of Easton's Bible Dictionary (1893), "In his time 'men began to call upon the name of the Lord'" means either (1) then began men to call themselves by the name of the Lord (marginal reading) (Note: Adam Clarke refers to "the marginal reading, Then began men to call themselves by the name of the Lord in place of Then began men to call upon the name of the Lord.) i.e., to distinguish themselves thereby from idolaters; or (2) then men in some public and earnest way began to call upon the Lord, indicating a time of spiritual revival".

=== Ethiopian Orthodox Bible ===
According to the Book of Jubilees (4:11-13) in the Ethiopian Orthodox Bible, Enos was born in AM 235, and "began to call on the name of the Lord on the earth." He married his sister, No'am, and they had a son, Kenan, in the year 325 AM. Ethiopian Orthodox tradition considers him a "faithful and righteous servant of God", and further credits him with the introduction, following a divine revelation, of the Ge'ez alphabet in its original, consonant-only form, "as an instrument for codifying the laws".

== Latter-day Saint interpretation ==
Enos, son of Seth is mentioned both in the Bible, and in distinctive Latter Day Saint texts. The Doctrine and Covenants teaches that Enos was ordained to the priesthood at age 134. When Adam called his posterity into the land of Adam-ondi-Ahman to give them a final blessing, Enos was one of the righteous high priests in attendance. The Joseph Smith Translation, as excerpted in the Book of Moses, states that Enos led the people of God to a promised land, which he named Cainan, after his son.

Enos, son of Seth is distinct from Enos, son of Jacob, the Nephite to whom the Book of Enos is ascribed, who is the son of Jacob, son of Lehi.

== In Islam ==
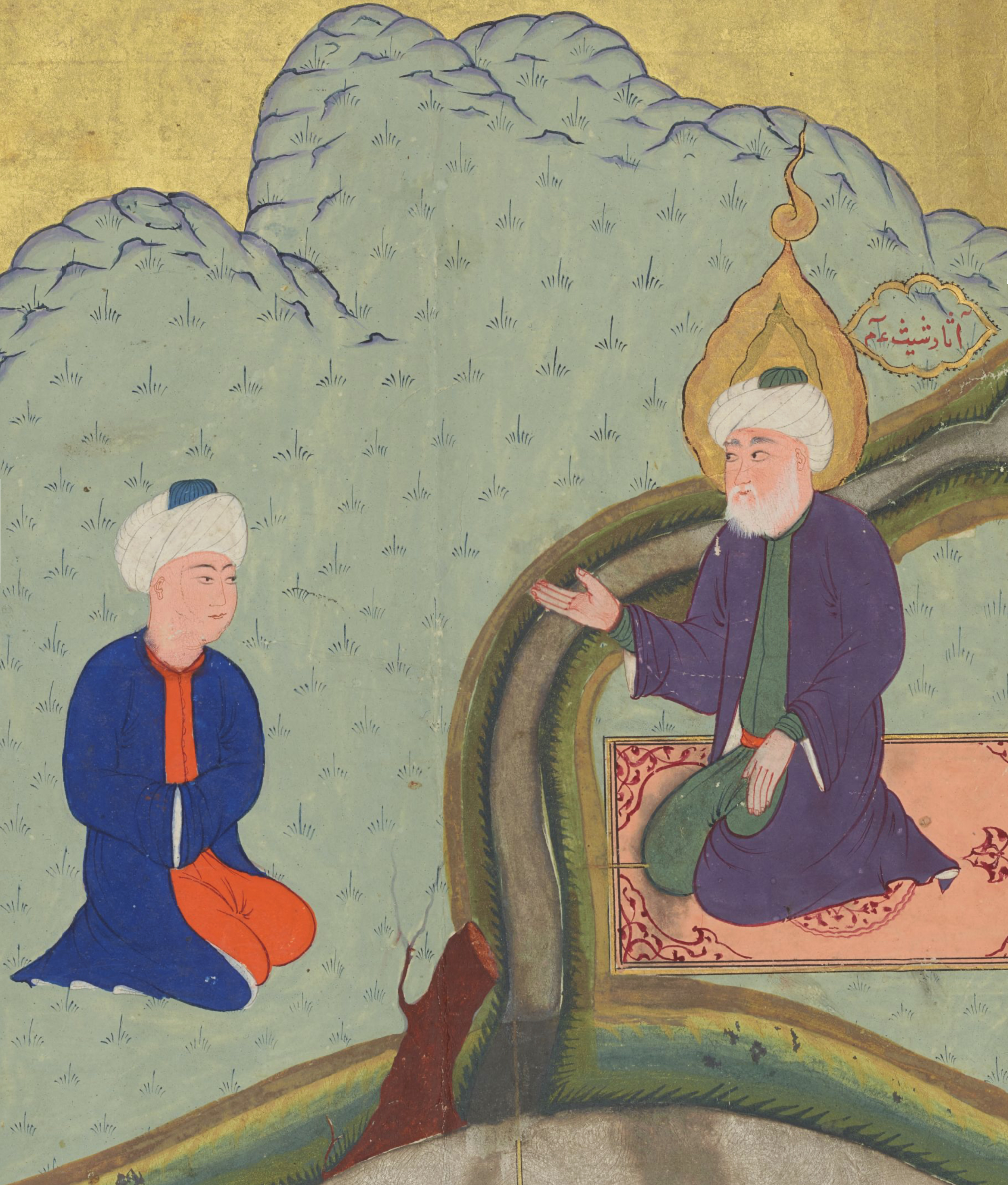
Illustration of a 1585-1590 Ottoman manuscript depicting the Islamic prophet Shith (right) teaching his son Anush.

Enos is called Anūsh (Arabic: أنوش), son of Seth, son of Adam in Islam. The Islamic tradition believes he obeyed his father, wrote the scrolls which transmit the story of Adam, and enjoined his people to proper devotion to God. It holds him as having fathered Kenan after having lived ninety years, and having taught him to pray and to safeguard Adam's corpse. He is said to have been the first to invoke the Name of the Lord, to whom God granted knowledge of the cosmos and the courses of the stars. It holds him as having lived nine hundred sixty-five years and three lunar months, dying in the third month of Tishrei.

=== Ibn Kathir ===
According to Ibn Kathir, when Adam died, his son Seth assumed the burdens of leadership after him. He is described as a prophet, according to a hadith narrated by Ibn Hibban, fifty scrolls were revealed to him. When his death approached, he bequeathed the matter to his son Anūsh, who succeeded him, and then his son Kenan followed.

== In Mandaeism ==
According to the Mandaean scriptures, including the Qulasta, the Book of John and Genzā Rabbā, Enosh is cognate with the angelic soteriological figure Anush Uthra, (Classical Mandaic: ࡀࡍࡅࡔ ࡏࡅࡕࡓࡀ, romanized: Anuš ʿUtra, sometimes translated as "Excellent Ennosh"), who is spoken of as the son or brother of Sheetil (Seth). Anush is a lightworld being (uthra) who taught John the Baptist and performed many of the same miracles within Jerusalem typically ascribed to Jesus by Christians.

== Family tree ==
According to the Book of Genesis:

Adam (Note: Genesis 4:1)	Eve
Cain	Abel (Note: Genesis 4:2)	Seth (Note: Genesis 4:25; 5:3)
Enoch (Note: Genesis 4:17)	Enos (Note: Genesis 4:26; 5:6–7)
Irad (Note: Genesis 4:18)	Kenan (Note: Genesis 5:9–10)
Mehujael	Mahalalel (Note: Genesis 5:12–13)
Methushael	Jared (Note: Genesis 5:15–16)
Adah (Note: Genesis 4:19)	Lamech	Zillah	Enoch (Note: Genesis 5:18–19)
Jabal (Note: Genesis 4:20)	Jubal (Note: Genesis 4:21)	Tubal-Cain (Note: Genesis 4:22)	Naamah	Methuselah (Note: Genesis 5:21–22)
Lamech (Note: Genesis 5:25–26)
Noah (Note: Genesis 5:28–30)
Shem (Note: Genesis 5:32)	Ham	Japheth

== See also ==
- Alulim
