= Ophidiophilia =

Attraction to snakes

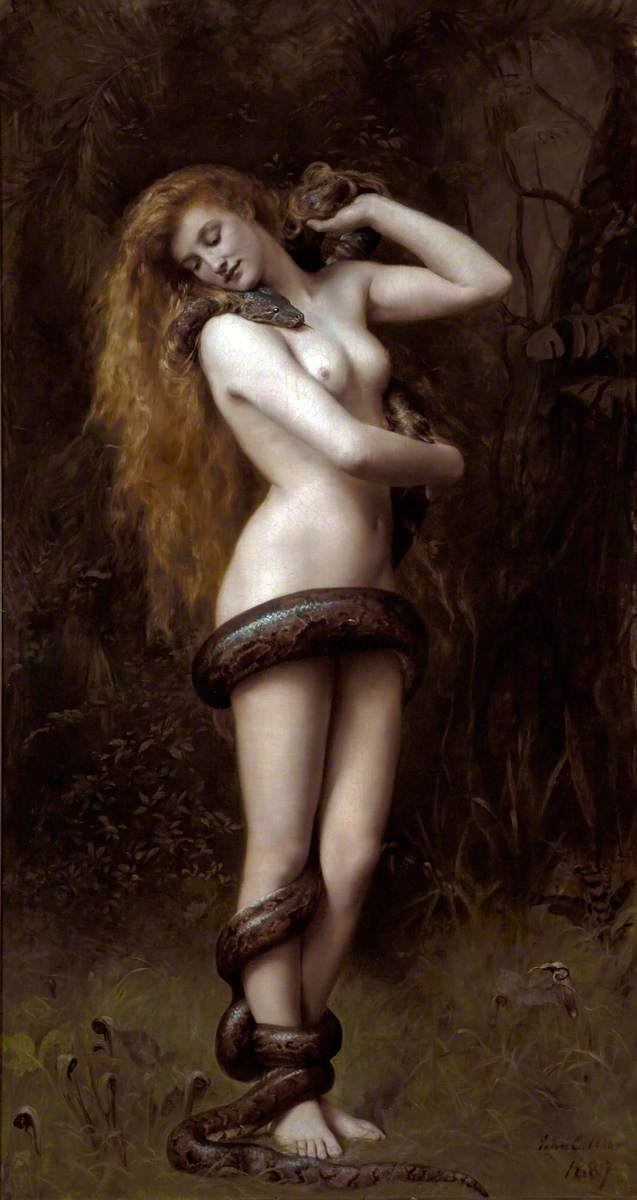
Lilith (1887) by John Collier

Ophidiophilia is an attraction to snakes; it is the opposite of ophidiophobia (the fear of snakes). People with ophidiophilia are known as ophidiophiles. Ophidiophilia is a subcategory of zoophilia, the sexual attraction to animals in general. Ophidiophilia does not always appear as sexual attraction; some ophidiophiles are attracted to snakes on a platonic (non-sexual) level.

Ophidicism (an act associated with ophidiophilia) is a sexual act in which a person inserts the tail of a snake or eel in their vagina or anus, and receives pleasure as it wriggles to get free. It can be dangerous in that some reptiles carry salmonella. Ophidicism has been documented as being practiced (as well as many other sexual acts) in Ancient Greece. Variations include inserting the animal headfirst.

The snake is an ancient symbol of fertility and sexuality.

== See also ==
- Vorarephilia
