= Tribes of Caïn =

- Origin: Switzerland
- Genres: Black metal, death metal, thrash metal
- Years active: 1999–present
- Label: Fastbeast Entertainment

Tribes of Caïn is a Swiss heavy metal band, formed in 1999, with three albums released. They cite their music as a mixture of black, death and thrash metal.

== Current members ==
- Sven Gryspeerdt – vocals
- Reto Hofstetter – guitar
- Chrigi Sennhauser – guitar
- Dario Stutz – bass
- Dave Schlumpf – drums

== Discography ==
- The First Born (2003)
- Supra Absurdum (2004)
- Retaliation (2007)
