= Jared (biblical figure) =

Figure in the Book of Genesis

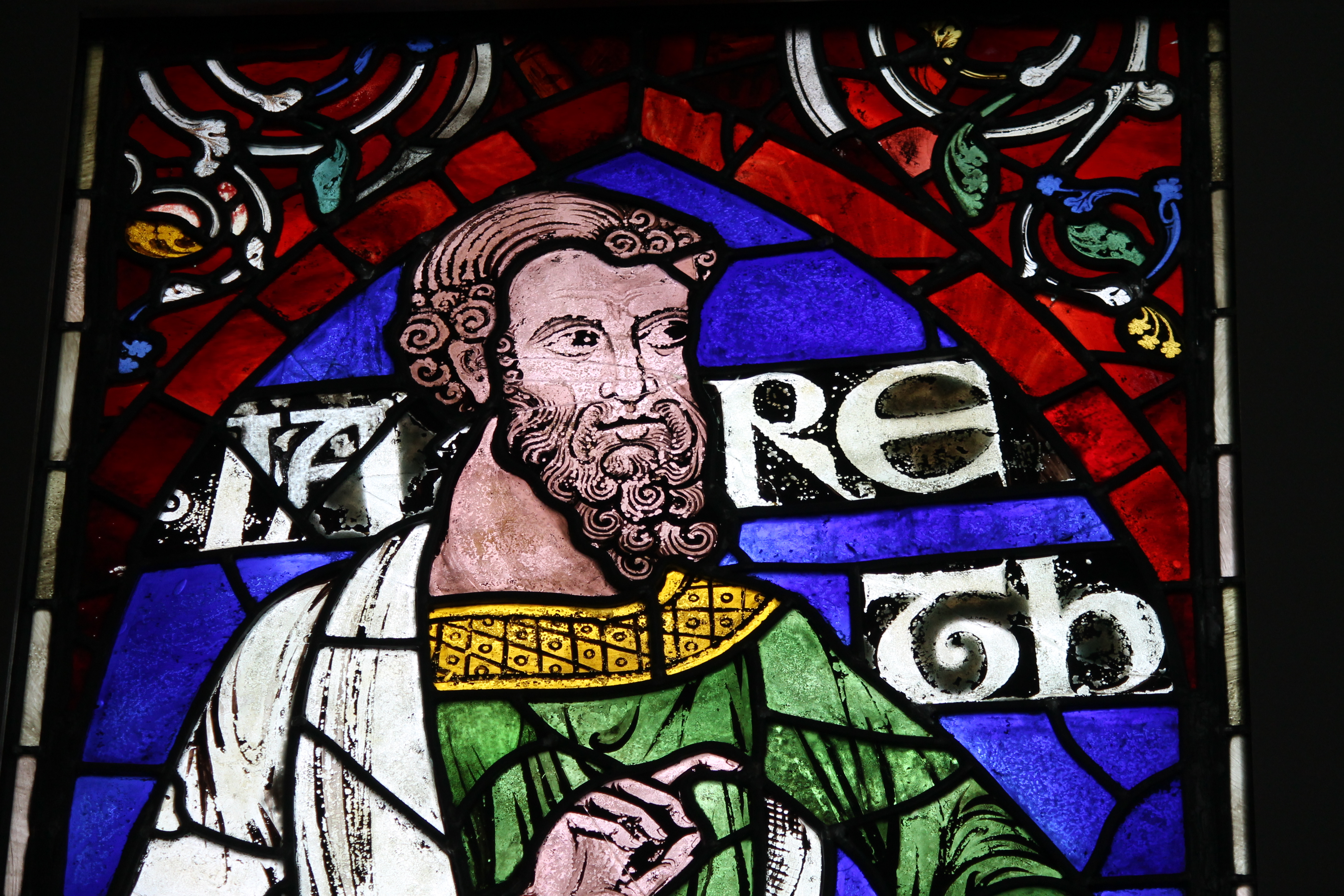
- Jared (Canterbury Cathedral, stained glass window)
- Children: Enoch and others
- Parent: Mahalalel

Jared or Jered (Hebrew: יֶרֶד Yereḏ, in pausa יָרֶד Yāreḏ, "he descends / he will descend"; Greek: Ἰάρετ or Ἰάρεδ, Iáret or Iáred; Arabic: يَارَد Yārad), in the Book of Genesis, was a sixth-generation descendant of Adam and Eve. His primary history is recounted in Genesis 5:18–20.

== Modern scholarship ==
The biblical details about Jared, like the other long-lived patriarchs, are in the book of Genesis. In terms of the documentary hypothesis, the passage about the descendants of Adam (Genesis 5:1-32) is attributed to the Priestly source. A parallel passage (Genesis 4:17-22) which contains a genealogy of the descendants of Cain, is attributed to the Jahwist, another ancient version of the same original genealogy. The two genealogies contain seven similar names, and the Jahwist's version of the genealogy has Irad in the place of Jared.

== Tradition ==
His father Mahalalel, great-grandson of Seth, son of Adam, was 65 years old when Jared was born. In the apocryphal Book of Jubilees, his mother's name is Dinah.

Jubilees states that Jared married a woman whose name is variously spelled as Bereka, Baraka, and Barakah, and the Bible speaks of Jared having become father to other sons and daughters (Genesis 5:19). Of those children, only Enoch is named specifically, born when Jared was 162 years old (Genesis 5:18, 5:22a, 5:24, Hebrews 11:5b, Jude 14–15). Enoch went on to marry Edna, according to Jubilees, and the sole named grandchild of Jared is Enoch's son Methuselah, the longest-living human mentioned in the Bible who lived 969 years.(Genesis 5:27)(Genesis 5:18, 5:21, 5:27).

Additionally, Jared was a forefather of Noah and his three sons. Jared's age was given as 962 years old when he died (when Noah was 366), making him the second-oldest person mentioned in the Hebrew Bible and the Septuagint. In the Samaritan Pentateuch, his age was 62 at fatherhood and only 847 at death, making Noah the oldest and Jared the seventh-oldest.

According to Samaritan tradition, the ancient Samaritan village of Shalem Rabbta, modern-day Salim, was founded by Jared.

== Islam ==
Jared (Yarid) is also mentioned in Islam in the Qisas Al-Anbiya, which mentions him in an identical manner.

== Family tree ==
Adam (Note: Genesis 4:1)	Eve
Cain	Abel (Note: Genesis 4:2)	Seth (Note: Genesis 4:25; 5:3)
Enoch (Note: Genesis 4:17)	Enos (Note: Genesis 4:26; 5:6–7)
Irad (Note: Genesis 4:18)	Kenan (Note: Genesis 5:9–10)
Mehujael	Mahalalel (Note: Genesis 5:12–13)
Methushael	Jared (Note: Genesis 5:15–16)
Adah (Note: Genesis 4:19)	Lamech	Zillah	Enoch (Note: Genesis 5:18–19)
Jabal (Note: Genesis 4:20)	Jubal (Note: Genesis 4:21)	Tubal-Cain (Note: Genesis 4:22)	Naamah	Methuselah (Note: Genesis 5:21–22)
Lamech (Note: Genesis 5:25–26)
Noah (Note: Genesis 5:28–30)
Shem (Note: Genesis 5:32)	Ham	Japheth

== Allusions ==
Thomas Hardy, in his novel, The Return of the Native (1878), referenced Jared as one who betokened an advanced lifetime: "The number of their years may have adequately summed up Jared, Mahalaleel, and the rest of the antediluvians, but the age of a modern man is to be measured by the intensity of his history."

== See also ==
- Biblical longevity
