= Enoch (son of Cain) =

Son of Cain in the Book of Genesis

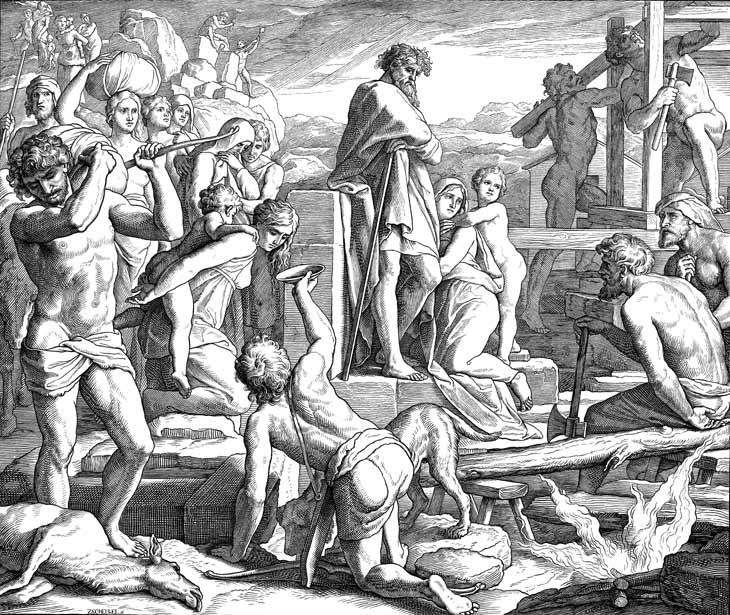
- Depiction of Cain establishing the city of Enoch, by Julius Schnorr von Carolsfeld.
- Children: Irad
- Parent: Cain

Enoch (/ˈiːnək/; Hebrew: חֲנוֹךְ; Ḥănōḵ) is a person in the Book of Genesis. He is described as a son of Cain, and father of Irad.

== Narrative ==
=== Genesis ===
After Cain arrived in the Land of Nod, to which he was banished by God as his punishment for murdering his brother Abel, his wife became pregnant and bore Cain's first child, whom he named Enoch.

This Enoch is not to be confused with Enoch, son of Jared, to whom the authorship of the Book of Enoch is ascribed.

After the birth of Enoch, the Hebrew text of Genesis 4:17 is unclear. Either Cain built a city and named it after the mighty Enoch, or else Enoch built a city.

=== Jubilees ===
The Book of Jubilees 4:9 gives additional information, giving Enoch's birth as 190–196 A.M., and the year at which the city of Enoch was built as 197 A.M. This also states that the mother of Enoch and wife of Cain was named Âwân.

== Family tree ==
Adam (Note: Genesis 4:1)	Eve
Cain	Abel (Note: Genesis 4:2)	Seth (Note: Genesis 4:25; 5:3)
Enoch (Note: Genesis 4:17)	Enos (Note: Genesis 4:26; 5:6–7)
Irad (Note: Genesis 4:18)	Kenan (Note: Genesis 5:9–10)
Mehujael	Mahalalel (Note: Genesis 5:12–13)
Methushael	Jared (Note: Genesis 5:15–16)
Adah (Note: Genesis 4:19)	Lamech	Zillah	Enoch (Note: Genesis 5:18–19)
Jabal (Note: Genesis 4:20)	Jubal (Note: Genesis 4:21)	Tubal-Cain (Note: Genesis 4:22)	Naamah	Methuselah (Note: Genesis 5:21–22)
Lamech (Note: Genesis 5:25–26)
Noah (Note: Genesis 5:28–30)
Shem (Note: Genesis 5:32)	Ham	Japheth
