= Jabal (Bible) =

Biblical figure

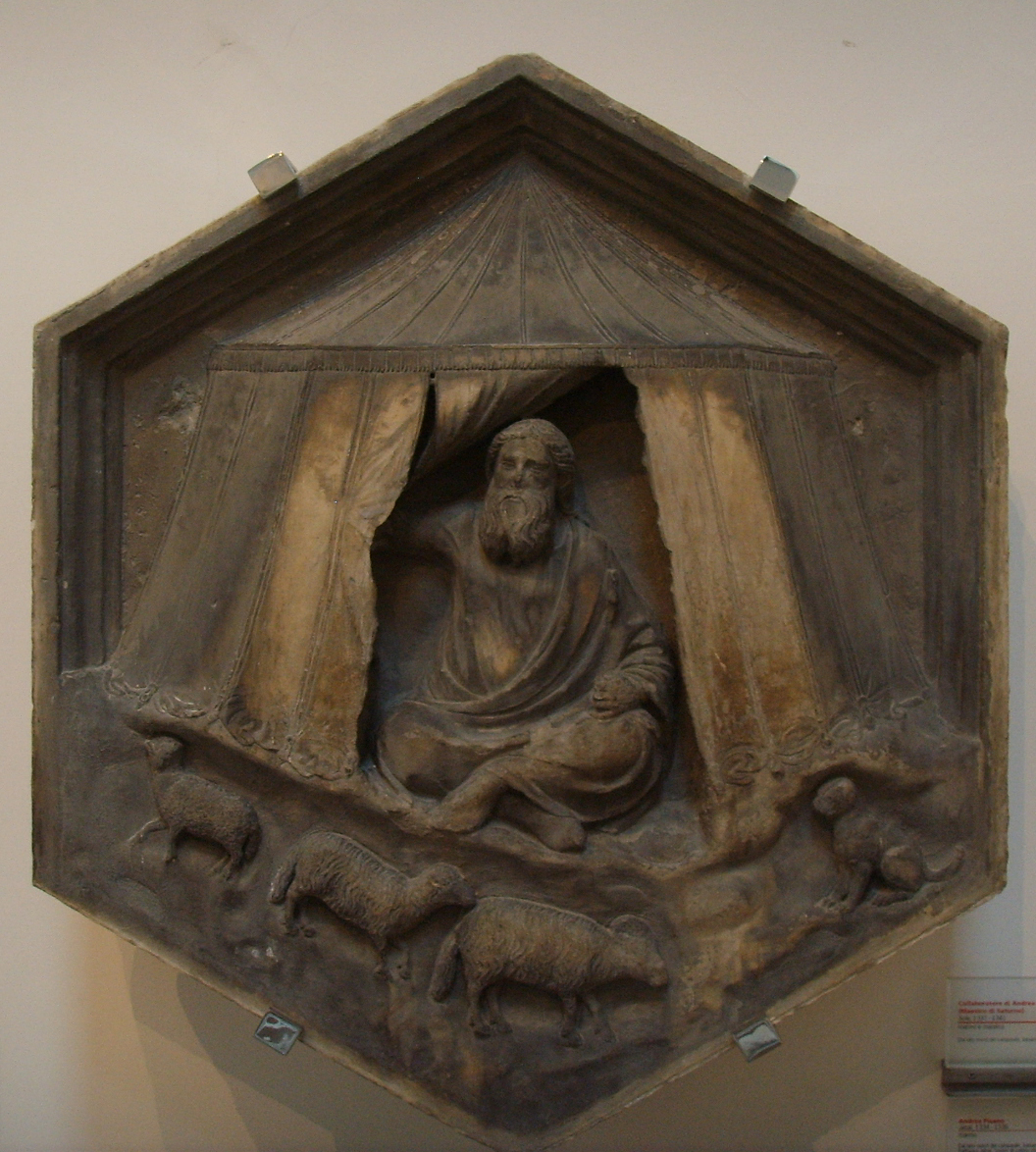
- Jabal, son of Lamech, with his sheep and a dog depicted by Andrea Pisano
- Born: Jabal
- Other name: Yabal
- Occupation: shepherd
- Known for: forefather of all shepherds
- Title: "the father of those who dwell in tents and have livestock"
- Parent(s): Lamech and Adah
- Relatives: Jubal (brother); Tubal-cain (half-brother); Naamah (half-sister); Zillah (step-mother); Methushael (grandfather); Mehujael (great-grandfather); Irad (great-great-grandfather); Enoch (great-great-great-grandfather); Cain (great-great-great-great-grandfather); Adam and Eve (great-great-great-great-great-grandparents); Abel (great-great-great-great-granduncle); Seth (great-great-great-great-granduncle); Enoch (fifth cousin)

Jabal or Yabal (Hebrew: יָבָל – Yāḇāl) is an individual mentioned in the Hebrew Bible, in Genesis 4:20. He is traditionally regarded as the archetypal nomadic herder and is associated with the origins of pastoral life.

== Family ==
Jabal (a descendant of Cain) was the son of Lamech and Adah, and the brother of Jubal, half-brother of Tubal-cain and Naamah. He is described as the "ancestor of all who live in tents and raise livestock."

== Theories ==
Francis Nigel Lee interprets Genesis 4:20 to mean that Jabal was both the "father of all cattle ranchers" and the "father of all tent-dwellers", and as such as the "pioneer of all livestock and agricultural technology" as well as the "pioneer of all architecture." Lee notes that Jabal was probably also a weaver, and thus "the pioneer of the clothing industry."

Gordon Wenham, on the other hand, understands the verse to indicate Jabal was the first "dweller with herds." That is, he was the "father of the Bedouin lifestyle." He notes that whereas Abel "merely lived off his flocks," Jabal could "trade with his beasts of burden," and that this "represents cultural advance."

== Family tree ==
Adam (Note: Genesis 4:1)	Eve
Cain	Abel (Note: Genesis 4:2)	Seth (Note: Genesis 4:25; 5:3)
Enoch (Note: Genesis 4:17)	Enos (Note: Genesis 4:26; 5:6–7)
Irad (Note: Genesis 4:18)	Kenan (Note: Genesis 5:9–10)
Mehujael	Mahalalel (Note: Genesis 5:12–13)
Methushael	Jared (Note: Genesis 5:15–16)
Adah (Note: Genesis 4:19)	Lamech	Zillah	Enoch (Note: Genesis 5:18–19)
Jabal (Note: Genesis 4:20)	Jubal (Note: Genesis 4:21)	Tubal-Cain (Note: Genesis 4:22)	Naamah	Methuselah (Note: Genesis 5:21–22)
Lamech (Note: Genesis 5:25–26)
Noah (Note: Genesis 5:28–30)
Shem (Note: Genesis 5:32)	Ham	Japheth
