= Lamech (father of Noah) =

Biblical patriarch, descendant of Seth

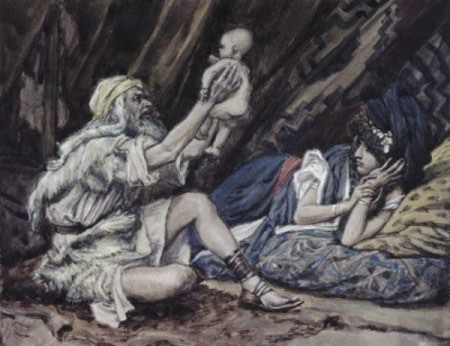
- Lamech holding the infant Noah, by James Tissot
- Children: Noah, and other unnamed sons and daughters
- Father: Methuselah

Lamech (/ˈleɪmɪk/; Hebrew: לֶמֶךְ Lemeḵ, in pausa לָמֶךְ Lāmeḵ; Greek: Λάμεχ Lámekh) was a patriarch in the genealogies of Adam in the Book of Genesis. He is part of the genealogy of Jesus in Luke 3:36.

== Bible narrative ==
And Lamech lived one hundred and eighty two years, and begat a son:

And he called his name Noah, saying, This same shall comfort us concerning our work and toil of our hands, because of the ground which the LORD hath cursed. And Lamech lived after he begat Noah five hundred ninety and five years, and begat sons and daughters:

And all the days of Lamech were seven hundred seventy and seven years: and he died.

— Genesis 5:28–31 King James Version

== Biblical genealogy ==
Lamech is the eighth-generation descendant of Adam (Genesis 5:25), the son of Methuselah, and the father of Noah (Genesis 5:29), in the genealogy of Seth in Genesis 5. In Genesis 5:12-25, Lamech was a son of Methuselah, who was a grandson of Jared, who was a grandson of Kenan descended from Adam.

Genesis 5:28–31 records that Lamech was 182 (according to the Masoretic Text; 188 according to the Septuagint) years old at the birth of Noah and lived for another 595 years, attaining an age at death of 777 years, five years before the Flood in the Masoretic chronology. With such numbers in this genealogical account, Adam would still have been alive for about the first 56 years of Lamech's life.

Adam (Note: Genesis 4:1)	Eve
Cain	Abel (Note: Genesis 4:2)	Seth (Note: Genesis 4:25; 5:3)
Enoch (Note: Genesis 4:17)	Enos (Note: Genesis 4:26; 5:6–7)
Irad (Note: Genesis 4:18)	Kenan (Note: Genesis 5:9–10)
Mehujael	Mahalalel (Note: Genesis 5:12–13)
Methushael	Jared (Note: Genesis 5:15–16)
Adah (Note: Genesis 4:19)	Lamech	Zillah	Enoch (Note: Genesis 5:18–19)
Jabal (Note: Genesis 4:20)	Jubal (Note: Genesis 4:21)	Tubal-Cain (Note: Genesis 4:22)	Naamah	Methuselah (Note: Genesis 5:21–22)
Lamech (Note: Genesis 5:25–26)
Noah (Note: Genesis 5:28–30)
Shem (Note: Genesis 5:32)	Ham	Japheth

== In Islam ==
In Islam, Lāmik (Arabic: لامك) is also mentioned in Islam in the various collections of tales of the prophets who preceded Muhammad, which mentions him in an identical manner. He is the father of the islamic prophet Nuh.

== Prophetic naming ==
When Lamech named his son Noah, he prophesied: "This [same] shall comfort us concerning our work and toil of our hands, because of the ground which the LORD hath cursed." (Genesis 5:29) The people were cumbered with the toil of cultivating a ground that had been cursed in Genesis 3:17, and they hoped for relief through Noah. Albert Barnes noted: "In stating the reason of the name, they employ a word which is connected with it only by a second remove. נוּח nûach and נחם nācham are stems not immediately connected; but they both point back to a common root נח (n-ch) signifying 'to sigh, to breathe, to rest, to lie down.'" At Noah's sacrifice in the new world after the flood, the LORD said, "I will not again curse the ground any more for man’s sake; for the imagination of man’s heart [is] evil from his youth; neither will I again smite any more every thing living, as I have done."

== Tomb ==
According to a local Afghan legend, Lamech was buried 50 km (31 mi) from Mihtarlam. Ghaznavid Sultan Mahmud of Ghazni built a tomb and gardens over the presumed burial site. Mihtarlam itself is said to be named after Lamech.
