= Kenan =

Biblical figure

- קֵינָן
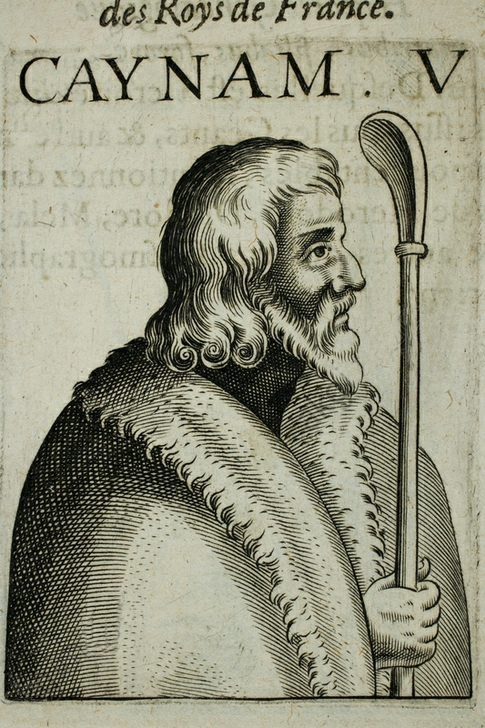
- Kenan as depicted in Jacques de Charron's Histoire universelle (1630)
- Children: Mahalalel more sons and daughters
- Parent: Enos
- Relatives: Seth (grandfather)

Kenan (also spelled Qenan, Kaynan, Caynam or Cainan) (Hebrew: קֵינָן, Modern: Qēnan, Tiberian: Qēnān; Arabic: كِنَاْنْ, romanized: Kinān; Biblical Greek: Καϊνάμ, romanized: Kaïnám) is an Antediluvian patriarch first mentioned in the Book of Genesis in the Hebrew Bible.

The Sefer ha-Yashar describes Cainan, the possessor of great astrological wisdom, which had been inscribed on tables of stone, as the son of Seth; i.e., the antediluvian Kenan grandson of Seth according to the Bible. He is revered within Islamic tradition as well.

== In scriptures ==
According to Genesis 5:9–14, Kenan was a son of Enosh and a grandson of Seth. Born when Enosh was 90 years old (3679 BC), Kenan fathered Mahalalel when he was 70 years old. Other sons and daughters were born to Kenan before he died at 910 years of age (when Noah was aged 179 as per the Masoretic chronology).

According to the Book of Jubilees, Kenan's mother was Noam, wife and sister of Enosh; and Kenan's wife, Mualeleth, was his sister.

He is also mentioned in the Genealogy of Jesus in Luke 3:36–37.

== Family tree ==
The following family tree has been constructed from a variety of biblical and extra-biblical sources:

Adam (Note: Genesis 4:1)	Eve
Cain	Abel (Note: Genesis 4:2)	Seth (Note: Genesis 4:25; 5:3)
Enoch (Note: Genesis 4:17)	Enos (Note: Genesis 4:26; 5:6–7)
Irad (Note: Genesis 4:18)	Kenan (Note: Genesis 5:9–10)
Mehujael	Mahalalel (Note: Genesis 5:12–13)
Methushael	Jared (Note: Genesis 5:15–16)
Adah (Note: Genesis 4:19)	Lamech	Zillah	Enoch (Note: Genesis 5:18–19)
Jabal (Note: Genesis 4:20)	Jubal (Note: Genesis 4:21)	Tubal-Cain (Note: Genesis 4:22)	Naamah	Methuselah (Note: Genesis 5:21–22)
Lamech (Note: Genesis 5:25–26)
Noah (Note: Genesis 5:28–30)
Shem (Note: Genesis 5:32)	Ham	Japheth

== In Islam ==
In Islam, Kinān ibn Anūsh (Arabic: قينان بن أنوش) was the son of Anūsh and possibly a prophet in islam. He is mentioned in the various collections of tales of the Islamic prophets, which honor him in an identical manner.

== Gallery ==
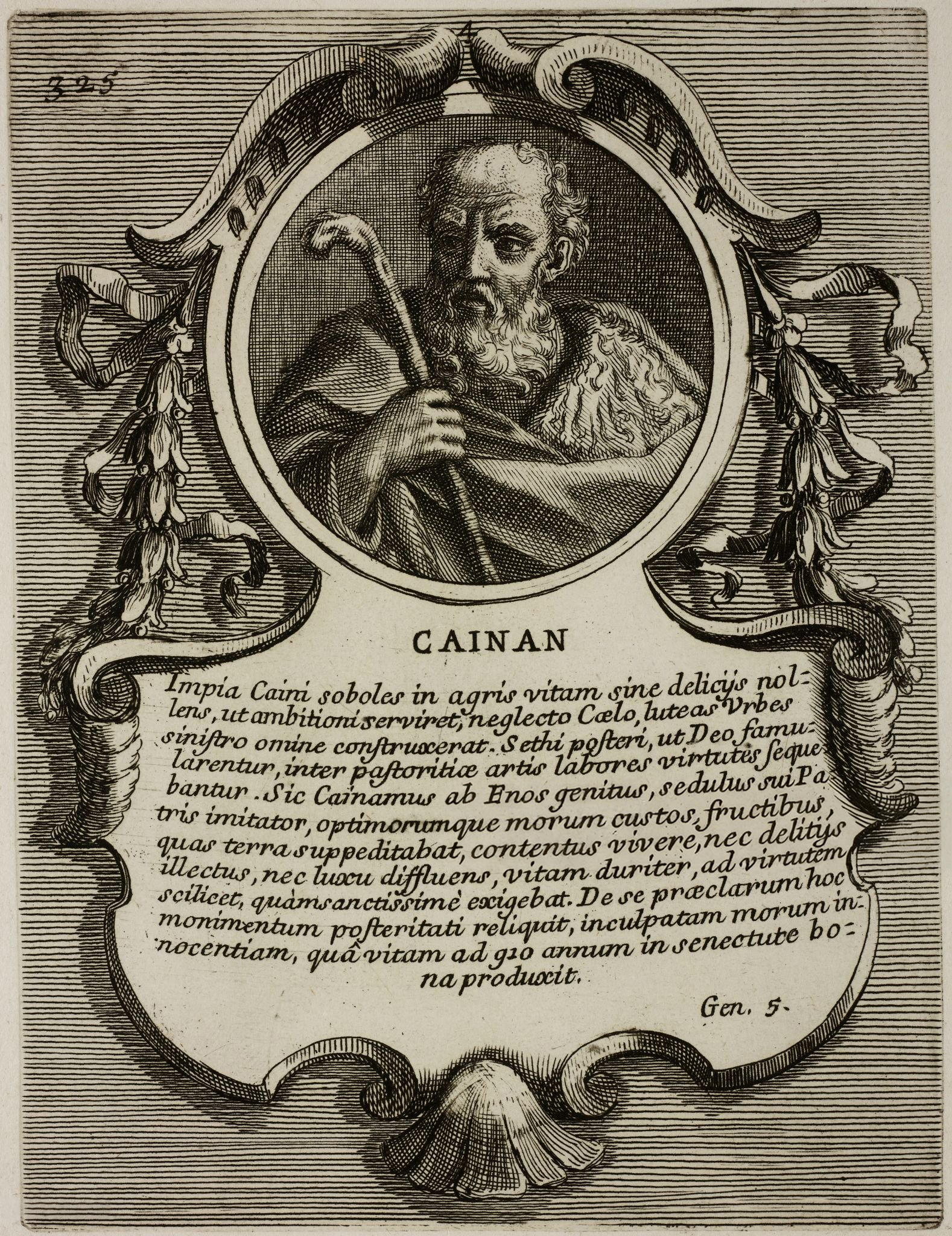
Engraving of Kenan from Bartolomeo Gai's Epitome historico-chronologica (1751)
