= Naamah (Genesis) =

Biblical figure

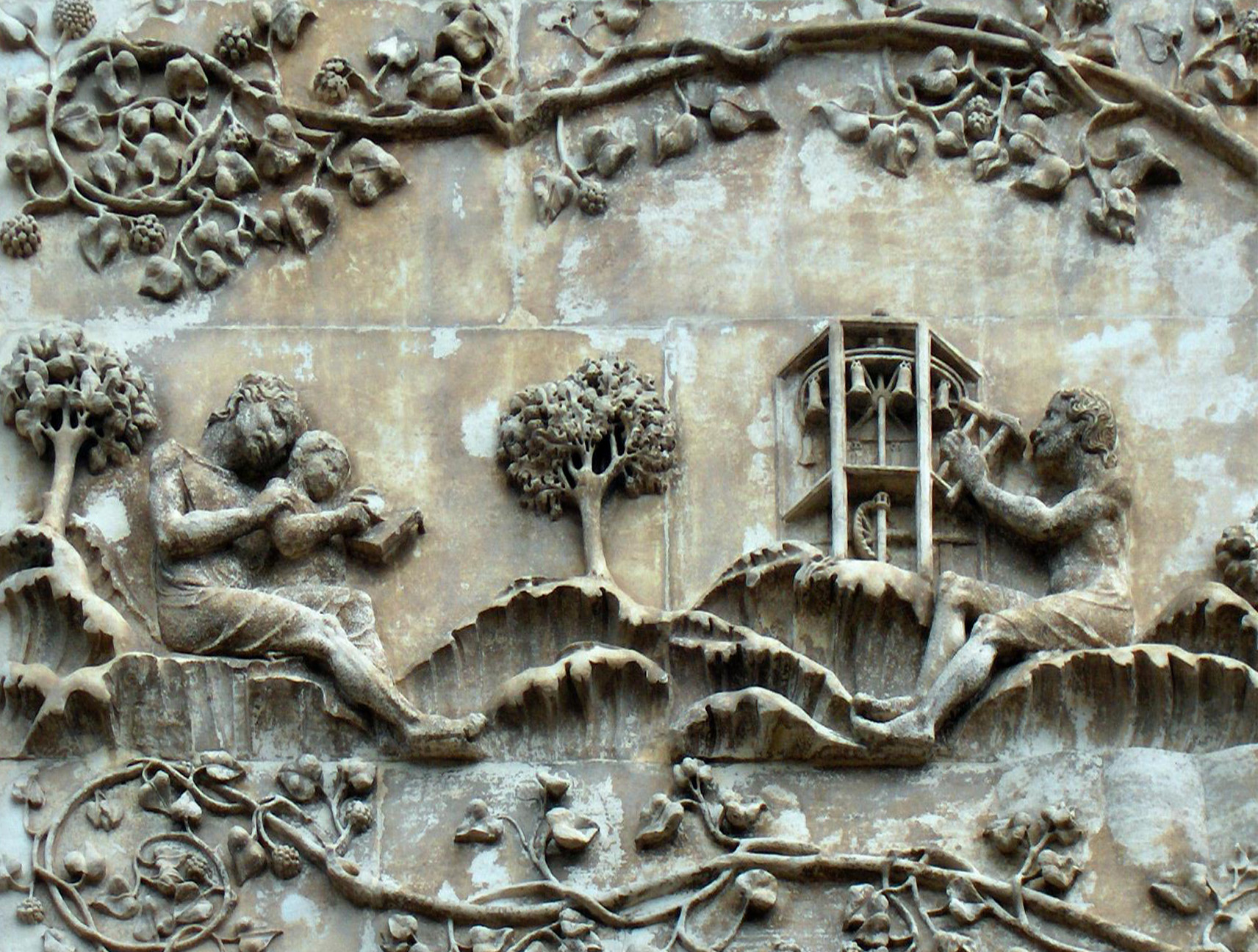
- Marble bas relief at Orvieto Cathedral depicts Naamah as a teacher of reading, while her half-brother Jubal is a father of music.
- Born: Naamah
- Other name: Naama
- Occupation: Queen of Demons (in Kabbalah)
- Known for: Sister of Tubal-Cain, Seducer of the watchers
- Spouse(s): Noah, Shamdon
- Parent(s): Lamech and Zillah maybe Enoch and Edna
- Relatives: Jabal (half-brother); Jubal (half-brother); Tubal-cain (brother)

Naamah (Hebrew: נַעֲמָה – Naʿămā, also spelled Na'ama(h), Nahema(h), Naama) is mentioned in the Bible, in Genesis 4:22, as a descendant of Cain. She was the only mentioned daughter of Lamech and Zillah and their youngest mentioned child; her brother was Tubal-cain, while Jabal and Jubal were her half-brothers, sons of Lamech's other wife Adah. She is often conflated with or connected to Naamah of the Zohar, one of the first women to seduce the grigori and give birth to nephilim.

== History ==
=== Tanakh ===
Genesis 4:22:

As for Zillah, she bore Tubal-cain, who forged all implements of copper and iron. And the sister of Tubal-cain was Naamah.

Gordon Wenham notes that the reason "she should be picked out for special mention remains obscure." At the same time, R. R. Wilson suggests that the narrator simply wished to offer a balanced genealogy by noting that both of Lamech's wives had two children.

The Naamah mentioned in the Bible is a Cainite, a descendant in the lineage of Cain (the daughter of Lamech and sister of Tubal-cain). However, a Sethite Naamah is named as the wife of Noah (see Rashi's commentary on Genesis 4:22), and a daughter of Enoch, Noah's great-grandfather, in the early Jewish midrash Genesis Rabba (23.3). Some Jewish traditions associate her with singing.

The 17th-century theologian John Gill mentioned a theory which identified Naamah instead with the name of the wife of Ham, son of Noah, who he believed may have become confused with Noah's wife. See Wives aboard the Ark.

=== Targum ===
Different books of Targum mention Na'amah's reference in the Book of Genesis. Onkelos Genesis (possibly 2nd century CE) 4:22 simply states that Tubal-Cain's sister was Na'amah, while Pseudo-Jonathan on Genesis (possibly 5th century CE) 4:22 adds that she was mistress of elegies and songs.

=== Midrash ===
Bereshit Rabbah 23:3 explains the etymology of the name Na'amah, and divides her into the sister of Tubal-Cain and the wife of Noah:

And the sister of Tubal-Cain was Na'amah. Rabbi Abba bar Kahana said: Na'amah was Noah's wife. Why was she called Na'amah? Because all of her deeds were pleasant ....The Rabbis said this is a different Na'amah. Why was she called Na'amah? Because she beat on a drum to draw people to idol worship.

Tanchuma Buber, Appendix to Chukat 1:1 connects Na'amah with the events of Genesis 6:2, where angels, seeing the beauty of mortal women, were led astray and chose their wives amongst them, which led to the creation of the Nephilim.

==== Legends of the Jews ====
The two wives of Lamech, Adah and Zillah, bore him each two children, Adah two sons, Jabal and Jubal, and Zillah a son, Tubal-cain, and a daughter, Naamah. Jabal was the first among men to erect temples to idols, and Jubal invented the music sung and played therein. Tubal-cain was rightly named, for he completed the work of his ancestor Cain. Cain committed murder, and Tubal-cain, the first who knew how to sharpen iron and copper, furnished the instruments used in wars and combats. Naamah, "the lovely," earned her name from the sweet sounds which she drew from her cymbals when she called the worshippers to pay homage to idols. Unlike Istehar, the pious maiden, Naamah, the lovely sister of Tubal-cain, led the angels astray with her beauty, and from her union with Shamdon sprang the devil Asmodeus. She was as shameless as all the other descendants of Cain, and as prone to bestial indulgences.

=== Commentary ===
Ramban on Genesis (c. 1246-1270) 4:22:2:

AND THE SISTER OF TUBAL-CAIN WAS NAAMAH. This is as if Scripture would say: “and a sister was born to him and her name was Naamah.” A similar sense is found in the verses: And Lotan’s sister was Timnah; And Miriam their sister; His sister's name was Maacah. In Bereshith Rabbah there are some Rabbis who say that Naamah was Noah's wife. “And why did they call her Naamah [which means lovely]? Because her deeds were lovely and pleasant.” By this the Rabbis meant to say that she was famous in those generations because she was a righteous woman and she gave birth to righteous children. This was why Scripture mentioned her. If so, a small remembrance of Cain was left in the world. However, if we say that she was not the woman from whom Noah begot his three sons, there is no reason for Scripture mentioning her. However, our Rabbis have another Midrash concerning her which states that she was the very beautiful woman in whom the bnei ha'elohim erred. This is hinted in the verse, And the 'bnei ha'elohim' saw the daughters of men, as mentioned in Pirkei d'Rabbi Eliezer. But other sources have it that Naamah was the wife of Shamdon, the mother of Ashmedai, and it is from her that the demons were born for her name is indeed found in the writings of “the use of the demons.” Scripture hints and deals briefly with such hidden matters.

=== Kabbalah ===
In Kabbalistic literature (e.g. Zohar, Zohar Chadash, Emeq haMelekh, Tuv haAretz) and sources based on it (e.g. Bahya ben Asher on Genesis, RaShBA) Naamah is transformed into a demonic entity.

In the Zoharic tradition, which is the primary source for the demoness Na'amah, she is the mother of demons (most notably of Ashmedai/Asmodeus), attracts angels (Watchers) and demons with her beauty, wanders at night seeking sleeping humans to seduce them and bear spirits from them, strangles children, and is closely associated with Lilith.

In later sources (e.g. Tuv haAretz, Bahya ben Asher on Genesis), she becomes one of the four mates of Samael, amongst Lilith, Agrat bat Mahalath and Mahalath.

== Family tree ==
Adam (Note: Genesis 4:1)	Eve
Cain	Abel (Note: Genesis 4:2)	Seth (Note: Genesis 4:25; 5:3)
Enoch (Note: Genesis 4:17)	Enos (Note: Genesis 4:26; 5:6–7)
Irad (Note: Genesis 4:18)	Kenan (Note: Genesis 5:9–10)
Mehujael	Mahalalel (Note: Genesis 5:12–13)
Methushael	Jared (Note: Genesis 5:15–16)
Adah (Note: Genesis 4:19)	Lamech	Zillah	Enoch (Note: Genesis 5:18–19)
Jabal (Note: Genesis 4:20)	Jubal (Note: Genesis 4:21)	Tubal-Cain (Note: Genesis 4:22)	Naamah	Methuselah (Note: Genesis 5:21–22)
Lamech (Note: Genesis 5:25–26)
Noah (Note: Genesis 5:28–30)
Shem (Note: Genesis 5:32)	Ham	Japheth
