= Jubal (Bible) =

Biblical figure

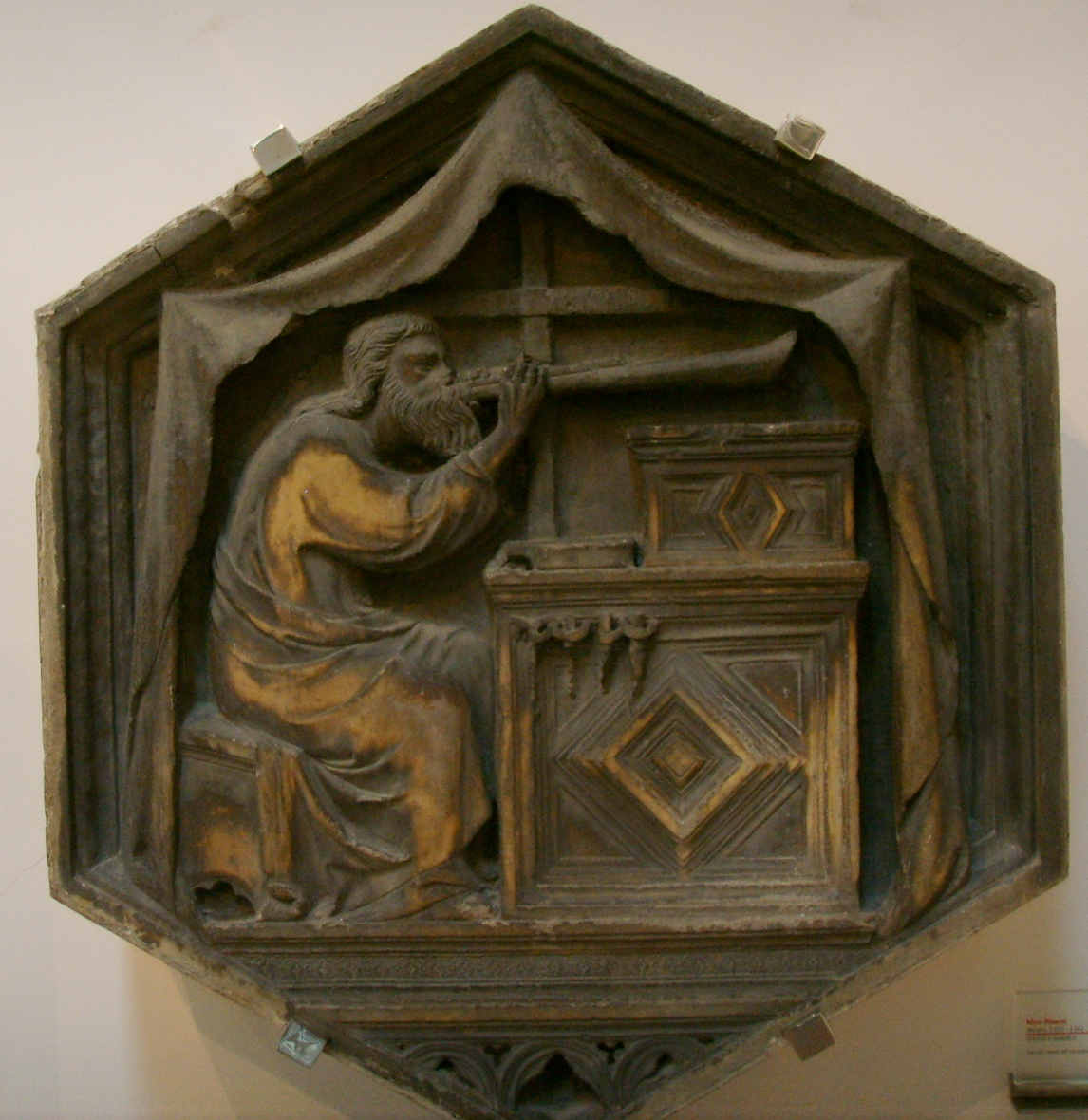
- Panel of Jubal playing the flute by Nino Pisano, 1334–1336
- Born: Jubal
- Other names: Yubal, Yuval
- Occupation: Musician
- Known for: Forefather of all musicians
- Parent(s): Lamech and Adah
- Relatives: Jabal (brother); Tubal-cain (half-brother); Naamah (half-sister)

Jubal (also Yuval, Yubal or Tubal; Hebrew: יוּבָל – Yūḇāl) is a biblical figure in Genesis 4:21 of the Hebrew Bible and Old Testament. Mentioned only once, he is sometimes regarded by Christians, particularly by medieval commentators, as the 'inventor of music'. A descendant of Cain, his father is Lamech and his brother is Jabal.

== Biblical narrative ==
Jubal is known only from his appearance in Genesis 4:21 of the Hebrew Bible and Old Testament. The account describes him as a descendant of Cain and the son of Lamech and Adah. He is also a brother of Jabal, and half-brother of Tubal-cain and Naamah. Genesis credits him as the forefather of certain instruments: the kinnor (Hebrew: כנור) and ʿuḡāḇ (עוגב, a reed instrument, perhaps a flute). The translations of these vary depending on the edition:

"he was the ancestor of all those who play the lyre and pipe" (NRSV)

"he was the father of all such as handle the harp and organ" (KJV)

"he was the father of all who play stringed instruments and pipes" (NIV)

== Family tree ==
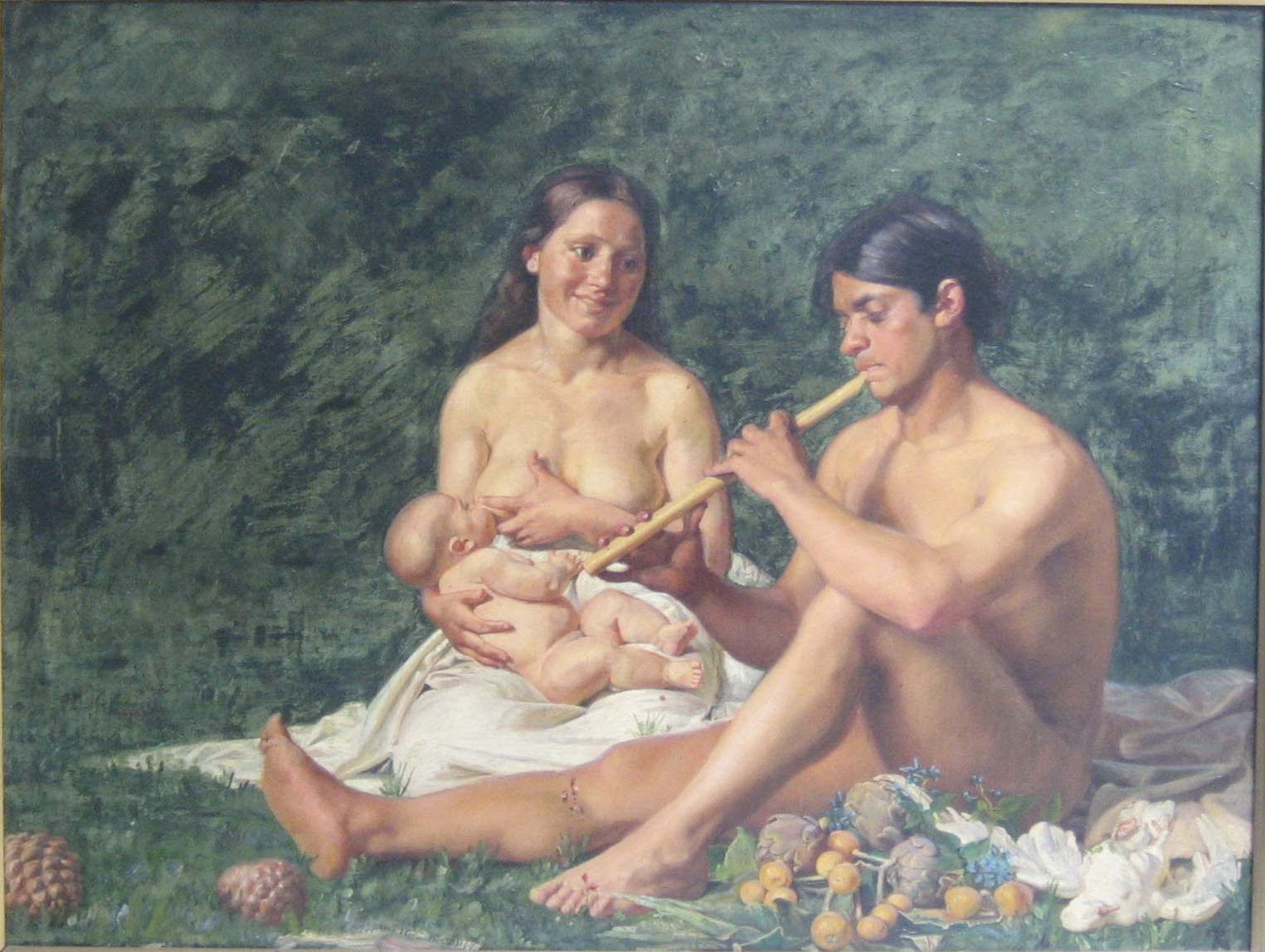
Jubal and Family, by Kristian Zahrtmann, 1876–1878

Adam (Note: Genesis 4:1) | Eve
Cain | Abel (Note: Genesis 4:2) | Seth (Note: Genesis 4:25; 5:3)
Enoch (Note: Genesis 4:17) | Enos (Note: Genesis 4:26; 5:6–7)
Irad (Note: Genesis 4:18) | Kenan (Note: Genesis 5:9–10)
Mehujael | Mahalalel (Note: Genesis 5:12–13)
Methushael | Jared (Note: Genesis 5:15–16)
Adah (Note: Genesis 4:19) | Lamech | Zillah | Enoch (Note: Genesis 5:18–19)
Jabal (Note: Genesis 4:20) | Jubal (Note: Genesis 4:21) | Tubal-Cain (Note: Genesis 4:22) | Naamah | Methuselah (Note: Genesis 5:21–22)
Lamech (Note: Genesis 5:25–26)
Noah (Note: Genesis 5:28–30)
Shem (Note: Genesis 5:32) | Ham | Japheth

== In Islamic sources ==
According to an unnamed Jewish source mentioned in al-Tabari's 915 History of the Prophets and Kings, Jubal invented musical instruments during the time of Mahalalel.
