= Lamech (descendant of Cain) =

Biblical figure, descendant of Cainan, Descendant of Seth, brother of Cain and Abel

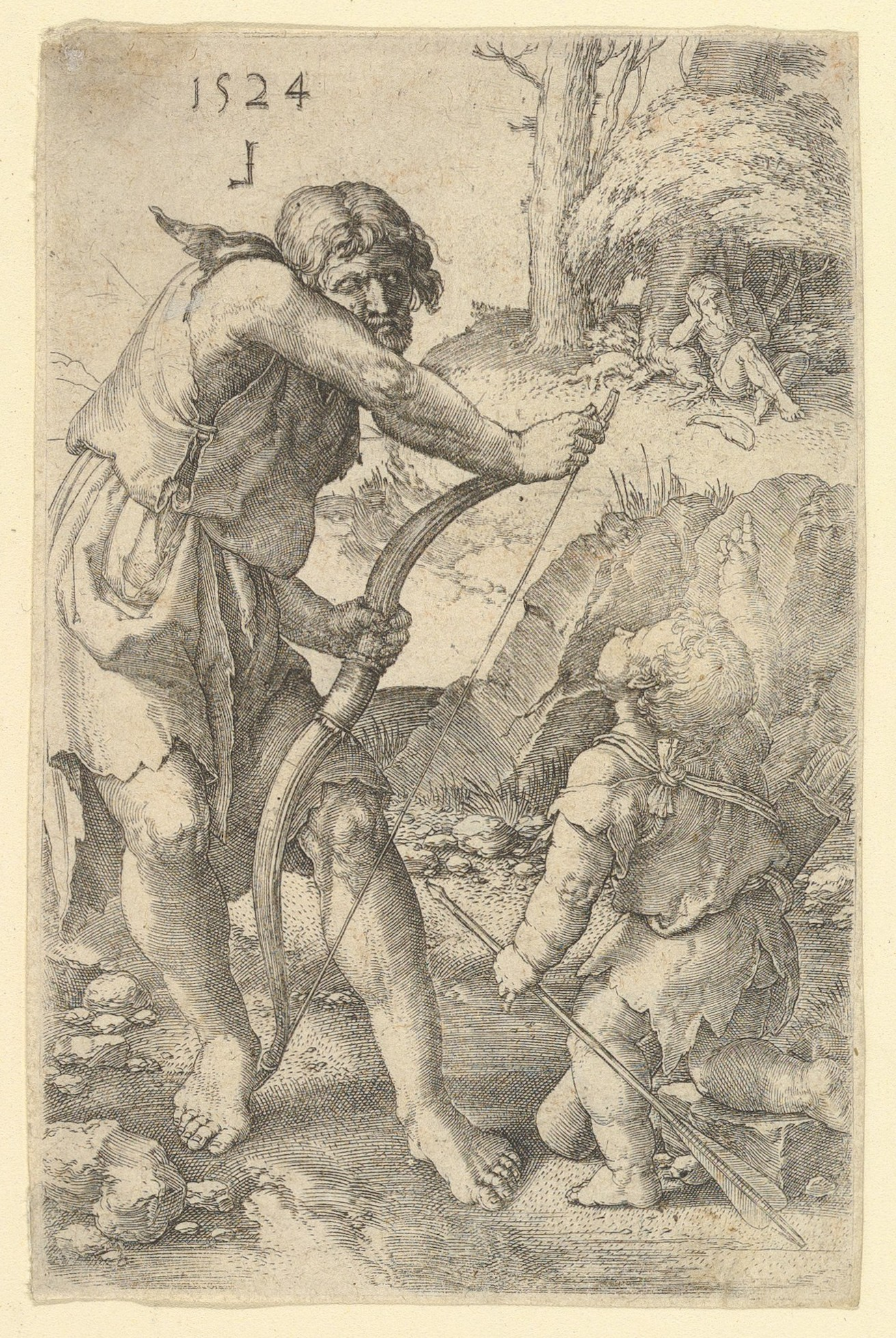
Lamech and Cain, 1524 engraving by Lucas van Leyden

Lamech (/ˈleɪmɪk/; Hebrew: לֶמֶךְ Lémeḵ, in pausa לָמֶךְ Lā́meḵ) is a figure appearing in the Old Testament's Book of Genesis, where he is the seventh generation from Adam and father of Jabal, the first breeder of livestock, Tubal-Cain, the first metalworker, Jubal, the first musician, and Naamah. This Lamech appears in the Yahwist genealogy (the line of Cain); the Priestly source has another Lamech who is the father of Noah.

This Lamech is distinguished as an insolent man in the Abrahamic texts.

== Character ==
Lamech is generally characterized in a poor light in the verses that mention him, highlighting him as viciously murderous.

=== Polygamy ===
Lamech is the earliest instance of polygamy in the Abrahamic narrative. Biblical verse Genesis 4:19 states

Lamech married two women, one named Adah and the other Zillah.

Lamech is recorded taking on two wives simultaneously.

=== Murder ===
Furthermore, biblical verse Genesis 4:23-24 states

Lamech said to his wives:

Adah and Zillah, listen to me; wives of Lamech, hear my words.
I have killed a man for wounding me, a young man for injuring me.
If Cain is avenged seven times, then Lamech seventy-seven times.

Here Lamech admits to killing a young man in retaliation for striking him. Lamech further boasts of his wrath of vengeance as eleven times worse than Cain's wrath of vengeance.

== Comparative religion ==
The Adam progeny list is comparable to the ancient Mesopotamian tradition of seven pre-flood heroes who originate arts and culture.

== Family tree ==
Adam (Note: Genesis 4:1) | Eve
Cain | Abel (Note: Genesis 4:2) | Seth (Note: Genesis 4:25; 5:3)
Enoch (Note: Genesis 4:17) | Enos (Note: Genesis 4:26; 5:6–7)
Irad (Note: Genesis 4:18) | Kenan (Note: Genesis 5:9–10)
Mehujael | Mahalalel (Note: Genesis 5:12–13)
Methushael | Jared (Note: Genesis 5:15–16)
Adah (Note: Genesis 4:19) | Lamech | Zillah | Enoch (Note: Genesis 5:18–19)
Jabal (Note: Genesis 4:20) | Jubal (Note: Genesis 4:21) | Tubal-Cain (Note: Genesis 4:22) | Naamah | Methuselah (Note: Genesis 5:21–22)
Lamech (Note: Genesis 5:25–26)
Noah (Note: Genesis 5:28–30)
Shem (Note: Genesis 5:32) | Ham | Japheth

== See also ==
- Genealogies of Genesis

== Bibliography ==
- Rogers, Jeffrey S. (2000). "Lamech". In Freedman, David Noel; Myers, Allen C. (eds.). Eerdmans Dictionary of the Bible. Eerdmans. ISBN 9781250088703.
