= Genealogies of Genesis =

Genealogies appearing in the Book of Genesis

The Hebrew Bible’s Book of Genesis contains a number of genealogies, providing a framework around which the book is structured. Beginning with Adam, genealogies in Genesis 4, 5, 10, 11, 22, 25, 29–30, 35–36, and 46 move the narrative forward from the creation to the beginnings of the Israelites' existence as a people.

Adam's lineage in Genesis contains two branches:

- Genesis 4:17-26 identifies the descendants of Cain, and
- Genesis 5 identifies the descendants of Seth. Seth's genealogy is then continued in later chapters.

Chapter 10 sets out the Generations of Noah (also called the Table of Nations), accounting for the populating of the Earth by Noah's descendants. This section is not strictly a genealogy but an ethnography.

== Treatment of ages ==
Genesis 5 and Genesis 11 include the ages at which each of the patriarchs had the progeny named as well as the number of years he lived thereafter. Many of the ages given in the text are long, but could have been considered modest in comparison to the ages given in other works (for instance, the Sumerian King List).

The ages include patterns surrounding the numbers five and seven, for instance the 365 year life of Enoch (the same as the number of full calendar days in a solar year) and the 777 year life of Lamech (repetitional emphasis of the number seven). Overall, the ages display clear mathematical patterns, leading some people to conclude that number symbolism was used to construct them. Nevertheless, since Genesis 5 and 11 provide the age of each patriarch at the birth of his named descendant, it also appears to present a gapless chronology from Adam to Abraham, even if the named descendant is not always a first-generation son.

== Generations of Adam and Eve ==
Genesis names three children of Adam and Eve, Cain, Abel and Seth. Genesis 4:1–18 recounts how Cain killed his brother Abel: there is no record of Abel having any descendants, and Eve refers to Seth in Genesis 4:25 as "another child in place of Abel". A genealogy tracing the descendants of Cain is given in Genesis 4, while the line from Seth down to Noah appears in Genesis 5. Scholars have noted similarities between these descents: most of the names in each are variants of those in the other, though their order differs, with the names of Enoch and Mahalalel/Mehujael switching places in the two pedigrees. It is "as if they were different versions of the same underlying tradition". This has led to speculation that a single original genealogical descent had diverged during independent transmission, only to be brought back together and put to different uses when the Book of Genesis was compiled from its Jahwist and Priestly sources.

The ages at which each of these characters fathered their children are all high by later standards, ranging from 65 (when Enoch and Mahalalel fathered their sons) to 500 years (Noah). Theologian John Gill speculated that "no doubt" earlier children were born before the ones listed, who are named because they are the ones who take forward the lineage "directly from Adam to Noah".

Comparison of descents from Adam given in Genesis
(Generations aligned as per Hooke).

Adam	Eve
Abel	Seth
Enos (Enosh)
Cain	Cainan (Kenan)
Enoch	Mahalalel
Irad	Jared
Mehujael	Enoch
Methushael	Methuselah
Adah	Lamech	Zillah	Lamech
Jabal	Jubal	Tubal-Cain	Naamah	Noah
Shem	Ham	Japheth

== Generations of Noah ==
Following the Genesis flood narrative, a large multi-branched genealogy presents the descendants of the sons of Noah. (Genesis 10:9) The 70 names given represent biblical geography, consisting of local ethnonyms and toponyms presented in the form of eponymous ancestors (names in origin-myth genealogies that are to be understood as ancestors and embodiments of the peoples whose names they bear). This is a symbolic presentation of the peopling of the world and indicates a view of the unity of the human race. The peoples and places are not organised by geography, language family or ethnic groups, and probably do not represent the geography of a particular point in history, instead deriving from an old nucleus of geographical knowledge to which additional names/peoples were subsequently added.

== Abraham's family tree ==
The following is a family tree for the descendants of the line of Noah's son Shem, through Abraham to Jacob and his sons. Dashed lines are marriage connections.

Noah
Shem	Ham	Japheth
Elam	Ashur	Arphaxad	Lud	Aram	Unnamed daughters
Salah
Eber
Peleg	Joktan
Reu	Almodad	Sheleph	Hazarmaveth	Jerah	Hadoram
Serug	Uzal	Diklah	Obal	Abimael	Sheba
Nahor	Ophir	Havilah	Jobab
Terah
Sarah	Abraham	Hagar	Haran
Keturah	Nahor
Ishmael	Milcah	Lot	Iscah
6 sons
Ishmaelites	7 sons	Bethuel	1st daughter	2nd daughter
Isaac	Rebekah	Laban	Moabites	Ammonites
Esau	Jacob	Rachel	Unnamed sons
Bilhah
Edomites	Zilpah
Leah	Potipherah
1.Reuben	7.Gad	5.Dan	12.Joseph	Asenath
2.Simeon	8.Asher	6.Naphtali	13.Benjamin
3.Levi
4.Judah
9.Issachar	Manasseh	Ephraim
10.Zebulun
11.Dinah

== Genesis chrono-genealogy ==
The numbers given in the text are usually similar but do vary between versions. Nearly all modern translations of Genesis are derived from the Masoretic Text, but there are also two other versions of Genesis: the Samaritan Pentateuch and the Septuagint (a Greek translation of a Hebrew text). Translations from the Masoretic Text are preferred by Western Christians, including Roman Catholics and Protestants, and by followers of Orthodox Judaism; whereas the Greek version is preferred by Eastern Christians, including Eastern Orthodox, Coptic, Ethiopic, Jacobite and Armenian. The Samaritan Pentateuch is held sacred by the Samaritans. The numbers in the Masoretic, Samaritan, and Lucianic Septuagint versions of Genesis are shown in this table:

The following table lists the patriarchs that appear in the Vulgate and the Septuagint, but their names are spelled as they appear in the King James Version of the Bible. Their year of birth differs according to the Vulgate or the Septuagint. Also given is each patriarch's age at the birth of his named son and the age of the patriarch's death. Cainan, born after the flood, is mentioned in the Septuagint but not the Vulgate. Methuselah survived the flood according to the Septuagint (but not the Vulgate), even though he was not on Noah's Ark.

The genealogies of Genesis contain a difficulty with regards to the birth of Arphaxad. One method of calculating places the birth of Arphaxad 600 years after the birth of Noah, while another places Arphaxad's birth 602 years after Noah. The table below uses the 602-year method; the 600 year method would decrease the date for Arphaxad and all the following figures by two years.

This chart counts year totals only. Anno Mundi (AM, or 'in the year of the world') can be calculated by adding 2 to any given value in either the "Birth" or "Death" columns. The result will give a corresponding date in AM. The epoch for this calendar system is 3761 BC.

(Note: the numbers in green are consistent across all versions, while the numbers in yellow are contradicted in one other version and the numbers in red are contradicted by more than one of the other versions.)

		Masoretic & Vulgate					Samaritan Pentateuch					Septuagint (Lucian)
Patriarch	Meaning	_{Birth}	_{Son}	_{Remain}	_{Lived}	_{Death}	_{Birth}	_{Son}	_{Remain}	_{Lived}	_{Death}	_{Birth}	_{Son}	_{Remain}	_{Lived}	_{Death}	Wife/Wives/etc
Adam	"humanity"	0	130	800	930	930	0	130	800	930	930	0	230	700	930	930	Eve
Seth	possibly "substitution"	130	105	807	912	1042	130	105	807	912	1042	230	205	707	912	1142
Enosh	"humanity"	235	90	815	905	1140	235	90	815	905	1140	435	190	715	905	1340
Kenan	etymology uncertain	325	70	840	910	1235	325	70	840	910	1235	625	170	740	910	1535
Mahalalel	"praising El" / "praise of El"	395	65	830	895	1290	395	65	830	895	1290	795	165	730	895	1690
Jared	"to descend"	460	162	800	962	1422	460	62	785	847	1307	960	162	800	962	1922
Enoch	etymology uncertain	622	65	300	365¹	987	522	65	300	365¹	887	1122	165	200	365¹	1487
Methuselah	meaning uncertain	687	187	782	969	1656	587	67	653	720	1307	1287	187	782	969	2256
Lamech	meaning unknown	874	182	595	777	1651	654	53	600	653	1307	1454	188	565	753	2207
Noah	meaning uncertain	1056	502^{2}	—	950	2006	707	502^{2}	—	950	1657	1642	502^{2}	—	950	2592
Shem	name	1558	100	500	600	2158	1209	100	500	600	1809	2144	100	500	600	2744
Arphaxad	meaning uncertain	1658	35	403	438	2096	1309	135	303	438	1747	2244	135	430	565	2809
Cainan	meaning uncertain	—	—	—	—	—	—	—	—	—	—	2379	130	330	460	2839
Salah	branch	1693	30	403	433	2126	1444	130	303	433	1877	2509	130	330	460	2969
Eber	possibly "traveler"	1723	34	430	464	2187	1574	134	270	404	1978	2639	134	270	404	3043
Peleg	etymology disputed	1757	30	209	239	1996	1708	130	109	239	1947	2773	130	209	339	3112
Reu	possibly "shepherd" or "friend"	1787	32	207	239	2026	1838	132	107	239	2077	2903	132	207	339	3242
Serug	Sarug (name of a city)	1819	30	200	230	2049	1970	130	100	230	2200	3035	130	200	330	3365
Nahor	snorting	1849	29	119	148	1997	2100	79	69	148	2248	3165	179	125	304	3469
Terah	etymology debated	1878	70	135	205	2083	2179	70	75	145	2324	3344	70	205	275	3619
Abram	exalted father	1948	100	—	175	2123	2249	100	—	175	2424	3414	100	—	175	3589	Sarai; (Hagar); Keturah

^{1}According to most interpretations, including the New Testament Epistle to the Hebrews, Enoch did not die, but was taken away by God (at an age of 365). Genesis states that Enoch "walked with God; and he [was] not; for God took him."

^{2}On this chart Noah is listed as having lived 502 years when he begat Shem and this calculation is based on the birth year of Arphaxad. The extra-biblical Book of Jasher also mentions that Noah was 502 years old when his wife Naamah bore Shem.

=== Number symbolism ===
The following table lists all the ages of the patriarchs from Adam to Moses in the Masoretic Text, which add up to 12,600.

Patriarchs	Age	Patriarchs	Age
1. Adam	930	14. Eber	464
2. Seth	912	15. Peleg	239
3. Enosh	905	16. Reu	239
4. Kenon	910	17. Serug	230
5. Mehalalel	895	18. Nahor	148
6. Jared	962	19. Terah	205
7. Enoch	365	20. Abraham	175
8. Methuselah	969	21. Isaac	180
9. Lamech	777	22. Jacob	147
10. Noah	950	23. Levi	137
11. Shem	600	24. Kohath	133
12. Arpachshad	438	25. Amram	137
13. Shelah	433	26. Moses	120
TOTAL			12,600

The value of 12,600 is a variant of the symbolic value of 1,260 later used in the Book of Revelation (e.g. Rev. 11:2–11; 12:4–6, 11; 13:5), although may derive from earlier traditions. Another example of the numerical schema of 12,600 can be found in the War Scroll discovered at Qumran, where "the Sons of Light shall fight against the Sons of Darkness in the final days for a period of 35 years. Employing the Jewish luni-solar calendar of the 360-day year, 35 years equals 12,600 days."

=== Usage of Anno Mundi ===
The current formal usage of the Anno Mundi calendar era is implemented based on the calculations of Maimonides in Mishneh Torah (completed in AD 1178). It is the official method of calculating years for the Hebrew calendar currently in use. Based on a calculation using the Masoretic Text recorded in the Seder Olam Rabbah (c 160 AD) of Rabbi Jose ben Halafta, the first five days of creation in Genesis were in Anno Mundi 1, and the creation of Adam was on 1 Tishrei (Rosh Hashanah) in Anno Mundi 2 which corresponds to 3760 BC. The official Anno Mundi epoch is Anno Mundi 1. This first year begins almost a full year before creation and is commonly referred to as The Year Of Emptiness or The Ascension Year in Jewish tradition and coincides with the years 3761/3760 BC.

=== Counting years ===
Counting a number of years based on an annual fixed calendar date yields a different result from a rolling year count based on dates such as birthdays which have the possibility of being at any time of the year and change depending on the individual. Using this method has led some chronologists to add or subtract a 0.5 year margin to/from the birth year of each patriarch to account for unknown birth dates.

The first mention in Genesis of the use of a fixed method to reckon years is made in Genesis 1 referring to the "lights in the firmament". A fixed calendar system is usually determined by an annual epoch such as New Year's Day (1 January) which is fixed by the alignment of astronomical objects; the reckoning of the year occurs on its epoch. Years represented in Anno Mundi dates could be interpreted to be in alignment with Rosh Hashanah and are counted according to its annual occurrence.

=== Birth years of Shem and Arphaxad ===
There are several different interpretations as to the exact birth year of Shem and his son Arphaxad. Based on Noah being at least 500 years old when he began to beget children and Noah's sons each having an age difference, it is not uncommon to encounter chronologies that list Shem as being 98 years old when the flood began. Shem begat Arphaxad two years after the flood when he was 100 years old.

In the Masoretic, Vulgate and the Samaritan Pentateuch the method of starting from the birth of Noah and adding exactly 500 years until Shem, and adding another 100 years until the birth of Arphaxad ^{(Born 2 years after the flood)} would be the same year as the death of Methuselah following the above chart. Since Methuselah was not mentioned in Genesis among those who were aboard the ark, it is possible that his death came in the same year of the flood.

Based on the Masoretic Text, counting 1656 years on the above chart will result in being the 600th year of Noah's life, the year of the death of Methuselah and year that the flood began. The two-year discrepancy is commonly resolved by rendering the birth year of Shem in the same year that Noah was 502 years old, and rendering Arphaxad as having been born two years after the death of Methuselah and the flood.

=== Differences in the numbers ===
A comparison of the Genesis 5 numbers (Adam through Noah) in the above table shows that the ages when the sons were born plus the remainders equal the totals given in each version, but each version uses different numbers to arrive at these totals. The three versions agree on some of the total ages at death, but many of the other numbers differ by exactly 100 years. The Septuagint ages of the fathers at the birth of their sons are in many instances 100 years greater than the corresponding ages in the other two versions; in Genesis 11 some of the Samaritan Pentateuch ages agree with the Septuagint ages and are also 100 years beyond that of the Masoretic and Vulgate versions.

The Samaritan chronology has Jared, Methuselah, and Lamech dying in Noah's 600th year, the year of the flood. The Masoretic chronology also has Methuselah dying in Noah's 600th year, but the Masoretic version uses a different chronology than the Samaritan version, with about 350 extra years between creation and flood. The Lucianic text of the Septuagint has Methuselah surviving the flood and therefore the 100 year differences were not an attempt by the Septuagint editors to have Jared, Methuselah, or Lamech die during or prior to the flood. Some scholars argue that the differences between the Masoretic and Septuagint chronologies in Genesis 5 can be explained as alterations designed to rationalize a primary Masoretic system of chronology to a later Septuagint system. According to another scholar, to assume that the Masoretic Text is primary "is a mere convention for the scholarly world" and "it should not be postulated in advance that MT reflects the original text of the biblical books better than the other texts." The present-day Greek Orthodox Septuagint text still offers the Lucianic numbers for Methuselah, which undoubtedly are the numbers as found in the original Septuagint text, most likely based on the Hebrew original that was used for the translation. This opens the possibility that these were the original numbers in the Hebrew tradition also, that only later, after discovering the chronological discrepancy, have been changed by adapting the Methuselah numbers to 167+782=969 (in some Septuagint manuscripts) or to 187+782=969 (in some other Septuagint manuscripts as well as in the present-day Masoretic text). The scholarly Septuagint translation of the Hebrew Pentateuch into Greek at Alexandria, Egypt, in about 280 BC worked from a Hebrew text that was edited in the 5th and 4th centuries BC. This would be centuries older than the proto–Masoretic Text selected as the official text by the Masoretes.

The Genesis 5 ages were presumably intended to be read at face value, as years and not months. Attempts to rationalize the ages by translating "years" as "months" results in some of the Genesis 5 people fathering children when they were five years old (if the Masoretic chronology is assumed to be primary).

There is one discrepancy between the antediluvian chronologies of different texts of the Septuagint - the age at which Methuselah gave birth to Lamech: 167 or 187 years. Because of this, the date of the Flood is shifted by 20 years. This difference is probably due to the different lists of the Septuagint from which the translation was made. For example, according to Lucianic version of the Septuagint (end of the 3rd century), the Flood was in 2242, and according to the Code of Alexandria of the Septuagint the Flood was in 2262 from cm. (as in the printed editions of the Septuagint, for example, the Frankfurt Bible or the reconstruction of G. B. Sweet; as well as in the Church Slavonic translation of the Elizabethan Bible).

== Priestly source ==
The Priestly source illustrates history in Genesis by compiling the genealogy beginning with the "generations of the heavens and the earth" and continuing through Abraham, Ishmael, and Isaac to the descendants of Jacob and Esau. Jacob's descendants are listed in Genesis 46:8-27, beginning with the phrase "these are the names."

== Similar Mesopotamian traditions ==
The genealogies of Genesis have been likened to the Sumerian King List. Some versions of the latter (not including the oldest known version, where no flood is mentioned) consist of a list of implausibly long-lived figures, followed by a flood, followed by a list of figures with long but gradually shortening lifespans that move into normal historical lengths. Attempts at finding a correlation between the ages presented in the two lists have been made.

== See also ==
- Chronology of the Bible
- Genealogies in the Bible
- Genealogy of Jesus
- List of oldest fathers
