= Genealogies in the Bible =

Genealogies in the Bible are structured lists of ancestors and descendants that trace lineage, often linking key figures across generations, and are found primarily in books such as Genesis and the canonical Gospels.

== Genesis ==
The book of Genesis records the descendants of Adam and Eve. The enumerated genealogy in chapters 4, 5, and 11, reports the lineal male descent to Abraham, including the age at which each patriarch fathered his named son and the number of years he lived thereafter. The genealogy for Cain is given in chapter 4, and the genealogy for Seth is in chapter 5. The genealogy in chapter 10, recording the male descendants of Noah, is known as the Table of Nations.

=== Family tree of Adam ===
Adam (Note: Genesis 4:1)	Eve
Cain	Abel (Note: Genesis 4:2)	Seth (Note: Genesis 4:25; 5:3)
Enoch (Note: Genesis 4:17)	Enos (Note: Genesis 4:26; 5:6–7)
Irad (Note: Genesis 4:18)	Kenan (Note: Genesis 5:9–10)
Mehujael	Mahalalel (Note: Genesis 5:12–13)
Methushael	Jared (Note: Genesis 5:15–16)
Adah (Note: Genesis 4:19)	Lamech	Zillah	Enoch (Note: Genesis 5:18–19)
Jabal (Note: Genesis 4:20)	Jubal (Note: Genesis 4:21)	Tubal-Cain (Note: Genesis 4:22)	Naamah	Methuselah (Note: Genesis 5:21–22)
Lamech (Note: Genesis 5:25–26)
Noah (Note: Genesis 5:28–30)
Shem (Note: Genesis 5:32)	Ham	Japheth

=== Table of Nations ===
The Table of Nations is an extensive list of descendants of Noah found in chapter 10 of the Book of Genesis, representing an ethnology from an Iron Age Levantine perspective.

=== Family tree of Abraham ===
Noah
Shem	Ham	Japheth
Elam	Ashur	Arphaxad	Lud	Aram	Unnamed daughters
Salah
Eber
Peleg	Joktan
Reu	Almodad	Sheleph	Hazarmaveth	Jerah	Hadoram
Serug	Uzal	Diklah	Obal	Abimael	Sheba
Nahor	Ophir	Havilah	Jobab
Terah
Sarah	Abraham	Hagar	Haran
Keturah	Nahor
Ishmael	Milcah	Lot	Iscah
6 sons
Ishmaelites	7 sons	Bethuel	1st daughter	2nd daughter
Isaac	Rebekah	Laban	Moabites	Ammonites
Esau	Jacob	Rachel
Bilhah
Edomites	Zilpah
Leah	Potipherah
1.Reuben	7.Gad	5.Dan	12.Joseph	Asenath
2.Simeon	8.Asher	6.Naphtali	13.Benjamin
3.Levi
4.Judah
9.Issachar	Manasseh	Ephraim
10.Zebulun
11.Dinah

=== Family tree of Levi ===
Levi	Adinah (Note: In the Masoretic Text, Levi's wife is not named. She is called Adina in the Septuagint and Adinah in the Book of Jasher (Chapter 45, Verse 5-6), which also says that she was a daughter of Jobab, the son of Yoktan, the son of Eber.)
Gershon	Kehath	Merari
Libni	Shimei	Izhar	Hebron	Uzziel	Mahli	Mushi
Jochebed (Note: Jochebed is described as Levi's daughter, and thus her husband Amram's aunt, in the Book of Numbers (Numbers 26:59), the Masoretic Text of Exodus 6:20 and the Book of Jasher (Chapter 67, Verse 2-3). However, some manuscripts of the Septuagint Book of Exodus instead call her Amram's father's cousin, and others state that she was Amram's cousin.)	Amram	Mishael	Elzaphan	Zithri
Miriam	Aaron	Moses	Zipporah
Gershom	Eliezer

== Genealogy of Jesus in the New Testament ==
The New Testament provides two accounts of the genealogy of Jesus, one in the Gospel of Matthew and another in the Gospel of Luke. Matthew starts with Abraham, while Luke begins with Adam.{Luke 3:23-38} The lists are identical between Abraham and David but differ radically from that point. Matthew has twenty-seven generations from David to Joseph, whereas Luke has forty-two, with almost no overlap between the names on the two lists. Notably, the two accounts also disagree on who Joseph's father was: Matthew says he was Jacob, while Luke says he was Heli.

Traditional Christian scholars (starting with the historian Eusebius) have put forward various theories that seek to explain why the lineages are so different, such as that Matthew's account follows the lineage of Joseph, while Luke's follows his legal lineage through his biological uncle via Levirate marriage ("Matthan, whose descent is traced to Solomon, begot Jacob, Matthan dying, Matthat, whose lineage is from Nathan, by marrying the widow of the former, had Heli. Hence, Heli and Jacob were brothers by the same mother.") Some modern critical scholars like Marcus Borg and John Dominic Crossan claim both genealogies as inventions, to bring the Messianic claims into conformity with Jewish criteria.

== Comparison of the genealogies ==
The following table is a side-by-side comparison of the genealogies found in Genesis 5&11, Ruth 4, 1Chronicles 1-3, Matthew 1 and Luke 3.

Comparison of genealogies
Luke 3	1 Chronicles 1-3	Genesis 5, 11	Ruth 4	Matthew 1
God-Jesus	Adam-Zerubbabel	God-Perez	Perez-David	Dynastic & Selective Bloodline
1. God	—	God	—	—
2. Adam	Adam	Adam	—	—
3. Seth	Seth	Seth	—	—
4. Enos	Enos	Enos	—	—
5. Cainan	Cainan	Cainan	—	—
6. Mahalaleel	Mahalaleel	Mahalaleel	—	—
7. Jared	Jared	Jared	—	—
8. Enoch	Enoch	Enoch	—	—
9. Methuselah	Methuselah	Methuselah	—	—
10. Lamech	Lamech	Lamech	—	—
11. Noah	Noah	Noah	—	—
12. Shem	Shem	Shem	—	—
13. Arphaxad	Arphaxad	Arphaxad	—	—
14. Cainan	Cainan	Cainan	—	—
15. Shelah	Shelah	Shelah	—	—
16. Eber	Eber	Eber	—	—
17. Peleg	Peleg	Peleg	—	—
18. Reu	Reu	Reu	—	—
19. Serug	Serug	Serug	—	—
20. Nahor	Nahor	Nahor	—	—
21. Terah	Terah	Terah	—	—
22. Abraham	Abraham	Abraham	—	Abraham
23. Isaac	Isaac	Isaac	—	Isaac
24. Jacob	Jacob	Jacob	—	Jacob
25. Judah	Judah	Judah	—	Judah
26. Perez	Perez	Perez	Perez	Perez
27. Hezron	Hezron	—	Hezron	Hezron
28. Arni	Ram	—	Ram	Aram
29. Amminadab	Amminadab	—	Amminadab	Amminadab
30. Nahshon	Nahshon	—	Nahshon	Nahshon
31. Salmon	Salmon	—	Salmon	Salmon
32. Boaz	Boaz	—	Boaz	Boaz
33. Obed	Obed	—	Obed	Obed
34. Jesse	Jesse	—	Jesse	Jesse
35. David	David	—	David	King of Israel, David
36. Nathan	Nathan, Solomon	Solomon	—	King of Israel, Solomon
37. Mattatha	Rehoboam	—	—	King of Judah, Rehoboam
38. Menna	Abijam	—	—	King of Judah, Abijam
39. Melea	Asa	—	—	King of Judah, Asa
40. Eliakim	Jehoshaphat	—	—	King of Judah, Jehoshaphat
41. Jonam	Jehoram	—	—	King of Judah, Joram
42. Joseph	Ahaziah	—	—	—
43. Judah	Jehoash	—	—	—
44. Simeon	Amaziah	—	—	—
45. Levi	Azariah	—	—	King of Judah, Uzziah
46. Matthat	Jotham	—	—	King of Judah, Jotham
47. Jorim	Ahaz	—	—	King of Judah, Ahaz
48. Eliezer	Hezekiah	—	—	King of Judah, Hezekiah
49. Joshua	Manasseh	—	—	King of Judah, Manasseh
50. Er	Amon	—	—	King of Judah, Amon
51. Elmodam	Josiah	—	—	King of Judah, Josiah
52. Cosam	Jehoiakim	—	—	—
53. Addi	Jehoiachin	—	—	King of Judah, Jeconiah
54. Melchi	—	—	—	—
55. Neri	—	—	—	—
56. Shealtiel	Shealtiel	—	—	Shealtiel
57. Zerubbabel	Zerubbabel	—	—	Zerubbabel
58. Rhesa	Hananiah	—	—	—
59. Joannan	Shecaniah	—	—	Abiud
60. Joda	Shemaiah	—	—	—
61. Josech	Neariah	—	—	Eliakim
62. Semei	Elioenai	—	—	—
63. Mattathias	Hodaviah	—	—	Azor
64. Maath	—	—	—	—
65. Nagge	—	—	—	Zadok
66. Esli	—	—	—	—
67. Naum	—	—	—	—
68. Amos	—	—	—	Achim
69. Mattathias	—	—	—	—
70. Joseph	—	—	—	Eliud
71. Jannai	—	—	—	—
72. Melchi	—	—	—	Eleazar
73. Levi	—	—	—	—
74. Matthat	—	—	—	Matthan
75. Heli	—	—	—	Jacob
76. Joseph	—	—	—	Joseph
77. Jesus Christ	—	—	—	Jesus Christ

== See also ==
- Jewish genealogy
- Kings of Israel and Judah
