= Abraham's family tree =

Family tree of Abraham in the Book of Genesis

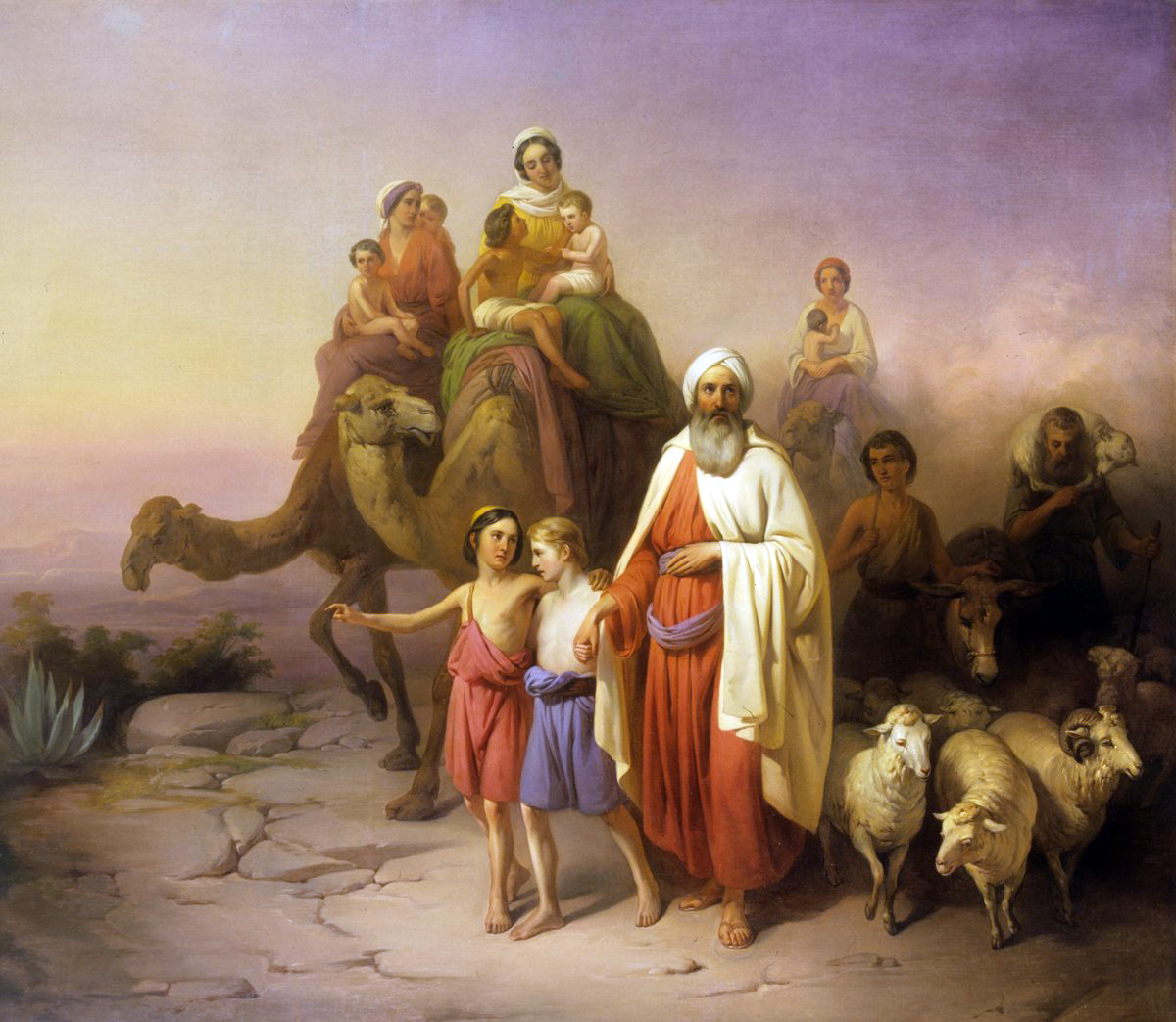
The migration of Abraham and his relatives to Canaan (1850) by József Molnár, Hungarian National Gallery

Abraham is known as the patriarch of the Israelite people through Isaac, the son born to him and Sarah in their old age, and the patriarch of the Ishmaelite people through his son Ishmael, born to Abraham and Hagar, Sarah's Egyptian servant. He also took Keturah as a wife after the death of Sarah, and she bore him Zimran, Jokshan, Medan, Midian, Ishbak, and Shuah (Gen. 25).

Although Abraham's forefathers were from Ur of the Chaldees in southern Mesopotamia (in present-day Iraq) according to the biblical narrative, God led Abraham on a journey to the land of Canaan, which God promised to his descendants.

== Source criticism ==
The genealogy of Abraham can be drawn together from texts in Genesis 5, 10:1–7, 20, 22–23, 31–33, and 11. The documentary hypothesis attributes these genealogies to the priestly source.

== Biblical narrative ==
Abram and Sarai prospered materially but they had no children. Abram thought to leave his estate to a trusted servant, but God promised him a son and heir. When he was 86 years old, Sarai suggested and Abram agreed that a practical way to have a child was through Sarai's servant Hagar. Hagar conceived right away and in time Ishmael was born. This situation brought strife rather than happiness between Hagar and Sarai. Nevertheless, God saw Hagar’s suffering and promised that although this was not the child promised to Abram, he would nevertheless make Ishmael’s descendants into a great nation also.

In Genesis 17, El Shaddai, "Almighty God", changed Abram’s name to Abraham, for he would be a father of many nations. In addition, his wife Sarai's name was changed to Sarah, for she would be a mother of nations. Three visitors came to Abraham and said that he would have a son. Sarah believed she was too old to have a child and laughed. Yet she did conceive (Genesis 21:1-7) and gave birth to a child named Isaac. After the death of Sarah, Abraham became concerned for his lineage, and wanted to ensure that Isaac married a woman from his own country and family, and not a Canaanite woman from the local population among whom he had settled. He directed his most senior servant to return to Nahor to find a wife for Isaac. The servant encountered Rebekah and brought her back to Canaan. Isaac married Rebekah. Abraham then married Keturah, who bore him six more sons – Zimran, Jokshan, Medan, Midian, Ishbak and Shuah.

=== Family tree ===
The following is a family tree for the descendants of the line of Noah's son Shem, through Abraham to Jacob and his sons. Dashed lines are marriage connections.

Not all individuals in this portion of the Bible are given names. For example, one English translation of the Bible states in Genesis 11:13 that "After the birth of Shelah, Arphachshad lived 403 years and begot sons and daughters." The previous line (11:12) only clarifies the name of one child, stating that at 35-years-old, "Arphachshad . . . begot Shelah." Some other children, such as Cainan, are only described in later translations that are not considered part of the original, canonical text of the Hebrew Bible.

Genesis 22:20-24 notes that information about the descendants of his brother Nahor was brought to Abraham after he returned to Beersheba following the Akedah when he had demonstrated his willingness to sacrifice his son Isaac, and God had provided a ram for sacrifice in acknowledging his faith.

Noah
Shem	Ham	Japheth
Elam	Ashur	Arphaxad	Lud	Aram	Unnamed daughters
Salah
Eber
Peleg	Joktan
Reu	Almodad	Sheleph	Hazarmaveth	Jerah	Hadoram
Serug	Uzal	Diklah	Obal	Abimael	Sheba
Nahor	Ophir	Havilah	Jobab
Terah
Sarah	Abraham	Hagar	Haran
Keturah	Nahor
Ishmael	Milcah	Lot	Iscah
6 sons
Ishmaelites	7 sons	Bethuel	1st daughter	2nd daughter
Isaac	Rebekah	Laban	Moabites	Ammonites
Esau	Jacob	Rachel	Unnamed sons
Bilhah
Edomites	Zilpah
Leah	Potipherah
1.Reuben	7.Gad	5.Dan	12.Joseph	Asenath
2.Simeon	8.Asher	6.Naphtali	13.Benjamin
3.Levi
4.Judah
9.Issachar	Manasseh	Ephraim
10.Zebulun
11.Dinah

== Quranic narrative ==
The family members and descendants of Abraham are called aal-Ibrahim, figuratively "The (people of) Abraham".

The Quran says:

"… but surely, We had given the 'Family of Abraham'—the Writings and the Wisdom—and conferred to them a Kingdom of Magnificence." —Sūrat an-Nisā' 4, āyāt 54; al-Qur'ān.

== See also ==
- Patriarchs
