= Generations of Noah =

Genealogy of the sons of Noah in Genesis

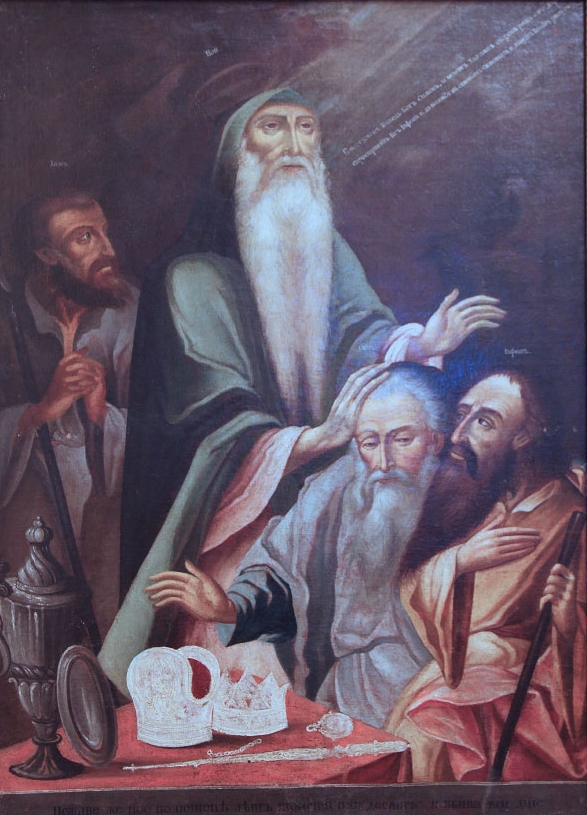
Noah dividing the world between his sons. Anonymous painter; Russian Empire, 18th century.

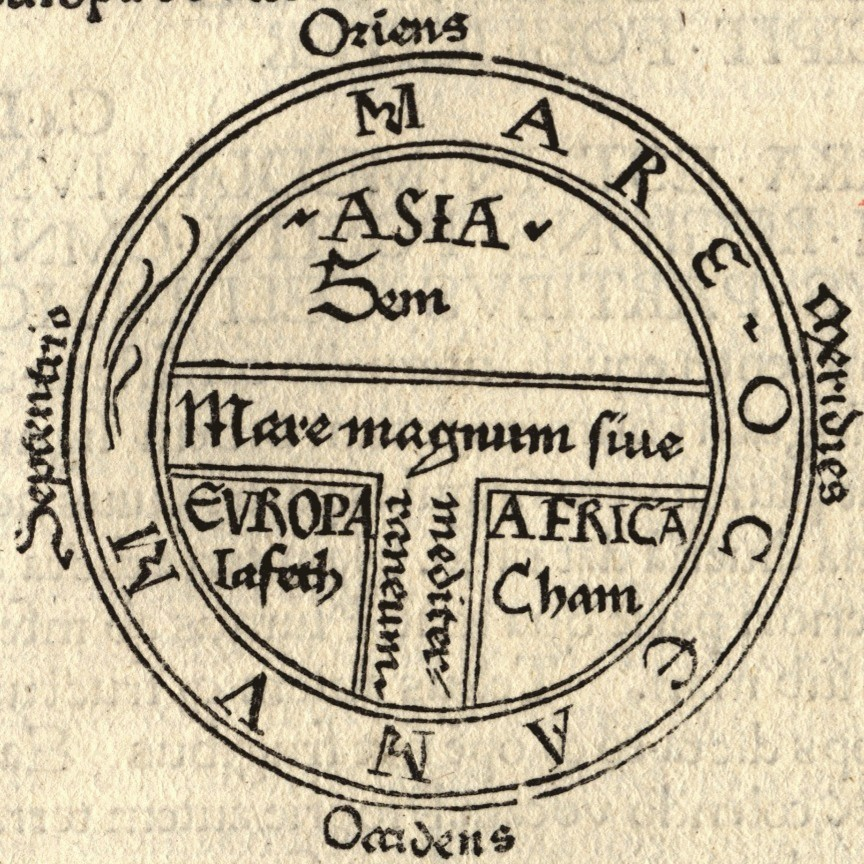
This T and O map, from the first printed version of Isidore's Etymologiae (Augsburg 1472), identifies the three known continents (Asia, Europe, and Africa) as respectively populated by descendants of Sem (Shem), Iafeth (Japheth), and Cham (Ham).

The Generations of Noah, also called the Table of Nations or Origines Gentium, is a genealogy of the sons of Noah, according to the Hebrew Bible (Genesis 10:9), and their dispersion into many lands after the Flood, focusing on the major known societies. The term 'nations' to describe the descendants is a standard English translation of the Hebrew word goyim following the c. 400 CE Latin Vulgate's nationes, and does not have the same political connotations that the word entails today.

The list of 70 names introduces for the first time several well-known ethnonyms and toponyms important to biblical geography, such as Noah's three sons Shem, Ham, and Japheth, from which 18th-century German scholars at the Göttingen school of history derived the race terminology Semites, Hamites, and Japhetites. Certain of Noah's grandsons were also used for names of peoples: from Elam, Ashur, Aram, Cush, and Canaan were derived respectively the Elamites, Assyrians, Arameans, Cushites, and Canaanites. Likewise, from the sons of Canaan: Heth, Jebus, and Amorus were derived Hittites, Jebusites, and Amorites. Further descendants of Noah include Eber (from Shem), the hunter-king Nimrod (from Cush).

As Christianity spread across the Roman Empire, it carried the idea that all human peoples were descended from Noah. However, not all Mediterranean and Near Eastern peoples were covered in the biblical genealogy; Iranic peoples such as Persians, Indic people such as Mitanni, and other prominent early civilizations such as the Ancient Greeks, Macedonians, and Romans, Hurrians, Iberians, Illyrians, Kassites, and Sumerians are missing, as well as the Northern and Western European peoples important to the Late Roman and Medieval world, such as the Celtic, Slavic, Germanic, and Nordic peoples; nor were others of the world's peoples, such as Native Americans, sub-Saharan Africans, Turkic and Iranic peoples of Central Asia, the Indian subcontinent, the Far East, and Australasia. Scholars later derived a variety of arrangements to make the table fit, with for example the addition of Scythians, which do feature in the tradition, being claimed as the ancestors of much of Northern Europe.

According to the biblical scholar Joseph Blenkinsopp, the 70 names in the list express symbolically the unity of humanity, corresponding to the 70 descendants of Israel that followed Jacob into Egypt in Genesis 46:27 and the 70 elders of Israel who visit God with Moses at the covenant ceremony in Exodus 24:1–9. Gordon J. Wenham states the use of the number 70 cannot be a coincidence, as it is also seen in Canaanite traditions and amongst other Biblical figures. Ronald Hendel characterizes the number 70 in the table as representing totality, and a redactor may have combined two originally distinct tables.

== Table of Nations ==
On the family pedigrees contained in the biblical pericope of Noah, Saadia Gaon (892–942) wrote:

The Scriptures have traced the patronymic lineage of the seventy nations to the three sons of Noah, as also the lineage of Abraham and Ishmael, and of Jacob and Esau. The blessed Creator knew that men would find solace at knowing these family pedigrees, since our soul demands of us to know them, so that [all of] mankind will be held in fondness by us, as a tree that has been planted by God in the earth, whose branches have spread out and dispersed eastward and westward, northward and southward, in the habitable part of the earth. It also has the dual function of allowing us to see the multitude as a single individual, and the single individual as a multitude. Along with this, man ought to contemplate also on the names of the countries and of the cities [wherein they settled]."

Moses Maimonides, echoing the same sentiments, wrote that the genealogy of the nations contained in the Law has the unique function of establishing a principle of faith, how that, although from Adam to Moses there was no more than a span of two-thousand five hundred years, and the human race was already spread over all parts of the earth in different families and with different languages, they were still people having a common ancestor and place of beginning.

Other biblical commentators observe that the Table of Nations is unique: thus R. N. Whybray writes that "it appears to be quite unique: no comparable ancient texts exist". When compared with other genealogies, it depicts a "broad network of cousins", with a "shallow chain of brotherly relationships", while other genealogies focus on "narrow chains of father-son relationships".

=== Book of Genesis ===
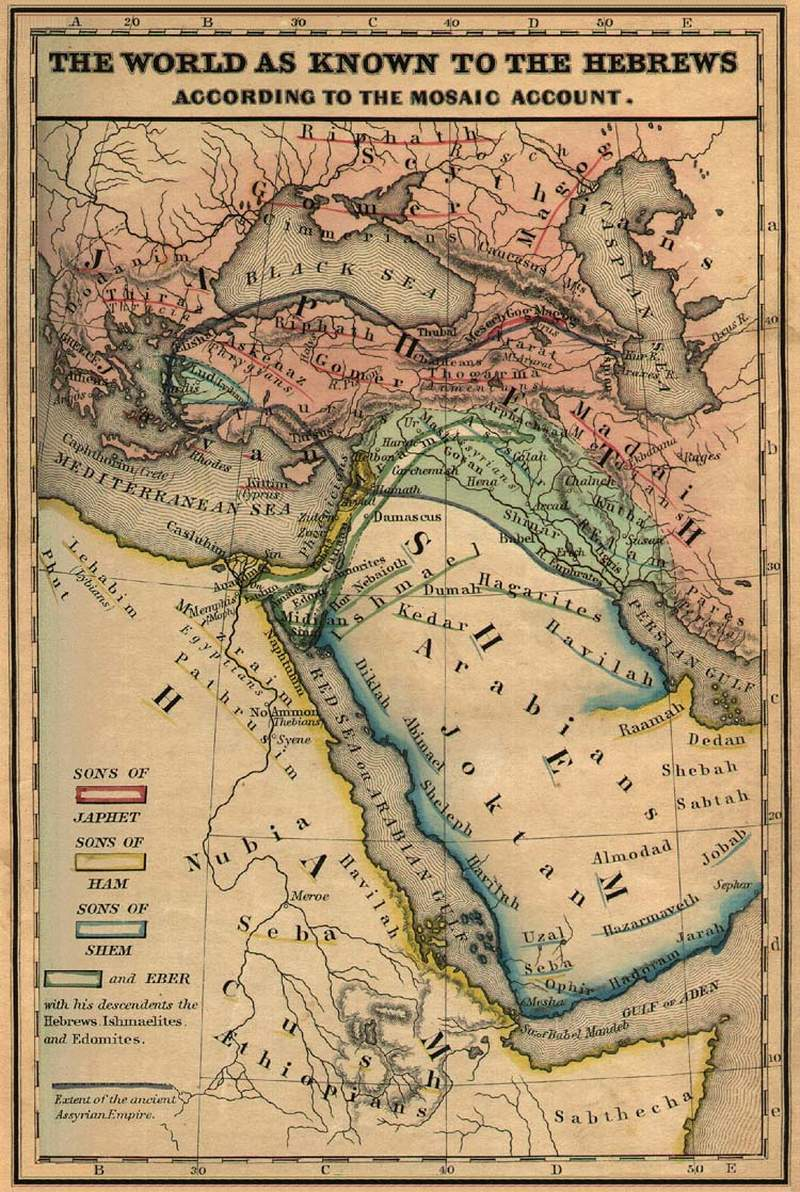
The world as known to the Hebrews according to the Mosaic account (1854 map), from the Historical Textbook and Atlas of Biblical Geography by Lyman Coleman.

Chapters 1–11 of the Book of Genesis are structured around five toledot statements ("these are the generations of..."), of which the "generations of the sons of Noah, Shem, Ham, and Japheth" is the fourth. Events before the Genesis flood narrative, the central toledot, correspond to those after: the post-deluvial world is a new creation corresponding to the Genesis creation narrative, and Noah had three sons who populated the world. The correspondences extend forward as well: there are 70 names in the Table, corresponding to the 70 Israelites who go down into Egypt at the end of Genesis and to the 70 elders of Israel who go up the mountain at Sinai to meet with God in Exodus. The symbolic force of these numbers is underscored by the way the names are frequently arranged in groups of seven, suggesting that the Table is a symbolic means of implying universal moral obligation. The number 70 also parallels Canaanite mythology, where 70 represents the number of gods in the divine clan who are each assigned a subject people, and where the supreme god El and his consort, Asherah, has the title "Mother/Father of 70 gods", which, due to the coming of monotheism, had to be changed, but its symbolism lived on in the new religion.

The overall structure of the Table in Genesis 10 is:

1. Introductory formula, verse 1
2. Japheth, verses 2–5
3. Ham, verses 6–20
4. Shem, verses 21–31
5. Concluding formula, verse 32.

Verse 1 corresponds to Genesis 7:13: "Noah and his sons, Shem and Ham and Japheth, and Noah's wife and the three wives of his sons with them entered the ark". Thus, all the descendants of Noah's own sons were born after the flood.

The overall principle governing the assignment of various peoples within the Table is difficult to discern: it purports to describe all humankind, but in reality restricts itself to the Egyptian lands of the south, Mesopotamia, Asia Minor, and the Ionian Greeks, and in addition, the "sons of Noah" are not organized by geography, language family or ethnic groups within these regions. The Table contains several difficulties: for example, the names Sheba and Havilah are listed twice, first as descendants of Cush the son of Ham (verse 7), and then as sons of Joktan, the great-grandsons of Shem, and while the Cushites are North African in verses 6–7 they are unrelated Mesopotamians in verses 10–14.

The date of composition of Genesis 1–11 cannot be fixed with any precision, although it seems likely that an early brief nucleus was later expanded with extra data. Portions of the Table itself may derive from the 10th century BCE, while others reflect the 7th century BCE and priestly revisions in the 5th century BCE. Its combination of world review, myth and genealogy corresponds to the work of the Greek historian Hecataeus of Miletus, active c. 520 BCE. Donald B. Redford identified that Sidon being the firstborn of Canaan instead of Tyre (which is never mentioned), points to a period where Sidon had greater fortunes and was the new leading city of Phoenicia. This pointed to a time between Nebuchadnezzar II campaigns against Tyre in the 6th century BCE and the Tennes rebellion in the 4th century BCE. Scholars estimate the final editing and compilation of the Table took place during this later period, to also account for geopolitical shifts. Russel Gmirkin argued that it instead dates to the 3rd century BCE.

=== Book of Chronicles ===
1 Chronicles 1 includes a version of the Table of Nations drawn from Genesis which has been edited to make clearer that the intention is to establish the background for Israel. This is done by condensing various branches to focus on the story of Abraham and his offspring. Most notably, it omits an account matching Genesis 10:9–14, in which Nimrod, a son of Cush, is linked to various cities in Mesopotamia, thus removing from Cush any Mesopotamian connection. In addition, Nimrod does not appear in any of the numerous lists of Mesopotamian Kings.

=== Book of Jubilees ===
The Table of Nations is expanded upon in detail in chapters 8–9 of the Book of Jubilees, sometimes known as the "Lesser Genesis", a work from the early Second Temple period. Jubilees is considered pseudepigraphical by most Christian and Jewish denominations but thought to have been held in regard by many of the Church Fathers. Its division of the descendants throughout the world are thought to have been heavily influenced by the "Ionian world map" described in the Histories of Herodotus, and the anomalous treatment of Canaan and Madai are thought to have been "propaganda for the territorial expansion of the Hasmonean state".

=== Septuagint version ===
The Hebrew Bible was translated into Greek in Alexandria at the request of Ptolemy II, who reigned over Egypt 285–246 BCE. Its version of the Table of Nations is substantially the same as that in the Hebrew text, but with the following differences:

- It lists Ἐλισὰ (Elisa) as an extra son of Japheth, giving him eight sons instead of seven, while continuing to list him also as a son of Javan, as in the Masoretic text.
- Whereas the Hebrew text lists Shelah as the son of Arpachshad in the line of Shem, the Septuagint has a Cainan as the son of Arpachshad and father of Shelah – the Book of Jubilees gives considerable scope to this figure. Cainan appears again at the end of the list of the sons of Shem.
- Obal, Joktan's eighth son in the Masoretic text, does not appear.

=== 1 Peter ===
In the First Epistle of Peter, 3:20, the author says that eight righteous persons were saved from the Great Flood, referring to the four named males, and their wives aboard Noah's Ark not enumerated elsewhere in the Bible.

== Sons of Noah: Shem, Ham, and Japheth ==
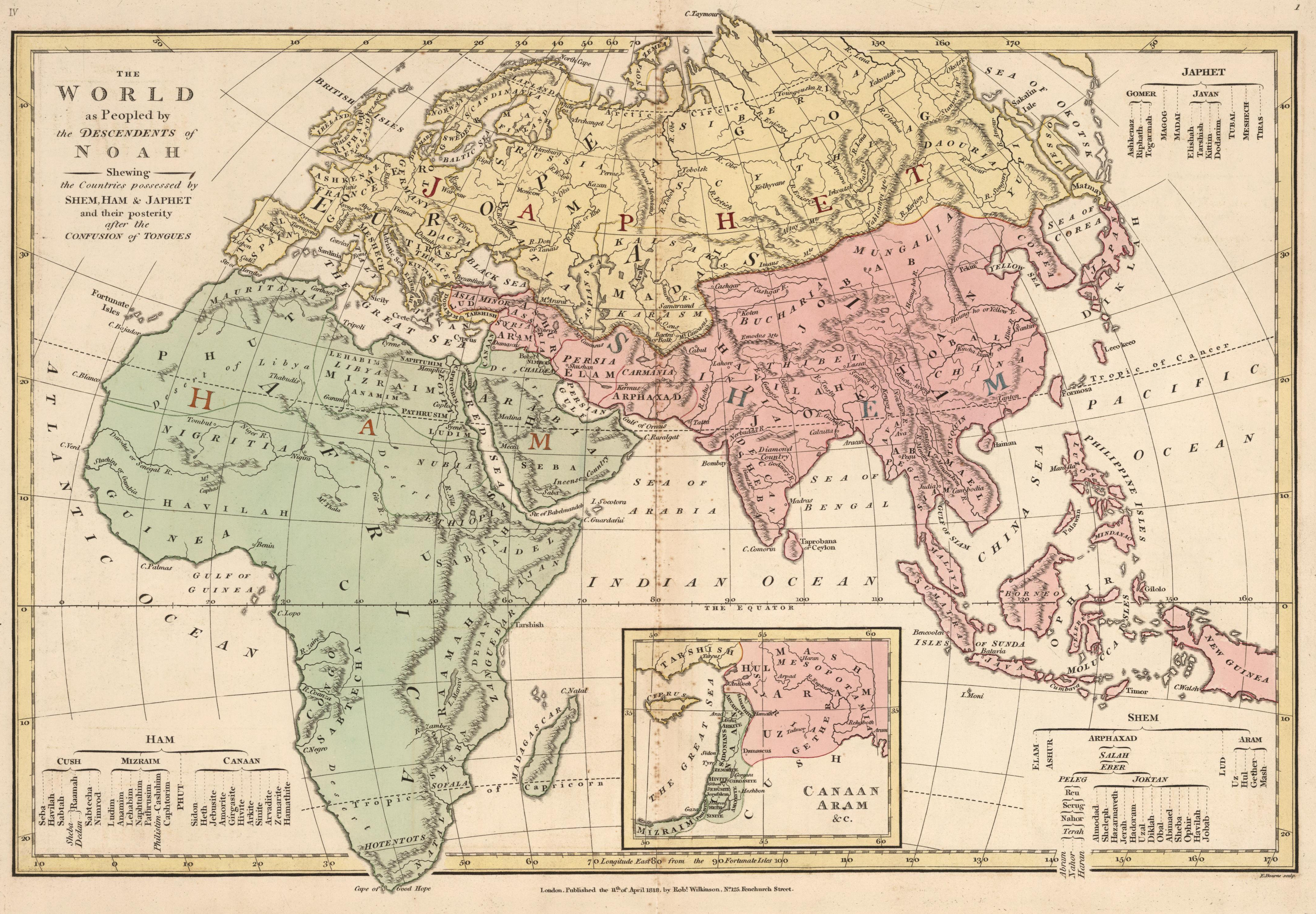
1823 map by Robert Wilkinson (see also 1797 version here). Prior to the mid-19th century, Shem was associated with all of Asia, Ham with all of Africa, and Japheth with all of Europe.

The Genesis flood narrative tells how Noah and his three sons (Shem, Ham, and Japheth), together with their wives, were saved from the deluge to repopulate the Earth. A brief statement in Genesis 6:10, before the account of the flood, states that these were the names of Noah's three sons.

- Shem's descendants: Genesis 10:21–30 gives one list of descendants of Shem. In Genesis 11:10–26, a second list of the descendants of Shem names Abraham and thus the Arabs and Israelites. In the view of some 17th-century European scholars (e.g., John Webb), the Native American peoples of North and South America, Iranic peoples of eastern Persia, and "the Indias" descended from Shem, possibly through his descendant Joktan.
- Ham's descendants: The forefather of Cush, Mizraim, and Phut, and of Canaan, whose lands include portions of Africa. The etymology of his name is uncertain; some scholars have linked it to terms connected with divinity, but a divine or semi-divine status for Ham is unlikely.
- Japheth's descendants: His name is associated with the mythological Greek Titan Iapetus, and his sons include Javan, the Greek city-states of Ionia. In Genesis 9:27 it forms a pun with the Hebrew root yph: "May God make room [the hiphil of the yph root] for Japheth, that he may live in Shem's tents and Canaan may be his slave."

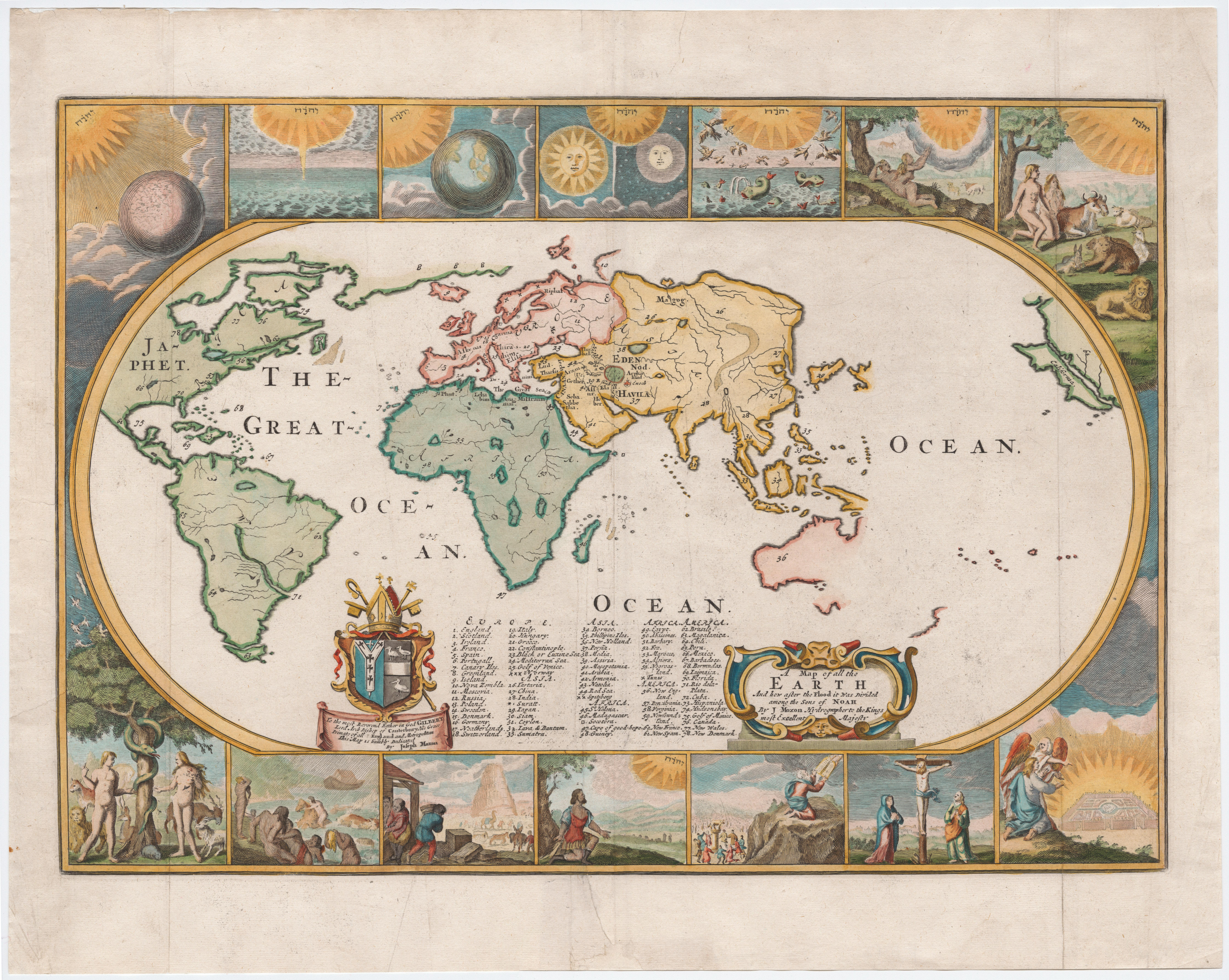
Map of the world by Joseph Moxon from 1681 showing Shem's descendants in Asia, Ham's descendants in Africa, and Japheth's descendants in Europe and North America.

Based on an old Jewish tradition contained in the Aramaic Targum of pseudo-Jonathan ben Uzziel, an anecdotal reference to the Origines Gentium in Genesis 10:2–ff has been passed down, and which, in one form or another, has also been relayed by Josephus in his Antiquities, repeated in the Talmud, and further elaborated by medieval Jewish scholars, such as in works written by Saadia Gaon, Josippon, and Don Isaac Abarbanel, who, based on their own knowledge of the nations, showed their migratory patterns at the time of their compositions:

"The sons of Japheth are Gomer, and Magog, and Madai, and Javan, and Tuval, and Meshech and Tiras, while the names of their diocese are Africa proper, (Note: The sense here is to Africa Zeugitana in the north; Africa Byzacena to its adjacent south (corresponding to eastern Tunisia), and Africa Tripolitania to its adjacent south (corresponding to southern Tunisia and northwest Libya). All of which were part of the Dioecesis Africae, or Africa propria, in early Roman times. See Leo Africanus (1974), vol. 1, p. 22. Neubauer (1868:400) thought that Afriki in the Aramaic text "should necessarily represent a country in Asia here. Some scholars want to see Phrygia there, others Iberia" (End Quote).) and Germania, and Media, and Macedonia, and Bithynia, and Moesia (var. Mysia) and Thrace. Now, the sons of Gomer were Ashkenaz, and Rifath and Togarmah, while the names of their diocese are Asia, and Parthia and the 'land of the barbarians.' The sons of Javan were Elisha, (Note: A name typically associated with the Aeolians, who settled in Ilida (formerly known as Elis) in Greece, and in the regions thereabout. Jonathan ben Uzziel, who rendered an Aramaic translation of the Book of Ezekiel in the early 1st-century CE, wrote that Elisha in Ezekiel 27:7 is the province of Italy, suggesting that his descendants had originally settled there. According to Hebrew Bible exegete, Abarbanel (1960:173), they also established a large colony in Sicily, whose inhabitants are known as Sicilians. According to Josippon (1971:1), Elisha's descendants had also settled in Germany (Almania).) and Tarshish, (Note: According to Abarbanel (1960:173), the descendants of Tarshish eventually settled in Tuscany and in Lombardy, and made-up parts of the populations of Florence, Milan, and Venice, underscoring the fact that the migration of man and of different ethnic groups is always fluid and ever changing.) Kitim and Dodanim, while the names of their diocese are Elis, and Tarsus, Achaia and Dardania." ---Targum Pseudo-Jonathan on Genesis 10:2–5

"The sons of Ḥam are Kūš, and Miṣrayim, and Fūṭ (Phut), and Kenaʻan, while the names of their diocese are Arabia, and Egypt, and Elīḥerūq and Canaan. The sons of Kūš are Sebā and Ḥawīlah and Savtah and Raʻamah and Savteḫā, [while the sons of Raʻamah are Ševā and Dedan]. The names of their diocese are called Sīnīrae, (Note: A place thought to be in present-day Sudan.) and Hīndīqī, (Note: A place on the sub-continent of India.) Samarae, (Note: Pliny the Elder, in his Natural History, describes this place as being situate along the banks of the Nile River.) Lūbae, Zinğae, (Note: The medieval Arab geographers gave the name Zinğ or Zinj to the African people who dwell along the Indian Ocean, such as in present-day Kenya, but may also refer to places along the Swahili Coast. See Ibn Khaldun (1927:106), who writes in the 14th-century of the Zinğ on this wise: "Ibn-Said enumerates nineteen peoples or tribes of which the black race is made up; Thus, on the East side, on the Indian Ocean, we find the Zendj (sic), a nation which owns the city of Monbeça (Mombasa) and practices idolatry" (End Quote). Ibn Khaldun (1967), p. 123, repeats the same in his work, The Muqaddimah, placing the people who are called Zinğ along the coast of the Indian Ocean, between Zeila and Mogadishu.) while the sons of Mauretinos (Note: Mauretinos was the forebear of the Black Moors, from whom the region in North Africa bears its name. His name is generally associated with the biblical Raʻamah, and whose posterity were called Maurusii by the Greeks. In Tangier (the 1st Mauretania), the Black Moors were already a minority race at the time of Pliny, largely supplanted by the Gaetulians. According to R. Saadia Gaon (1984:32), the descendants of Raʻamah (Mauretinos) were thought to have settled Kakaw, possibly Gao, along the bend of the Niger River. Alternatively, Saadia Gaon may have been referring to the Gaoga who inhabit a region bordering on Borno to the west and Nubia to the east. On this place, see Leo Africanus (1974: vol. 3, p. 852 - note 27)) are [the inhabitants of] Zemarğad and [the inhabitants of] Mezağ." ---Targum Pseudo-Jonathan on Genesis 10:6–7

"The sons of Shem are Elam, and Ashur, and Arphaxad, and Lud, and Aram. [And the children of Aram are these: Uz, and Hul, and Gether, and Mash.] Now, Arphaxad begat Shelah (Salah), and Shelah begat Eber. Unto Eber were born two sons, the one named Peleg, since in his days the [nations of the] earth were divided, while the name of his brother is Joktan. Joktan begat Almodad, who measured the earth with ropes; Sheleph, who drew out the waters of rivers; and Hazarmaveth, and Jerah, and Hadoram, and Uzal, and Diklah, and Obal, and Abimael, and Sheba, (Note: Pliny, in his Natural History, mentions this place under the name Sabaei.) and Ophir, (Note: In Jewish tradition, Ophir is often associated with a place in India, where the descendants of Ophir are thought to have settled. Fourteenth-century biblical commentator, Nathanel ben Isaiah, writes: "And Ophir, and Havilah, and Jobab (Gen. 10:29), these are the tracts of countries in the east, being those of the first clime" (End Quote), and which first clime, according to al-Biruni, the sub-continent of India falls entirely therein. Cf. Josephus, (Antiquities of the Jews 8.6.4., s.v. Aurea Chersonesus). The 10th-century lexicographer, Ben Abraham al-Fasi (1936:46), identified Ophir with Serendip, the old Persian name for Sri Lanka (aka Ceylon).) and Havilah, and Jobab, all of whom are the sons of Joktan." ---Targum Pseudo-Jonathan on Genesis 10: 22–28

Noahic descendant (Gen. 10:2 – 10:29)	Proposed historical identifications
Gomer	Cimmerians
Magog	Lydia (Mermnad dynasty)
Madai	Generally reckoned as the Medes, but other proposals include Matiene, Mannaea, and Mitanni.
Javan	Ionians
Tubal	Tabal
Tiras	Uncertain, proposals include Troy, Thrace and the Sea Peoples known as the Teresh.
Meshech	Muski
Ashkenaz	Scythians
Riphath	Uncertain, identified as Paphlagonia by Josephus and as the Riphean Mountains in the Book of Jubilees.
Togarmah	Tegarama
Elishah	Uncertain, usually reckoned as Alashiya, but other proposals include Magna Graecia, the Sicels, the Aeolians and Carthage.
Tarshish	Tarshish, though its location has been debated for centuries and remains uncertain.
Kittim	Kition
Dodanim	Uncertain, further complicated by its later attestation as Rodanim. Those assuming Dodanim represents the original form have proposed Dodona, Dardania, and Dardanus; whereas those assuming Rodanim represents the original have almost universally proposed Rhodes.
Cush	Kush
Mizraim	Egypt
Put	Ancient Libya
Canaan	Canaan
Seba	Sabaeans in the Horn of Africa
Havilah	Uncertain, probably Ḫawlan
Sabtah	Uncertain, possibly Šabwat
Raamah	Uncertain, possibly Ragmatum, an ancient city in southwest Arabia.
Sabtecha	Uncertain, possibly Shabakat, an ancient city in Hadhramaut.
Sheba	Sabaʾ
Dedan	Lihyan
Nimrod	Uncertain, various proposals exist imagining Nimrod as an ethnic group, person, city, and deity.
Ludim	Lydia, sometimes amended to read Lubim (Libya)
Anamim	Uncertain, proposals include Crete, an oasis in the Libyan Desert, a location south or west of Alexandria and the eastern desert between the Nile and the Red Sea.
Lehabim	Uncertain, sometimes suggested to represent Libya.
Naphtuhim	Uncertain, possibly Memphis, or Lower Egypt as a whole.
Pathrusim	Pathros
"the Casluhites"	Uncertain, perhaps Colchis
"the Caphtorites"	Caphtor, modern identification uncertain, proposals include Cilicia, Cyprus, and Crete.
Sidon	Sidonians (Phoenicians)
Heth	Biblical Hittites (Neo-Hittites)
"the Jebusites"	Jebusites, traditionally identified as an ethnic people dwelling in Jerusalem.
"the Amorites"	Amorites
"the Girgashites"	Possibly Karkisa.
"the Hivites"	Hivites, traditionally identified as a Canaanite people dwelling in northern Israel.
"the Arkites"	Arqa
"the Sinites"	Siyannu
"the Arvadites"	Arwad
"the Zemarites"	Sumur
"the Hamathites"	Hama
Elam	Elam
Ashur	Assyria
Arpachshad	Uncertain, possibly Chaldea
Lud	Lydia
Aram	Aram
Uz	"Land of Uz", hypothesized locations include Aram and Edom.
Hul	Uncertain, possibly Houla
Gether	Uncertain, sometimes suggested to represent Geshur.
Mash	Uncertain, sometimes equated with Massa, Meshech or Maacah (Genesis 22:24).
Selah	Uncertain
Eber	Hebrews
Peleg	Uncertain, possibly Palgu, a site at the junction of the Khabur and Euphrates rivers.
Joktan	Uncertain, perhaps related to the Qahtanites.
Almodad	Uncertain, possibly related to the clan name mwddn mentioned in Qatabanian inscriptions.
Sheleph	A South Arabian tribe referred to by Arab geographers as as-Salif or as-Sulaf.
Hazarmaveth	Hadhramaut
Jerah	Uncertain, possibly related to the place name WRḪN mentioned in a Sabean inscription.
Hadoram	Uncertain, possibly related to the place name DWRN mentioned in Sabean inscriptions.
Uzal	Uncertain, probably related to the place name ʾAzal, designating two different sites in South Arabia.
Diklah	Uncertain, probably related to the place name NḪL ḪRF, in the region of Sirwah.
Obal	Uncertain, probably related to the tribe BNW ʿBLM ("sons of ʿAbil"), mentioned in Sabean inscriptions and probably settled in the Yemeni highlands.
Abimael	Uncertain, it may be related to the tribe ʾBM ṮTR mentioned in Sabean inscriptions.
Ophir	Uncertain, proposals include the Farasan Islands, Sumatra, Sri Lanka, Poovar, numerous locations in Africa, Mahd adh Dhahab, and Zafar.
Jobab	Uncertain, probably related to the Sabaean tribe YHYBB (*Yuhaybab), mentioned in Old South Arabian inscriptions.

=== Problems with identification ===
Because of the traditional grouping of people based on their alleged descent from the three major biblical progenitors (Shem, Ham, and Japheth) by the three Abrahamic religions, in former years there was an attempt to classify these family groups and to divide humankind into three races called Caucasoid, Mongoloid, and Negroid (originally named "Ethiopian"), terms which were introduced in the 1780s by members of the Göttingen school of history. It is now recognized that determining precise descent-groups based strictly on patrilineal descent is problematic, as nations are not stationary. People are often multi-lingual and multi-ethnic, and people sometimes migrate from one country to another—whether voluntarily or involuntarily. Some nations have intermingled with other nations and can no longer trace their paternal descent, or have assimilated and abandoned their mother's tongue for another language. In addition, phenotypes cannot always be used to determine one's ethnicity because of interracial marriages. A nation today is defined as "a large aggregate of people inhabiting a particular territory united by a common descent, history, culture, or language." The biblical line of descent is irrespective of language, place of nativity, or cultural influences, as all that is binding is one's patrilineal line of descent. For these reasons, attempting to determine precise blood relation of any one group in today's Modern Age may prove futile. Sometimes people sharing a common patrilineal descent spoke two separate languages, whereas, at other times, a language spoken by a people of common descent may have been learnt and spoken by multiple other nations of different descent.

Another problem associated with determining precise descent-groups based strictly on patrilineal descent is the realization that, for some of the prototypical family groups, certain sub-groups have sprung forth, and are considered diverse from each other (such as Ismael, the progenitor of the Arab nations, and Isaac, the progenitor of the Israelite nation, although both family groups are derived from Shem's patrilineal line through Eber. The total number of other sub-groups, or splinter groups, each with its distinct language and culture is unknown.

Guy Darshan of Tel Aviv University, noted the presence of two different genealogies in Genesis 10 because of contradictions and stylistic differences.

Thomas Hieke of Johannes Gutenberg-Universität, showed Genesis 10 is not biological nor genetic, but an etiological mythic text that uses lineages and kinships to organize the known world of its authors. The framework was unique being a systematic genealogical integration rather than geographic lists of peoples which was common. Its closes analogues found in Greek literature like the Catalogue of Women. While the Ham line is negatively framed, Hieke sees the Table acting as a socio-political manifesto rooting humanity in Noah, having a state of primordial equality.

Anthropologists discovered that in tribal societies, genealogies are employed to express social and political relationships with others. The genealogies offer little for historiographic value, and instead reflect the social conditions of their composition. They could also be rearranged as the relationship between given tribes shifted. Mario Liverani explains that such genealogical models are artificial; with the villages and family being related through not a common origin, but rather their history of intermarriage, and it is a convergent model rather than divergent.

== Ethnological interpretations ==
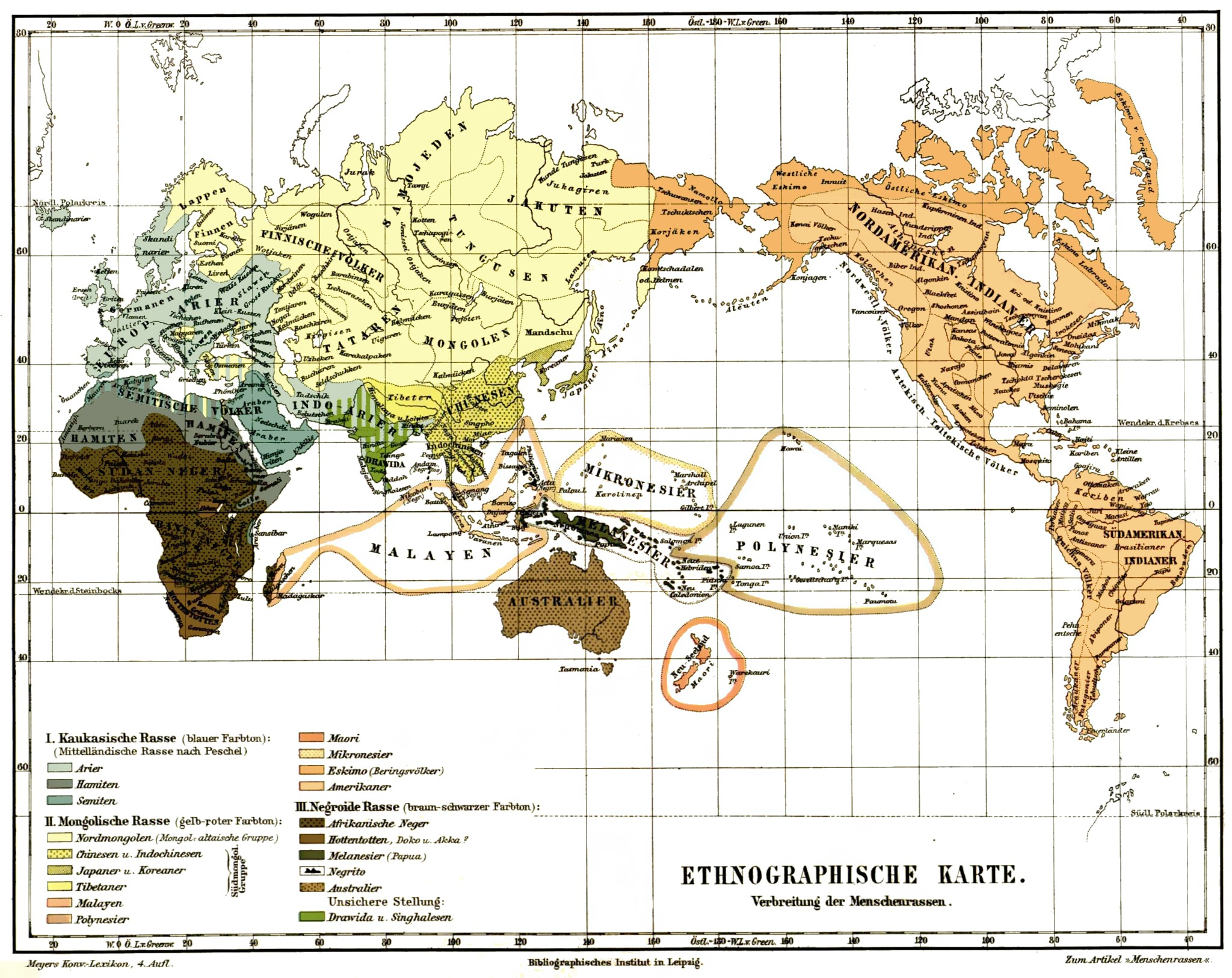
Meyers Konversations-Lexikon (1885–1890) ethnographic map: Caucasoid: Aryan Semitic Hamitic Negroid: African Negro Khoikhoi Melanesian Negrito Australoid Uncertain: Dravida & Sinhalese / Mongoloid: North Mongol Chinese & Indochinese Korean & Japanese Tibetan & Burmese Malay Polynesian Maori Micronesian Eskimo / Inuit American

Identifying geographically defined groups of people in terms of their biblical lineage, based on the Generations of Noah, has been common since antiquity. By the end of the 19th century, the influential German encyclopaedia, Meyers Konversations-Lexikon, divided humanity into three major races called Caucasoid, Mongoloid, and Negroid, each comprising various sub-races. While the "Hamites" of northern Africa and the horn of Africa were seen as Caucasoid, "Australians", "Melanesians", and "Negritoes" were seen as Negroid sub-races, although living outside the African continent. The only sub-races attributed to Africa were the "African Negroes" and the "Hottentots".

The early modern biblical division of the world's "races" into Semites, Hamites, and Japhetites was coined at the Göttingen school of history in the late 18th century, in parallel with the color terminology for race which divided mankind into five "colored" races ("Caucasian or White", "Mongolian or Yellow", "Aethiopian or Black", "American or Red", and "Malayan or Brown").

== Extrabiblical sons of Noah ==
There exist various traditions in post-biblical and talmudic sources claiming that Noah had children other than Shem, Ham, and Japheth who were born before the Deluge.

According to the Quran (Hud 42–43), Noah had another unnamed son who refused to come aboard the Ark, instead preferring to climb a mountain, where he drowned. Some later Islamic commentators give his name as either Yam or Kan'an.

According to Irish mythology, as found in the Annals of the Four Masters and elsewhere, Noah had another son named Bith who was not allowed aboard the Ark, and who attempted to colonise Ireland with 54 persons, only to be wiped out in the Deluge.

Some 9th-century manuscripts of the Anglo-Saxon Chronicle assert that Sceafa was the fourth son of Noah, born aboard the Ark, from whom the House of Wessex traced their ancestry; in William of Malmesbury's version of this genealogy (c. 1120), Sceaf is instead made a descendant of Strephius, the fourth son born aboard the Ark (Gesta Regnum Anglorum).

An early Arabic work known as Kitab al-Magall "Book of Rolls" (part of Clementine literature) mentions Bouniter, the fourth son of Noah, born after the flood, who allegedly invented astronomy and instructed Nimrod. Variants of this story with often similar names for Noah's fourth son are also found in the c. fifth century Ge'ez work Conflict of Adam and Eve with Satan (Barvin), the c. sixth century Syriac book Cave of Treasures (Yonton), the seventh century Apocalypse of Pseudo-Methodius (Ionitus), the Syriac Book of the Bee 1221 (Yônatôn), the Hebrew Chronicles of Jerahmeel, c. 12th–14th century (Jonithes), and throughout Armenian apocryphal literature, where he is usually referred to as Maniton; as well as in works by Petrus Comestor c. 1160 (Jonithus), Godfrey of Viterbo 1185 (Ihonitus), Michael the Syrian 1196 (Maniton), Abu al-Makarim c. 1208 (Abu Naiţur); Jacob van Maerlant c. 1270 (Jonitus), and Abraham Zacuto 1504 (Yoniko).

Martin of Opava (c. 1250), later versions of the Mirabilia Urbis Romae, and the Chronica Boemorum of Giovanni de' Marignolli (1355) make Janus (the Roman deity) the fourth son of Noah, who moved to Italy, invented astrology, and instructed Nimrod.

According to the monk Annio da Viterbo (1498), the Hellenistic Babylonian writer Berossus had mentioned 30 children born to Noah after the Deluge, including Macrus, Iapetus Iunior (Iapetus the Younger), Prometheus Priscus (Prometheus the Elder), Tuyscon Gygas (Tuyscon the Giant), Crana, Cranus, Granaus, 17 Tytanes (Titans), Araxa Prisca (Araxa the Elder), Regina, Pandora Iunior (Pandora the Younger), Thetis, Oceanus, and Typhoeus. However, Annio's manuscript is widely regarded today as having been a forgery.

Historian William Whiston stated in his book A New Theory of the Earth that Noah, who is to be identified with Fuxi, migrated with his wife and children born after the deluge to China, and founded Chinese civilization.

== See also ==
- Curse of Ham
- Generations of Adam
- Genealogies in the Bible
- Historicity of the Bible
- List of nations mentioned in the Bible
- Noah's Ark

== Bibliography ==
- Abarbanel, Isaac (1960). Commentary of Abarbanel on the Torah (Genesis) (in Hebrew). Vol. 1. Jerusalem: Bene Arbel Publishers. (an English translation published in 2016, by the Golan Abarbanel Research Institute, OCLC 1057900303)
- Adler, Elkan Nathan (2014). Jewish Travellers. London: Routledge. OCLC 886831002. (first printed in 1930)
- Alexander, Philip (1988). "Retelling the Old Testament". It is Written: Scripture Citing Scripture: Essays in Honour of Barnabas Lindars, SSF. CUP Archive. ISBN 9780521323475.
- Al-Hamdāni, al-Ḥasan ibn Aḥmad (1938). The Antiquities of South Arabia - The Eighth Book of Al-Iklīl. Oxford: Oxford University Press. OCLC 251493869. (reprinted in Westport Conn. 1981)
- Ben Abraham al-Fasi, David (1936). Solomon Skoss (ed.). The Hebrew-Arabic Dictionary of the Bible, Known as 'Kitāb Jāmiʿ al-Alfāẓ' (Agron) of David ben Abraham al-Fasi (in Hebrew). Vol. 1. New Haven: Yale University Press. p. 46. OCLC 840573323.
- Ben Maimon, Moses (1956). Guide for the Perplexed. Translated by Michael Friedländer (2nd ed.). New York: Dover Publishers. OCLC 318937112.
- Blenkinsopp, Joseph (2011). Creation, Un-creation, Re-creation: A Discursive Commentary on Genesis 1–11. A&C Black. ISBN 9780567372871.
- Bøe, Sverre (2001). Gog and Magog: Ezekiel 38–39 as pre-text for Revelation 19, 17–21 and 20, 7–10. Mohr Siebeck. ISBN 9783161475207.
- Brodie, Thomas L. (2001). Genesis As Dialogue: A Literary, Historical, and Theological Commentary. Oxford University Press. ISBN 9780198031642.
- Carr, David McLain (1996). Reading the Fractures of Genesis: Historical and Literary Approaches. Westminster John Knox Press. ISBN 9780664220716.
- Day, John (2014). "Noah's Drunkenness, the Curse of Canaan". In Baer, David A.; Gordon, Robert P. (eds.). Leshon Limmudim: Essays on the Language and Literature of the Hebrew Bible in Honour of A.A. Macintosh. A&C Black. ISBN 9780567308238.
- Day, John (2021). "The Table of the Nations in Genesis 10". From Creation to Abraham: Further Studies in Genesis 1-11. Bloomsbury Publishing. ISBN 978-0-567-70311-8.
- Dillmann, August (1897). Genesis: Critically and Exegetically Expounded. Vol. 1. Edinburgh, UK: T. and T. Clark. p. 314.
- D'Souza, Dinesh (1995). The End of Racism. New York, New York: Simon & Schuster Audio. ISBN 0671551299. OCLC 33394422.
- Epiphanius (1935). James Elmer Dean (ed.). Epiphanius' Treatise on Weights and Measures - The Syriac Version. Chicago: University of Chicago Press. OCLC 123314338.
- Gmirkin, Russell (2006). Berossus and Genesis, Manetho and Exodus: Hellenistic Histories and the Date of the Pentateuch. Bloomsbury Publishing USA. ISBN 9780567134394.
- Hendel, Ronald (2024). Genesis 1-11: A New Translation with Introduction and Commentary. The Anchor Yale Bible Commentaries. Yale University Press. ISBN 978-0-300-14973-9.
- Ibn Khaldun (1927). Histoire des Berbères et des dynasties musulmanes de l'Afrique septentrionale (Histoire des Dynasties Musulmanes) (in French). Vol. 2. Translated by Baron de Slane. Paris: P. Geuthner. OCLC 758265555.
- Ibn Khaldun (1958). The Muqaddimah: an introduction to history. Vol. 1. Translated by Franz Rosenthal. London: Routledge & Kegan Paul Ltd. OCLC 956182402.
- Ishtori Haparchi (2007). Avraham Yosef Havatzelet (ed.). Sefer Kaftor Ve'ferah (in Hebrew). Vol. 2 (chapter 11) (3 ed.). Jerusalem: Bet ha-midrash la-halakhah ba-hityashvut. OCLC 32307172.
- Isidore of Seville (1970). History of the Goths, Vandals, and Suevi. Translated by Guido Donini and Gordon B. Ford, Jr. Leiden: E.J. Brill. OCLC 279232201.
- Isidore of Seville (2006). Barney, Stephen A.; Lewis, W.J.; Beach, J.A. (eds.). The Etymologies of Isidore of Seville. Cambridge, UK: Cambridge University Press. ISBN 978-0-521-83749-1. OCLC 1130417426.
- Josephus (1998). Jewish Antiquities. The Loeb Classical Library. Vol. 1. Translated by Henry St. John Thackeray. Cambridge, Mass.: Harvard University Press. ISBN 0674995759.
- Josippon (1971). Hayim Hominer (ed.). Josiphon by Joseph ben Gorion Hacohen (3 ed.). Jerusalem: Hominer Publication. pp. 1–2. OCLC 776144459. (reprinted in 1978)
- Kaminski, Carol M. (1995). From Noah to Israel: Realization of the Primaeval Blessing After the Flood. A&C Black. ISBN 9780567539465.
- Keiser, Thomas A. (2013). Genesis 1–11: Its Literary Coherence and Theological Message. Wipf and Stock Publishers. ISBN 9781625640925.
- Knoppers, Gary (2003). "Shem, Ham and Japheth". In Graham, Matt Patrick; McKenzie, Steven L.; Knoppers, Gary N. (eds.). The Chronicler as Theologian: Essays in Honor of Ralph W. Klein. A&C Black. ISBN 9780826466716.
- Kautzsch, E.F. The Early Narratives of Genesis. (quoted in Orr, James (1917). The Fundamentals. Vol. 1. Los Angeles, CA: Biola Press.)
- Leo Africanus (1974). Robert Brown (ed.). History and Description of Africa. Vol. 1–3. Translated by John Pory. New York Franklin. OCLC 830857464. (reprinted from London 1896)
- Luzzatto, S.D. (1965). P. Schlesinger (ed.). S.D. Luzzatto's Commentary to the Pentateuch (in Hebrew). Vol. 1. Tel-Aviv: Dvir Publishers. OCLC 11669162.
- Macbean, A. (1773). A Dictionary of Ancient Geography: Explaining the Local Appellations in Sacred, Grecian, and Roman History. London: G. Robinson. OCLC 6478604.
- Machiela, Daniel A. (2009). "A Comparative Commentary on the Earths Division". The Dead Sea Genesis Apocryphon: A New Text and Translation With Introduction and Special Treatment of Columns 13–17. BRILL. ISBN 9789004168145.
- Matthews, K.A. (1996). Genesis 1–11:26. B&H Publishing Group. ISBN 9781433675515.
- McEntire, Mark (2008). Struggling with God: An Introduction to the Pentateuch. Mercer University Press. ISBN 9780881461015.
- McKinny, Chris (2021). "Finding Mash and His Brothers – The Historical Geography of the "Sons" of Aram (Gen 10:23; 1 Chr 1:17)". In Maeir, Aren M.; Pierce, George A. (eds.). To Explore the Land of Canaan: Studies in Biblical Archaeology in Honor of Jeffrey R. Chadwick. Walter de Gruyter GmbH & Co KG. ISBN 978-3-11-075780-4.
- Nethanel ben Isaiah (1983). Sefer Me'or ha-Afelah (in Hebrew). Translated by Yosef Qafih. Kiryat Ono: Mechon Moshe. OCLC 970925649.
- Neubauer, A. (1868). Géographie du Talmud (in French). Paris: Michel Lévy Frères.
- Notley, R.S.; Safrai, Z., eds. (2005). Eusebius, Onomasticon: The Place Names of Divine Scripture. Boston / Leiden: E.J. Brill. OCLC 927381934.
- Pietersma, Albert; Wright, Benjamin G. (2005). A New English Translation of the Septuagint. Oxford University Press. ISBN 9780199743971.
- Rogers, Jeffrey S. (2000). "Table of Nations". In Freedman, David Noel; Myers, Allen C. (eds.). Eerdmans Dictionary of the Bible. Amsterdam University Press. ISBN 9789053565032.
- Ruiten, Jacques T. A. G. M. (2000). Primaeval History Interpreted: The Rewriting of Genesis 1–11 in the Book of Jubilees. BRILL. ISBN 9789004116580.
- Saadia Gaon (1984). Yosef Qafih (ed.). Rabbi Saadia Gaon's Commentaries on the Pentateuch (in Hebrew) (4 ed.). Jerusalem: Mossad Harav Kook. OCLC 232667032.
- Saadia Gaon (1984b). Moshe Zucker (ed.). Saadya's Commentary on Genesis (in Hebrew). New York: Jewish Theological Seminary of America. OCLC 1123632274.
- Sadler, Rodney Steven Jr. (2009). Can a Cushite Change His Skin?: An Examination of Race, Ethnicity, and Othering in the Hebrew Bible. A&C Black. ISBN 9780567027658.
- Sailhamer, John H. (2010). The Meaning of the Pentateuch: Revelation, Composition and Interpretation. InterVarsity Press. ISBN 9780830878888.
- Scott, James M. (2005). Geography in Early Judaism and Christianity: The Book of Jubilees. Cambridge University Press. ISBN 9780521020688.
- Sozomen; Philostorgius (1855). The Ecclesiastical History of Sozomen and The Ecclesiastical History of Philostorgius. Translated by Edward Walford. London: Henry G. Bohn. OCLC 224145372.
- Strawn, Brent A. (2000a). "Shem". In Freedman, David Noel; Myers, Allen C. (eds.). Eerdmans Dictionary of the Bible. Amsterdam University Press. ISBN 9789053565032.
- Strawn, Brent A. (2000b). "Ham". In Freedman, David Noel; Myers, Allen C. (eds.). Eerdmans Dictionary of the Bible. Amsterdam University Press. ISBN 9789053565032.
- Targum Pseudo-Jonathan (1974). M. Ginsburger (ed.). Pseudo-Jonathan (Thargum Jonathan ben Usiël zum Pentateuch (in Hebrew). Berlin: S. Calvary & Co. OCLC 6082732. (First printed in 1903, Based on British Museum add. 27031)
- Thompson, Thomas L. (2014). "Narrative Reiteration and Comparative Literature: Problems in Defining Dependency". In Thompson, Thomas L.; Wajdenbaum, Philippe (eds.). The Bible and Hellenism: Greek Influence on Jewish and Early Christian Literature. Routledge. ISBN 9781317544265.
- Towner, Wayne Sibley (2001). Genesis. Westminster John Knox Press. ISBN 9780664252564.
- Uehlinger, Christof (1999). "Nimrod". In Van der Toorn, Karel; Becking, Bob; Van der Horst, Pieter (eds.). Dictionary of Deities and Demons in the Bible. Brill. ISBN 9780802824912.
- Wajdenbaum, Philippe (2014). Argonauts of the Desert: Structural Analysis of the Hebrew Bible. Routledge. ISBN 9781317543893.
- Yefet ben Ali (n.d.). Yefet ben Ali's Commentary on the Torah (Genesis) - Ms. B-51 (in Hebrew). St. Petersburg, Russia: Institute of Oriental Manuscripts of the Russian Academy of Sciences.
- Yu Huan (2004), "The Peoples of the West", Weilue 魏略, translated by John E. Hill (section 5, note 13) (This work, published in 429 CE, is a recension of Yu Huan's Weilue ("Brief Account of the Wei Dynasty"), the original having now been lost)
