= Uzal =

Biblical figure, son of Joktan in the Hebrew Bible

Uzal (Hebrew: אוּזָּ֔ל), in the Hebrew Bible, was a descendant of Shem and the sixth son of Joktan as per the Book of Genesis 10:27 and 1 Chronicles 1:21. His settlements are traced in the ancient name of Sanaa, the capital city of the Yemen. Easton's Bible Dictionary describes Uzal as a wanderer and the founder of an Arabian tribe.

== Biblical genealogies ==
Uzal was the sixth of thirteen sons of Joktan. As noted in Genesis 10:26–10:29, Joktan became the father of Almodad and Sheleph and Hazarmaveth and Jerah and Hadoram and Uzal and Diklah and Obal and Abimael and Sheba and Ophir and Havilah and Jobab.

Occurring in a series of genealogies intended to trace every race known to the ancient Hebrews to one of Noah's children, the Hebrew name Uzal probably referred to the region of Azāl around modern Sanaa in Yemen.
