= Sheba (king) =

Biblical figure in the Book of Genesis

- 'Abd al-Shams ibn Yashjub
- Children: Kahlan ibn Saba'; Himyar ibn Saba'
- Parent: Yashjub ibn Ya'rub (father)
- Relatives: Qahtan (great-grandfather)

Sheba (Hebrew: שְׁבָא) also known as Saba' is a biblical figure mentioned in the Book of Genesis. He is traditionally believed to be an ancient king of Yemen. He also plays a huge role in Arabian folklore as being the ancestor of the tribes of Sabaeans and later Himyarites who ruled Yemen until the middle of the 6th century CE.

== Genealogy and family ==
=== Biblical viewpoint ===
Sheba is mentioned in the Book of Genesis as being the son of Joktan, who is in turn the son of Eber. Hence, he is a descendant of Noah through Noah's son Shem. Meanwhile, the Generations of Noah mention that Sheba (spelled here with samekh as Seba) is a son of Jokshan, hence making him a grandson of Abraham and his spouse Keturah. There are several possible reasons for this confusing twist of genealogies. One theory is that the Sabaeans established many colonies to control the trade routes and the large number of their colonies confused the ancient Israelites, as their ethnology was less racially-based and more based on geography and politics. Another theory suggests that the Sabaeans hailed from the region of the Levant and established their kingdom on the ruins of the Minaeans.

=== Islamic viewpoint ===
The Arabs believe that Sheba, known in Arabic as Saba', is the son of Yashjub, who is in turn a son of Ya'rub, the son of Qahtan. Some Muslim scholars including Ibn Ishaq have brought forward that the real name of Saba' was 'Abd al-Shams ibn Yashjub. His sons are then believed to be Himyar ibn Saba' and Kahlan ibn Saba', who were the progenitors of the Himyarites and Kahlan respectively. There is also a Hadith which narrates that Saba' himself had ten sons (including the aforementioned two).

=== Historicity ===
Christian J. Robin and Jérémie Schiettecatte have found that the genealogical origins of an ultimate ancestor named Sheba, described in the Book of Idols of Hisham ibn al-Kalbi, identified as the third descendant of Qahtan (a mythical ancestor of the Southern Arabs), was a later, speculative reconstruction deduced from vague memories of geographical proximities and political alliances.

== Sheba in the Islamic tradition ==
Sheba is believed to have been a monotheist and a wise king in Islamic tales. According to the traditional account, it was revealed to Sheba through a vision in his dreams that a Prophet would be coming many years after him.

Afterwards, Sheba composed a series of poems dedicating his anticipation for the coming of this Prophet, later revealed to be Muhammad. One of such poems was supposedly preserved:

After Qahtan a prophet will rule, pious, humble, the very best of mankind.

He will be named Ahmad, and I wish I could be given a year to live after his coming, to support him and award him my aid with all fully armed warriors and all marksmen.

When he appears, become his helpers, and let he who meets him pass on my greeting!

== See also ==
- Qahtan
- Joktan
- Sabaeans
- Himyarite Kingdom
- List of rulers of Saba' and Himyar

== Sources ==
- Schiettecatte, Jérémie (2024). "Sabaʾ". Thematic Dictionary of Ancient Arabia.
