= Al-Zaffa =

Arab tribe

Al-Zaffa Clan عشيرة الزففة
- Branch of (Al-Ahmadah) Arab tribe
- Ethnicity: Arab
- Location: Levant - Balqa
- Descended from: Qahtan, Hijaz
- Language: Arabic
- Religion: Islam

The Al-Zaffa Clan is one of the Arabian branches of the Al-Ahmadah clan of Balqawia in the Levant, and their lineage is traced to Khozam bin Billy bin Amr, a Qahtan, from Hijaz, (Yemen).

== Branches (tribes) ==
- Al-Amian
- Al-Hamisat
- Al-Basalsh
- Al-Awaimer
- Al-Talafih
- Al-Bloosh
