= Ophir =

Biblical port famous for its wealth

Ophir (/ˈoʊfər/; Hebrew: אוֹפִיר, Modern: ʼŌfīr, Tiberian: ʼŌp̄īr) is a port or region mentioned in the Bible, famous for its wealth. Its existence is attested to by an inscribed pottery shard found at Tell Qasile (in modern-day Tel Aviv) in 1946, dating to the eighth century BC, which reads "gold of Ophir to/for Beth-Horon [...] 30 shekels". (Note: Beth-Horon probably refers to the ancient city 35 km south of Tell Qasile; another interpretation is that Beth-Horon means 'the temple of Horon', (a Canaanite deity also known as Hauron), see Lipiński (2004, p. 197)) The location of Ophir is unknown, though the find confirms it as a real place which exported gold.

== Biblical and apocryphal references ==
Ophir in Genesis 10 (the Table of Nations) is said to be the name of one of the sons of Joktan. (Note: This is also stated in 1 Chronicles 1:22) The Books of Kings and Chronicles tell of a joint expedition to Ophir by King Solomon and the Tyrian king Hiram I from Ezion-Geber, a port on the Red Sea, which brought back large amounts of gold, precious stones and "algum wood", and of a later failed expedition by king Jehoshaphat of Judah. (Note: The first expedition is described in 1 Kings 9:28; 10:11; 1 Chronicles 29:4; 2 Chronicles 8:18; 9:10, the failed expedition of Jehoshaphat in 1 Kings 22:48) The famous '"gold of Ophir" appears in several other books of the Hebrew Bible: in particular, Isaiah 13:12 refers to the "golden wedge of Ophir". (Note: Book of Job 22:24; 28:16; Psalm 45:9; Isaiah 13:12)

In the Septuagint, other variants of the name are mentioned: Ōpheír, Sōphír, Sōpheír and Souphír.

The New Testament apocryphal book Cave of Treasures contains a passage:

"And the children of Ophir, that is, Send, appointed to be their king Lophoron, who built Ophir with stones of gold; now, all the stones that are in Ophir are of gold."

== Theorized locations ==
=== Possible ancient trade routes ===
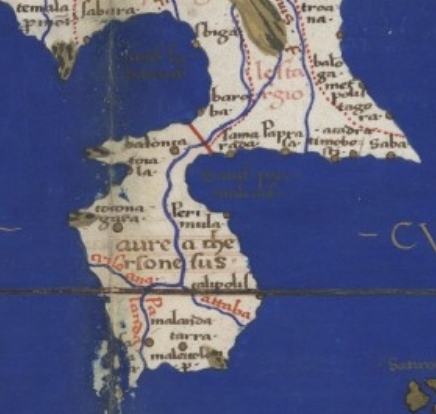
"Aurea Chersonesus", written in brown, at the southern tip of Ptolemy's province of "India beyond the Ganges", See complete image here.

==== Sumatra and Malay Peninsula ====
The 1st-century historian Josephus, in his "Antiquities of the Jews" (8.6.4), identified Ophir as "the Aurea Chersonesus, which belongs to India". "Aurea Chersonesus" (Χρυσῆ Χερσόνησος) is Greco-Latin for "Golden Peninsula". At that time, India was thought to comprise not just the Indian subcontinent, but also Indochina and Indonesia. Hence, in his Geography, the nearly contemporaneous geographer Ptolemy lists these additional lands within the province of "India beyond the Ganges". Ptolemy therein identifies exactly where this Golden Peninsula is, centering it in Malaysia, perhaps also extending somewhat into Sumatra. In particular, Ptolemy mentions a "golden river" (Χρυσοάνα ποταμος) somewhat south of the archaeological site of the Bujang Valley (Βήσυγγα ἐμπόριον), and in the vicinity of the "Palandos river" (Παλάνδος ποταμος) (the modern Pahang region, also common in the derived toponyms surrounding Kuala Lumpur). These areas are indeed famous for gold. Indeed, the longest-lasting name for Sumatra, Svarṇa, which also means "gold," may have derived directly from the word Ophir, by a means similar to the Classical Greek pronunciation displayed in the Septuagint: "Soophaara"/"Souphir" (Σωφηρα/Σουφιρ).

Europeans, arriving later, consequently renamed mythologically-famous 'golden' Mount Ledang near Malacca, Malaysia, as Mount Ophir.

==== Sri Lanka ====
The 10th-century lexicographer David ben Abraham al-Fasi identified Ophir with Serendip, the old Persian name for Sri Lanka (aka Ceylon).

==== India ====
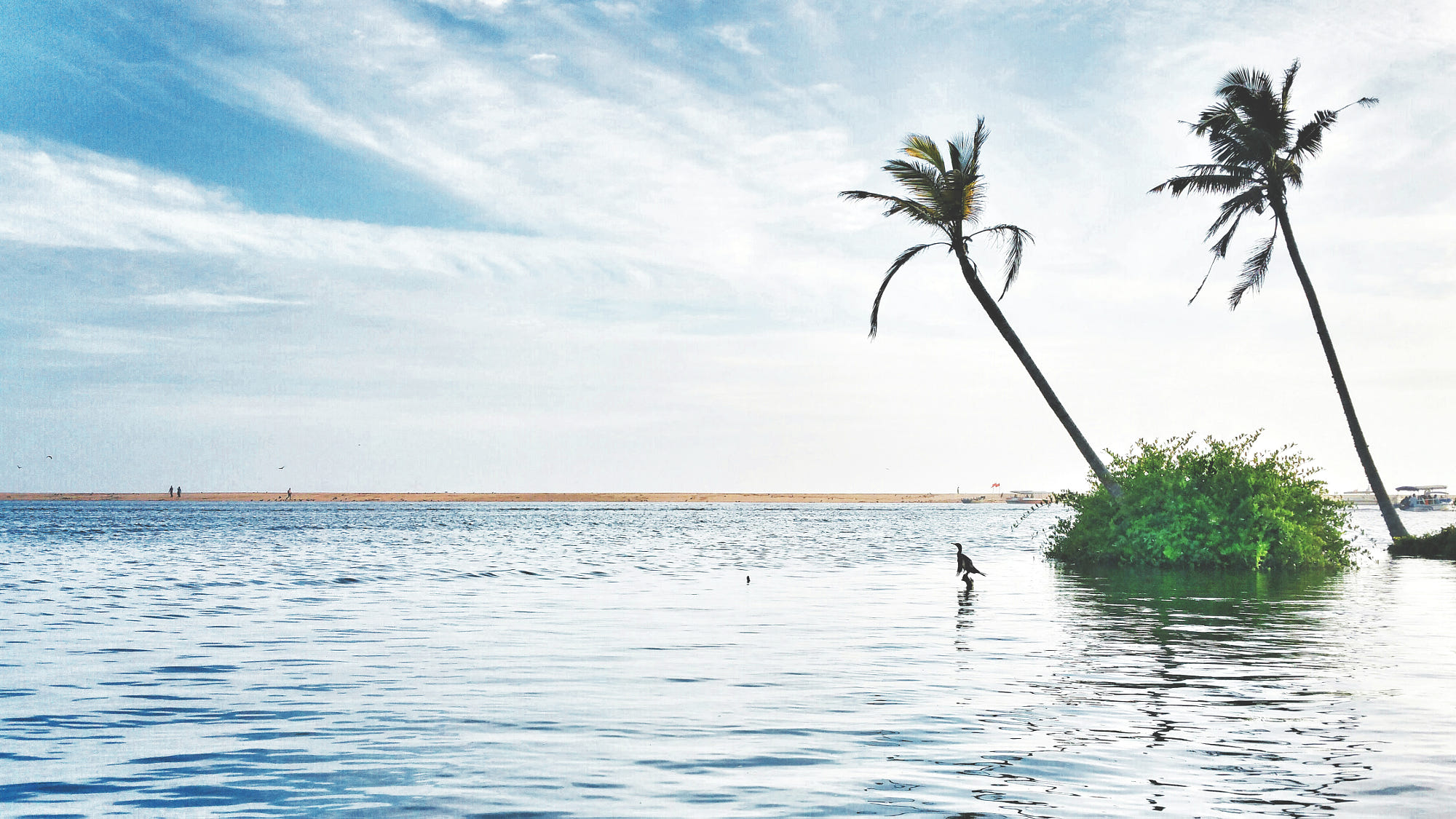
Poovar is often identified with Ophir

A Dictionary of the Bible by Sir William Smith, published in 1863, notes the Hebrew word for parrot Thukki, derived from the Classical Tamil for peacock Thogkai and Sinhalese "tokei", joins other Classical Tamil words for ivory, cotton-cloth and apes preserved in the Hebrew Bible. This theory of Ophir's location on southern Indian Coast is further supported by other historians.

The most likely location on the coast of Kerala conjectured to be Ophir is Poovar in Thiruvananthapuram District (though some Indian scholars also suggest Beypore as a possible location).

Earlier in the 19th century, Max Müller and other scholars identified Ophir with Abhira, near the Indus River in modern-day state of Gujarat, India. According to Benjamin Walker Ophir is said to have been a town of the Abhira tribe.

In Jewish tradition, Ophir is often associated with Uvari, a village in the Indian state of Tamil Nadu, (Note: Fourteenth-century biblical commentator, Nathanel ben Isaiah, writes: "And Ophir, and Havilah, and Jobab (Gen. 10:29), these are the tracts of countries in the east, being those of the first clime," and which first clime, according to al-Biruni, the sub-continent of India falls entirely therein.) named for one of the sons of Joktan. Ibn Sa'd says in his Kitab at-Tabaqat al-Kabir that the Indians, the Sindhis and the Bindis are the descendants of Yufir (Ophir).

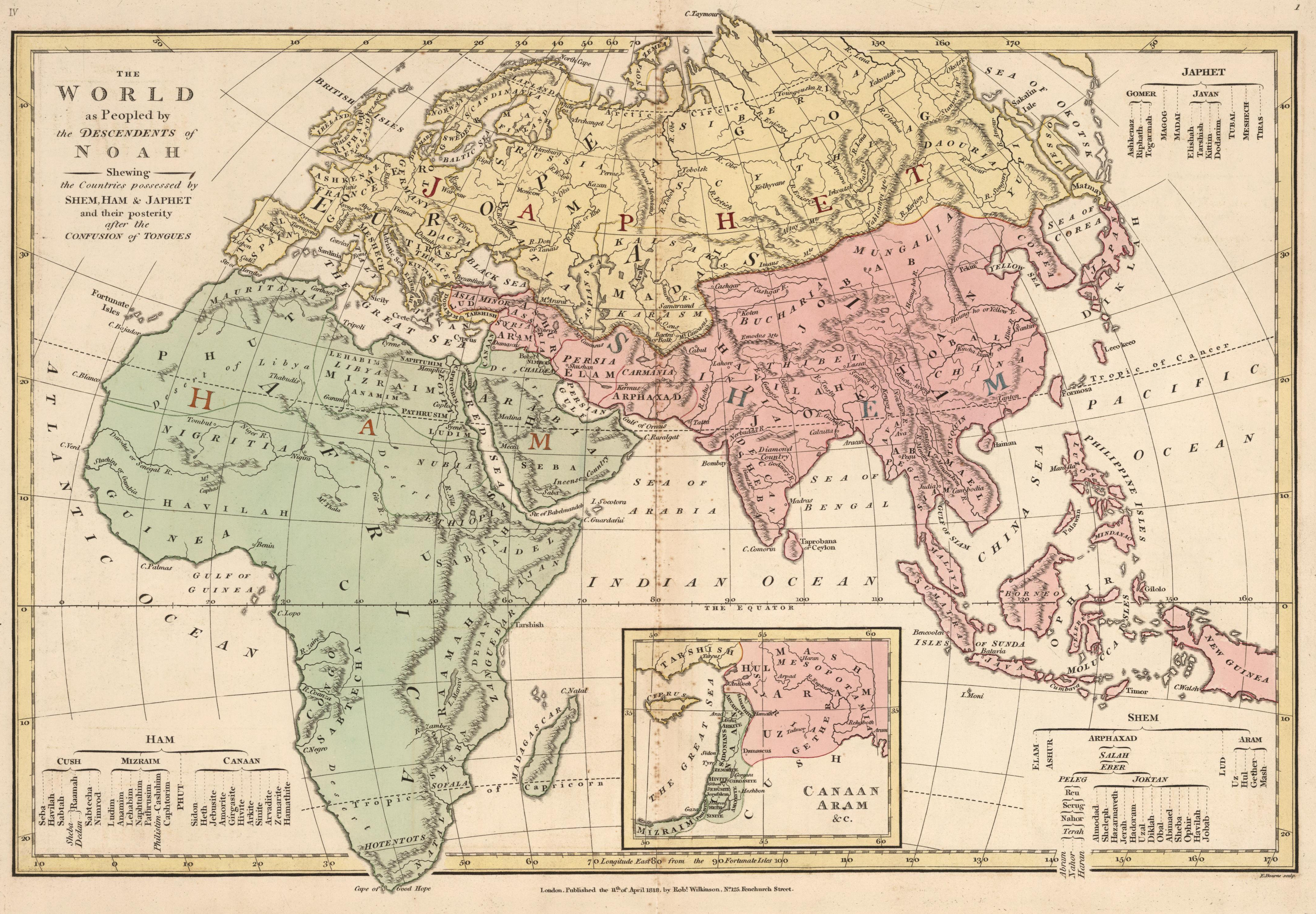
Robert Wilkinson's 1823 map of the descendants of Noah's sons which identifies Ophir with Indonesia

==== Ryukyu Islands ====
In Tomo III (1519–1522), pages 112–138, of the book Colección general de documentos relativos a las Islas Filipinas existentes en el Archivo de Indias de Sevilla, found in the General Archive of the Indies in Spain, Document No. 98, which is based on known Portuguese trade routes, makes no mention of the Philippines because it predates the discovery of the Philippines by the Spanish, and is subtitled "These are the places and ports and the main islands that exist from the Cape of Good Hope to the Leyquios, which is what has been discovered the most so far and what is most known in Portugal", describes how to locate the land of Ophir. The navigational guide starts from the Cape of Good Hope in Africa to India, Burma, Sumatra, the Maluku Islands, Borneo, Sulu, China, then finally Ophir, or the Lequios Islands, as in the document's subtitle, which is an older name for the Ryukyu Islands. These directions were misrepresented by Lone District of Santa Rosa Representative Danilo Fernandez in 2023, who suggested Ophir as the desirable name for the Philippines.

==== Africa ====
Biblical scholars, archaeologists and others have tried to determine the exact location of Ophir. Vasco da Gama's companion Tomé Lopes reasoned that Ophir would have been the ancient name for Great Zimbabwe in Zimbabwe, the main center of southern African trade in gold in the Renaissance period — though the ruins at Great Zimbabwe are now dated to the medieval era, long after Solomon is said to have lived. The identification of Ophir with Sofala in Mozambique was mentioned by Milton in Paradise Lost (11:399-401), among many other works of literature and science.

Another, more serious, possibility is the African shore of the Red Sea, Gulf of Aden or Somali Sea, with the name perhaps being derived from the ancient city of Opone in modern day Somalia or from Afar people living in the Danakil desert (Ethiopia, Eritrea) between Adulis and Djibouti.

Afri was a Latin name used to refer to the Carthaginians, who dwelt in North Africa, in modern-day Tunisia. This name, that later gave the rich Roman province of Africa and the subsequent medieval Ifriqiya, from which the name of the continent Africa is ultimately derived, seems to have referred to a native Libyan tribe originally, however, see Terence for discussion. The name is usually connected with Phoenician afar, "dust", but a 1981 hypothesis has asserted that it stems from the Berber word ifri (plural ifran) meaning "cave", in reference to cave dwellers. This is proposed to be the origin of Ophir as well.

==== Mahd adh Dhahab, Arabia ====
In 1976, the United States Department of Interior announced that a team formed by the United States Geological Survey together with experts from Saudi Arabia believes it has "a fairly airtight case” that Mahd adh Dhahab, or Cradle of Gold, in Saudi Arabia is the biblical Ophir. As evidence, the team states that "there are huge quantities of waste rock left behind by ancient miners, approximately a million tons, and that it has an average gold content of sixteenths of an ounce per ton, indicating that the mined ore must have been richer. From sampling old slopes and from production figures during the 1939 to 1954 period when the mine was reactivated to extract gold and silver, the geological survey scientists estimated that in biblical times much gold must have been found at or near the surface." Moreover, Mahd adh Dhahab is "within range of Israel's transport capability," and it "could easily have been known to Solomon or his advisers because it lies on a north‐south trade route that has run to Aqaba for some 4,000 years." Their conclusion is that "Mand adh Dhahab [sic] could have produced 34 tons of gold in ancient times and was the biblical Ophir."

=== Inspiration or named after ===
==== Americas ====
In a letter written in May 1500, Peter Martyr claimed that Christopher Columbus identified Hispaniola with Ophir.

The theologian Benito Arias Montano (1571) proposed finding Ophir in the name of Peru, reasoning that the native Peruvians were thus descendants of Ophir and Shem.

The California Gold Rush boomtown, Ophir, was renamed after "the biblical source of Solomon's treasure."

Ophir, Oregon, is an unincorporated community on the coast in Curry County.

==== Australia and New Zealand ====
The site of the discovery of the first payable gold deposit in Australia is known as Ophir, as is gold-mining settlement of Ophir, in Otago, New Zealand.

The discovery of payable gold at Ophir occurred in 1851 and initiated the Australian gold rushes.

==== Solomon Islands ====
After their discovery by Europeans in 1568 by Spanish navigator Álvaro de Mendaña, the Solomon Islands were subsequently referred to as Islas Salomón (Solomon Islands) by others following reports of his voyage optimistically conflated with stories of King Solomon, believing them to be Ophir.

==== Mars ====
Ophir Chasma, named after the biblical Ophir, is a canyon making up part of the Valles Marineris canyon system on Mars.

== See also ==
- India (Bible)
- Tarshish, another Biblical location providing Solomon with riches.
- Karl Mauch, an explorer who inadvertently discovered Great Zimbabwe when searching for Ophir.
- Land of Punt

== Bibliography ==
- Lipiński, Edward (2004), Itineraria Phoenicia Studia Phoenicia 18, Peeters Publishers, ISBN 978-90-429-1344-8
- Mahdi, Waruno (1999), "The Dispersal of Austronesian boat forms in the Indian Ocean", in Roger Blench; Matthew Spriggs (eds.), Archaeology and Language III; Artefacts, languages and texts, Routledge, pp. 144–179, ISBN 0-415-10054-2
- Schroff, Wifred H. (1912), The Periplus of the Erythræan Sea: Travel and Trade in the Indian Ocean, New York: Longmans, Green, and Company
- (fr) Quatremère (1861), Mémoire sur le pays d’Ophir, in Mélanges d'histoire, Ducrocq, Paris, p. 234 (read @ Archive).

For many references and a comprehensive outline of the products exported from Muziris, Ariake &c. cf. George Menachery ed. The St. Thomas Christian Encyclopaedia of India, 1973, 1982, 2009.
