= Nethanel ben Isaiah =

Yemenite Jewish rabbi, Biblical commentator and poet

Nethanel ben Isaiah (fl. 14th century) was a Yemenite Jewish rabbi, Biblical commentator and poet of the fourteenth century. He is best known as the author of a homiletic commentary on the Torah entitled Nur al-Zulm wa-Mashbah al-Hikm, translated into Hebrew as Sefer Me'or ha-Afelah (Hebrew: ספר מאור האפלה).

== His work ==
The first notice of this work was given by Jacob Saphir, who saw a manuscript of it at Hirbah, a small town in Yemen, in 1863. But the beginning of the manuscript was missing, and Saphir's statement that the author's name was Isaiah and that the title was Al-Nur wal-Zulm depends only upon hearsay. Two other manuscripts, one in Berlin and one in the Bodleian Library, bear the author's name, Nethanel ben Isaiah, and the full title of the work, Nur al-Zulm wa-Mashbah al-Hikm wa-Ikhraj al-Ma'ani fi al-Wujud Ba'd al'Adm. Alexander Kohut published a monograph on this work, giving some extracts, under the title "Light of Shade and Lamp of Wisdom" (New York, 1894). This title is given by Kohut as the translation of the Arabic title, though "Light out of Darkness" would be a more fitting translation, since Nethanel's introduction shows that his object was to comment on the obscure passages so as to make sure that their meanings should not escape the student.

Nethanel began his work on the 15th of Tammuz, 1640 of the Seleucidan era (June 23, 1328). Its references to Al-Yemen, Sanaa, and Aden make it appear probable that he wrote it in Yemen, although Steinschneider doubts this. It is written in a mixture of Arabic and Hebrew, and the nature of the work is more midrashic than exegetical. Nethanel quotes both Talmudim and the Targumim, but he is chiefly influenced by the Midrash Rabbah. Of the post-Talmudic authors, he mentions (besides the Geonim and Masoretes) Ibn Janah, Nathan ben Jehiel (under the designation of "the author of the "Arukh"), and especially Maimonides, who was the paramount authority among the Yemenites and from whom he merely copied long passages. Finally, he mentions such Arabic and Greek sources as the Almagest, al-Farabi, and Plato. Nethanel's commentary comprises explanations according to the numerical value of the letters (gematria), some philological notes, and polemical flings at both Christianity and Islam: for instance, in his commentary on Genesis 17:20 he designates Muhammad the "madman" ("meshugga").

Nethanel calls the five books of the Pentateuch (1) Sefer ha-Yashar, (2) Sefer Mekilta, (3) Torat Kohanim, (4) Homesh ha-Pequdim, and (5) Mishneh Torah, and he gives an Aramaic mnemonic formula for the weekly lessons; he is followed in both cases by Mansur al-Dhamari in his Siraj al-'Uqul. Nethanel illustrated his commentary with numerous figures and diagrams—e.g., of the Cave of Machpelah, the altar, the candlestick, etc. He inserted in his work three Hebrew poems, two of which were published by Kohut in his above-mentioned "Light of Shade and Lamp of Wisdom." Nethanel is often quoted under the designation of "ibn Yesha'yah" by Mansur al-Dhamari and by Daud al-Lawani in his philosophical commentary on the Pentateuch entitled al-Wajiz al-Mujna.
