= Shem =

Biblical figure, son of Noah

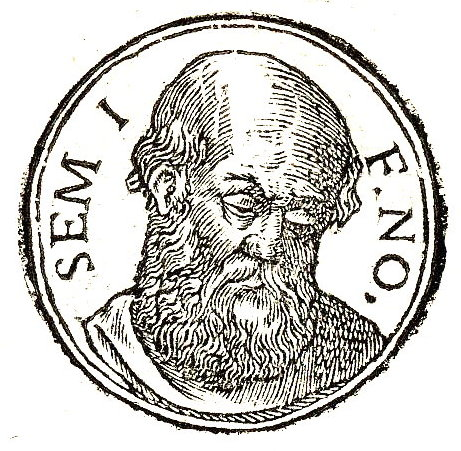
- Portrait from Promptuarium Iconum Insigniorum (1553) by Guillaume Rouillé
- Children: Elam; Ashur; Arphaxad; Lud; Aram
- Father: Noah
- Family: Japheth and Ham (brothers)

Shem (/ʃɛm/; Hebrew: שֵׁם, romanized: Šēm; Arabic: سَام, romanized: Sām) (Note: Greek: Σήμ, romanized: Sḗm; Ge'ez: ሴም, romanized: Sēm) is one of the sons of Noah in the Bible (Genesis 5–11 and 1 Chronicles 1:4).

The children of Shem are Elam, Ashur, Arpachshad (or Arphaxad), Lud and Aram, in addition to his unnamed daughters. Abraham, the patriarch of Jews, Christians, and Muslims, is one of the descendants of Arphaxad.

In Jewish, Christian, and Islamic traditions, Shem is regarded as the ancestor of various peoples of the Near East, including groups traditionally associated with Arabs, Elamites/Persians, Assyrians, and others.

In medieval and early modern European tradition he was considered to be the ancestor of the peoples of Asia, and he gives his name to the title "Semites" formerly given to West Asian peoples.

Islamic literature describes Shem as one of the believing sons of Noah. Some Islamic sources even identify Shem as a prophet in his own right and state that he was the next prophet after his father.

== In the Bible ==
=== Genesis 10 ===
Genesis 10:21 refers to relative ages of Shem and his brother Japheth, but with sufficient ambiguity to have yielded different English translations. The verse is translated in the King James Version as: "Unto Shem also, the father of all the children of Eber, the brother of Japheth the elder, even to him were children born." However, the New American Standard Bible gives: "Also to Shem, the father of all the children of Eber, and the older brother of Japheth, children were born".

According to Genesis 10:22–31 (Jewish Publication Society translation of 1917):

22 The sons of Shem: Elam, and Asshur, and Arpachshad, and Lud, and Aram. 23 And the sons of Aram: Uz, and Hul, and Gether, and Mash. 24 And Arpachshad begot Shelah; and Shelah begot Eber. 25 And unto Eber were born two sons; the name of the one was Peleg; for in his days was the earth divided; and his brother's name was Joktan. 26 And Joktan begot Almodad, and Sheleph, and Hazarmaveth, and Jerah; 27 and Hadoram, and Uzal, and Diklah; 28 and Obal, and Abimael, and Sheba; 29 and Ophir, and Havilah, and Jobab; all these were the sons of Joktan. 30 And their dwelling was from Mesha, as thou goest toward Sephar, unto the mountain of the east. 31 These are the sons of Shem, after their families, after their tongues, in their lands, after their nations. 32 These are the families of the sons of Noah, after their generations, in their nations; and of these were the nations divided in the earth after the flood.

=== Genesis 11 ===
Genesis 11:10 records that Shem was 100 years old at the birth of Arphaxad, two years after the flood; and that he lived for another 500 years after this, making his age at death 600 years.

Excerpts from Genesis 11:10–27 (Jewish Publication Society translation of 1917) read:

'Shem was a hundred years old, and begot Arpachshad two years after the flood. ... Arpachshad lived five and thirty years, and begot Shelah. 13 And Arpachshad lived after he begot Shelah ... Shelah lived thirty years, and begot Eber. ... Eber lived four and thirty years, and begot Peleg. ... Peleg lived thirty years, and begot Reu. ... Reu lived two and thirty years, and begot Serug. '... Serug lived thirty years, and begot Nahor. ... Nahor lived nine and twenty years, and begot Terah. ... Terah lived seventy years, and begot Abram, Nahor, and Haran. ... and Haran begot Lot.

== In later Jewish sources ==
Geographic identifications for the Sons of Noah (Flavius Josephus, c. 100 AD); Shem's sons are in green.

The 1st-century historian Flavius Josephus told a legendary, non-scriptural account that Shem's five sons were the progenitors of the nations of Elam, Assyria, Chaldea, Lydia, and Levantine, respectively.

According to some Jewish traditions (e.g., B. Talmud Nedarim 32b:6; Genesis Rabbah 26:3; Genesis Rabbah 56:10; Leviticus Rabbah 25:6; Numbers Rabbah 4:8.), Shem is believed to have been Melchizedek, King of Salem, whom Abraham is recorded to have met after the Battle of the Four Kings.

A rabbinic document that surfaced in the 17th century, claiming to be the lost Book of Jasher, provides some names not found in any other source.

== In the New Testament ==
Shem (or Sem) features in Luke's genealogy of Jesus Christ in Luke 3:36: "Arphaxad, who was the son of Shem, who was the son of Noah ...". (Note: The 1611 King James Version has "Sem".) Matthew's genealogy commences with Abraham and therefore Shem is not mentioned.

== In Islam ==
=== Sunni Islam ===
Shem is regarded by scholars as the successor to Noah, receiving prophetic knowledge, enlightenment, and leadership of his people. Shem was also one of the people whom God had Jesus resurrect as a sign to the Children of Israel. Early Islamic historians like Ibn Ishaq and Ibn Hisham always included Shem's name in the genealogy of Muhammad.

=== Shi'a Islam ===
In a Shiite tradition Imam Ja'far al-Sadiq has narrated to his companions that Jibrael visited Noah close to the time of his death, relaying God's message: "Oh Noah! Your prophethood has expired and your days are complete, so look to the Great Name, the inheritance and effects of the knowledge of prophethood, and hand these over to your son, Sam (Shem), for I do not leave the Earth except that there is a knowledgeable one by which obedience to Me (God) can be recognized..."

== In Gnosticism ==
The Paraphrase of Shem, which contains ideas unique to other Gnostic scriptures, states that Shem was the first being on Earth. Unlike traditional Sethian literature, Seth is not seen as the father of the followers of Gnosticism, rather it is Shem, who receives a divine revelation from a spiritual savior named Derkedeas. Shem later helps bring his universal teaching of secret knowledge to humanity before the forces of darkness attempt to destroy the world with a great flood.

== In Mandaeism ==
In Mandaean scriptures such as the Ginza Rabba and Qulasta, Shem is referred to as Šum (or Shum; pronounced in Modern Mandaic as Šom (Shom)). Shem is sometimes considered to be the progenitor of the Mandaeans and a prophet.

== Family tree ==
The following family tree contains information from the Hebrew Bible, without data from any other sources.

Shem
Elam	Ashur	Arpachshad	Lud	Aram
Salah	Uz	Hul	Gether	Mash
Eber
Peleg	Joktan
Reu
Almodad; Sheleph; Hazarmaveth; Jerah; Hadoram; Uzal; Diklah; Obal; Abimael; Sheba; Ophir; Havilah; Jobab
Serug
Nahor
Terah
Abraham	Sarah	Nahor	Haran

== In popular culture ==
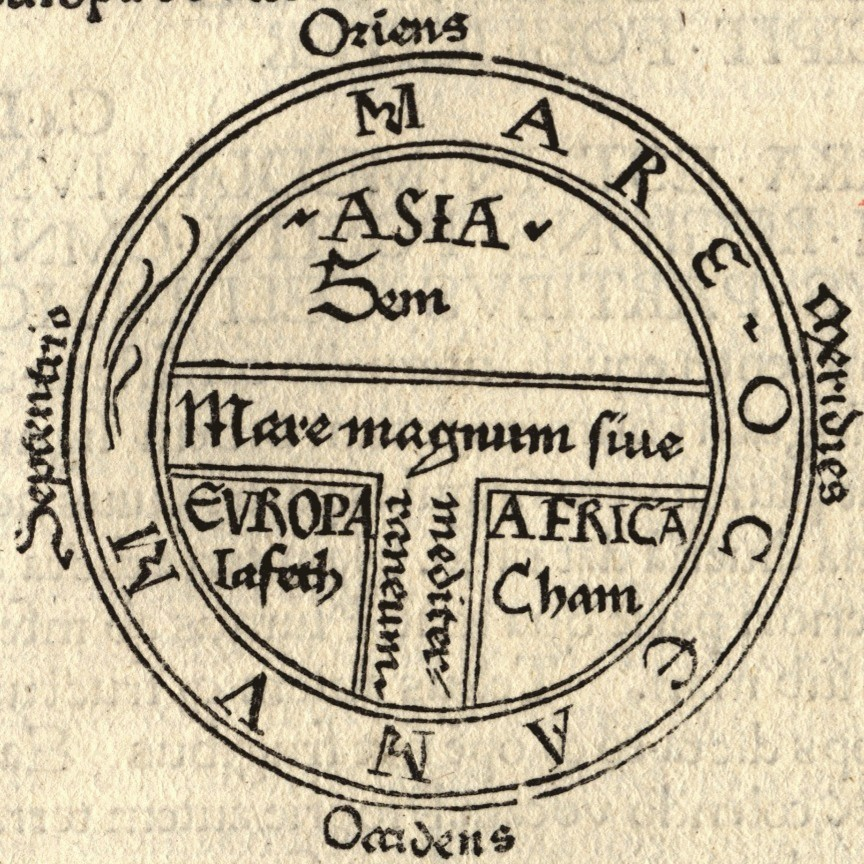
This T and O map, from the first printed version of Isidore's Etymologiae (Augsburg 1472), identifies the three known continents (Asia, Europe and Africa) as respectively populated by descendants of Sem (Shem), Iafeth (Japheth) and Cham (Ham).

Year	Film	Actor	Note
1928	Noah's Ark	Malcolm Waite	Second role
1936	The Green Pastures	Ray Martin	All-black cast
1966	The Bible: In the Beginning...	Peter Heinze	
1988	Stowaways on the Ark	Stefan Gossler	Named as 'Sam'
1999	Noah's Ark (miniseries)	Mark Bazeley	
2007	Noah's Ark	Oscar Cheda	Animation film
2014	Noah	Gavin Casalegno (juvenile)	
2014	Noah	Douglas Booth (adult)	
2015	The Ark	Michael Fox	

== See also ==
- Wives aboard the Ark

== Bibliography ==
Kishik, David (2018). The Book of Shem: On Genesis before Abraham. Stanford University Press. ISBN 9781503606760.
