= David ben Abraham al-Fasi =

11th-century Moroccan Jewish lexicographer

David ben Abraham al-Fasi (Hebrew: דוד בן אברהם אלפאסי) was a medieval Jewish, Moroccan lexicographer and grammarian from Fez, living in the second half of the 10th century (died before 1026 CE), who eventually settled in the Land of Israel where he is believed to have composed his magnum opus. He belonged to the sect of the Karaites, and displayed skills as a grammarian and commentator.

Al-Fasi was the author of Kitāb Jāmiʿ al-Alfāẓ ("The Book of Collected Meanings"), one of the earliest known Judeo-Arabic Dictionaries, a work which defines words in the Hebrew Bible. It is the first dictionary of biblical Hebrew. He classifies the roots according to the number of their letters, as did the grammarians prior to Judah Hayyūj. The book, or lexicon, is recognized for explaining difficult words in the Hebrew language, such as the word ha-qayiṣ (הקיץ) found in 2 Samuel 16:2, and where he explains the word as meaning, specifically, "dried figs and raisins," instead of simply "summer fruits."

== Method of elucidation ==
Scholars have pointed out that al-Fasi, in all the controversies between the Rabbinites (rabbanim) and the Karaites (maskilim), invariably sides with the latter, often criticizing the views of the former. His method is concise, bringing down the definition of words as understood by his contemporaries, without mentioning them by name. The only authority that he mentions by name (twice) is Saadia Gaon, whom he calls al-Fayyumi. Although in many cases, al-Fasi's method of elucidation is similar to that of Saadia Gaon, in other areas of elucidation, he does not withhold his criticism from Saadia Gaon's method without naming him explicitly. Early rabbinic sources, such as the targums (Aramaic translations) of Onqelos and of Jonathan bar Uzziel are alluded to by his use of such titles as al-Targum, al-Suriani and al-Mutarjim.

In Hebrew grammar, al-Fasi is known to have distinguished between the “šoršiyyot” (triliterals) and the “šimušiyyot” (theoretical roots; servile letters) but gave to them no Hebrew abbreviations.

Al-Fasi's dictionary was later abridged by the philologist Levi ben Yefet, a native of Jerusalem, and his abridgment was, in turn, epitomized by ʿAlī ibn Sulaymān, also of Jerusalem.

== Anecdotes on Jewish history ==
Al-Fasi records that Jews, following the Muslim conquest of Jerusalem in 636, were permitted to pray at the Gates of the Temple Mount, which had been denied to them since Hadrian's decree banned them from Aelia Capitolina (Roman Jerusalem) in 130 CE.

== Partially preserved works ==
- Translations of the Pentateuch (Mss. Brit. Lib. Or. 2403 [§ 304], 2494 [§ 318], fols. 1r–30v, 2495 [§ 306], 2561 [§ 305], fols. 1r–74v, 2562 [§ 307]; JTSA 8916; RNL Yevr.-Arab. I 4803; T-S Ar. 21.133)
- Ecclesiastes and Lamentations (Ms. Brit. Lib. Or. 2552 [§ 299], fols. 90r–141v))
