= Hazarmaveth =

Biblical figure

Hazarmaveth (Biblical Hebrew: חֲצַרְמָוֶת, Ḥăṣarmāweṯ; Arabic: حضر موت) is the third of thirteen sons of Joktan (or the nation descended from him), who was a son of Eber, son of Selah, son of Arpachshad, son of Shem in the table of the Sons of Noah in Genesis chapter 10 and 1 Chronicles chapter 1 in the Bible. This Table of Nations lists purported founders of neighboring ethnic groups or nations. (Genesis 10:26)

== Etymology ==
Hazarmaveth, also transcribed Hazarmaueth, means "court of death" and is composed of two parts: Hebrew: חֲצַרְ, romanized: ḥaṣar, lit. 'dwelling; court' and מָוֶת māweṯ "death").

Scholars of Semitic languages have related the name to the ancient region of Hadhramaut in Yemen in South Arabia. This is possible, as Joktan has been associated with ancient Yemen. His son Sephar has been identified with the former city Zafar, Yemen, his son Sheba with the ancient kingdom of Sheba, also in Yemen, and his son Havilah with the supposed West Arabian kingdom of Havilah. These identifications seem to support this association with the area.

South Arabia is the homeland of the South Semitic languages. Kamal Salibi proposed an etymology for the name Hadhramaut. He noted that -ūt is a frequent ending for place names in the Ḥadhramaut, and given that "Ḥaḍramūt" is the colloquial pronunciation of the name and also its ancient pronunciation, the correct reading of the name should be "place of ḥḍrm." He thus proposes that the name means "the green place," which is apt for its well-watered wadis whose lushness contrasts with the surrounding high desert plateau.
