= Hadoram =

Hadoram (Hebrew: הֲדוֹרָם Hăḏōrām) is the son of Joktan mentioned in the Book of Genesis of the Hebrew Bible. Noah had three sons: Shem, Ham, and Japheth. One of Shem's sons was Arpachshad. One of Arpachshad's grandsons was Eber. Eber had two sons: Peleg and Joktan.

Joktan had many sons including Hadoram as the Book of Genesis (10:26-30) states:

Yoktan (Joktan) was the father of Almodad, Shelef, Chatzarmaveth, Yerach, Hadoram, Uzal, Diklah, Obhal, Abhimael, Sh'bha, Ophir, Havilah, and Yovav. All these were the sons of Yoktan. Their settlements extended from Meshah toward Sepher, the eastern mountain.

According to Rabbi Aryeh Kaplan's footnotes: "Hadarom: Some interpret this as denoting 'the south.' This was a fortress to the south of (Yemen's) Sanaa (Kesseth HaSofer). See 1 Chronicles 18:10; Zechariah 12:11."

Hadoram was also the name of the son of the king of Hamath, Tou, in 1 Chronicles 18.
