= Reu =

Biblical figure

- רְעוּ
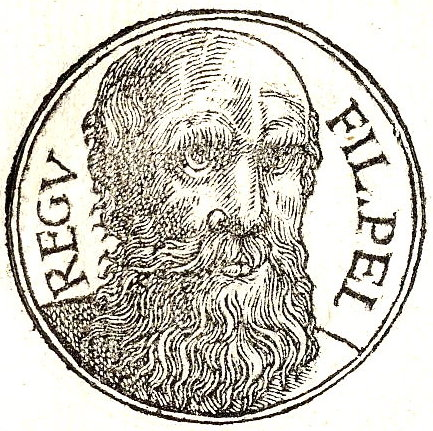
- Reu from Promptuarii Iconum Insigniorum (1553 CE)
- Born: 1788 AM (Masoretic chronology); Ur, Sumer (now in Lower Mesopotamia, Iraq)
- Died: 2027 AM (aged 239) (Masoretic chronology)
- Children: Serug, and other sons and daughters
- Parent(s): Peleg; Lomna

Reu or Ragau (Hebrew: רְעוּ, romanized: Rəʿū; Biblical Greek: Ῥαγαύ, romanized: Rhagaú), according to Genesis in the Hebrew Bible, was the son of Peleg and the father of Serug, thus being Abraham's great-great-grandfather and the ancestor of the Israelites and Ishmaelites.

== In scriptures ==
According to the apocryphal Book of Jubilees, Reu is said to have been born to Peleg and Lomna of Shinar at the time when the Tower of Babel was begun.

And in the three and thirtieth jubilee, in the first year in the second week, Peleg took to himself a wife, whose name was Lomna the daughter of Sina'ar, and she bare him a son in the fourth year of this week, and he called his name Reu; for he said: "Behold the children of men have become evil through the wicked purpose of building for themselves a city and a tower in the land of Shinar".- (10:18)

Reu's wife was Ora, daughter of 'Ûr, (the son of Kesed) (Jubilees 11:1).

According to the Masoretic Text (Genesis 11:18–21), Reu was born when his father Peleg was 30; he was 32 when Serug was born, and lived to the age of 239 (when Abraham was either 18 or 78).

The Septuagint and Samaritan Pentateuch state that his age on fathering Serug was 132, and the Septuagint thus gives age at death as 339.
