= Eber =

Great-grandson of Shem, the son of Noah

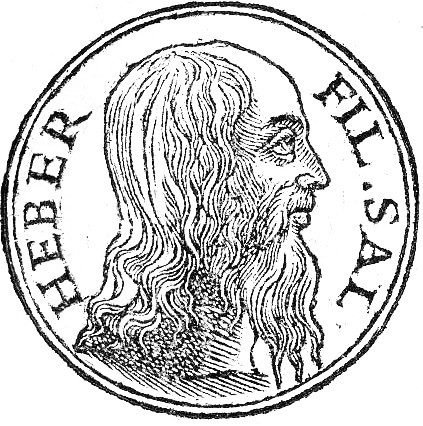
- Eber imagined in the 1553 Promptuarium Iconum Insigniorum
- Children: Peleg; Joktan
- Parent: Selah

Eber (Hebrew: עֵבֶר, romanized: ʿĒḇer; Biblical Greek: Ἔβερ, romanized: Éber; Arabic: عؘابِر, romanized: ʿĀbir) is an ancestor of the Ishmaelites and the Israelites according to the Generations of Noah in the Book of Genesis (Genesis 10–11) and the Books of Chronicles (1 Chronicles 1).

== Lineage ==
Eber (Hebrew: Ever) was a great-grandson of Noah's son Shem and the father of Peleg, born when Eber was 34 years old, and of Joktan. He was the son of Shelah, a distant ancestor of Abraham. According to the Hebrew Bible, Eber died at the age of 464.

In the Septuagint, the name is written as Heber/Eber (῞Εβερ/Ἔβερ), and his father is called Sala (Σαλά/Σάλα). His son is called Phaleg/Phalek (Φαλέγ/Φάλεκ), born when Heber was 34 years old, and he had other sons and daughters. Heber lived to an age of 464 years.

== Name ==
The triliteral root ע־ב־ר, ʕ-b-r, is connected with crossing over and the beyond. Considering that other names for descendants of Shem also stand for places, Eber can also be considered the name of an area, perhaps near Assyria.

Medieval scholars such as Michael the Syrian, Bar Hebraeus, and Agapius of Hierapolis noted that the prevailing view was the Hebrews (Hebrew: עִבְרִיִּים, romanized: ʿIḇriyyim, also derived from the letters ʿ-b-r) had received their name from ʿEber, while others state the name "Hebrew" means "those who cross", a reference to those who crossed the Euphrates with Abram from Ur of the Chaldees to Harran and then Canaan.

In some translations of the New Testament, he is referred to once as Heber/Eber (Luke 3:35, "Biblical Greek: Ἔβερ] the son of Serug, the son of Reu, the son of Peleg, the son of Heber, the son of Selah"). He is distinct from Ḥeber, the grandson of Asher, who is mentioned in Genesis 46:17 and in Numbers 26:45; Ḥeber is חבר with a heth while ʿEber has an ayin.

== Hebrew ==
The 13th-century Muslim historian Abu al-Fida related a tradition about how the patriarch Eber, the great-grandson of Shem, refused to help with the building of the Tower of Babel. As a result, his language was not confused when the tower was abandoned. He and his family alone retained the original Adamic language, which was identified as Hebrew, a language named after ʿEber.

== In Islam ==
In Islam, ʿĀbir ibn Shālakh (Arabic: عابر بن شالخ) is sometimes referred to in classical Islamic writings as the "father" of the "prehistoric, original Arabs" (the ʿArab al-ʿĀriba), who lived in the Arabian Peninsula after the Deluge. ʿEber was also identified with the Muslim prophet Hud by some of the early Muslim authorities, who has a surah named after him in the Quran. Other sources identify the prophet Hud as ʿEber's son.

== See also ==
- ʿApiru
