= Joktan =

Son of Eber in the bible

Joktan (also written as Yoktan; Hebrew: יָקְטָן, Modern: Yŏqṭan, Tiberian: Yāqṭān) was the second of the two sons of Eber (Book of Genesis 10:25; 1 Chronicles 1:19) mentioned in the Hebrew Bible. He descends from Shem, son of Noah.

In the Book of Genesis 10:25 it reads: "And unto Eber were born two sons: the name of one was Peleg; for in his days was the earth divided; and his brother's name was Joktan."

Joktan's sons in the order provided in Genesis 10:26–29, were Almodad, Sheleph, Hazarmaveth, Jerah, Hadoram, Uzal, Diklah, Obal, Abimael, Sheba, Ophir, Havilah, and Jobab.

In Pseudo-Philo's account (ca. 70), Joktan was first made prince over the children of Shem, just as Nimrod and Phenech were princes over the children of Ham and Japheth, respectively. In his version, the three princes command all persons to bake bricks for the Tower of Babel; however, twelve, including several of Joktan's own sons, as well as Abraham and Lot, refuse the orders. Joktan smuggles them out of Shinar and into the mountains, to the annoyance of the other two princes.

== South Arabian narrative ==
A map published by the British academic Harold Dixon during World War I, showing the presence of the Arab tribes in West Asia, 1914

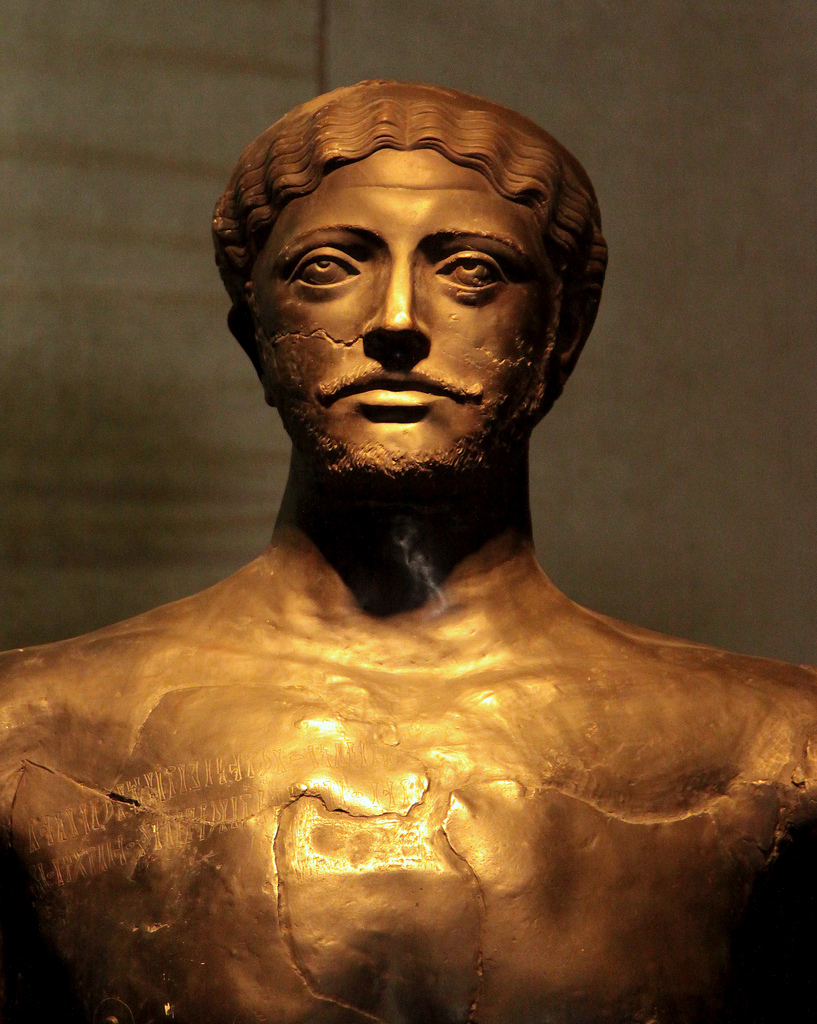
Statue of a South Arabian king. According to Arab genealogy, South Arabians descend from Qahtan who is identified with Joktan.

There is an Arab tradition that Joktan was the progenitor of all the purest tribes of Southern Arabia. Joktan has been identified with Qahtān (Arabic: قحطان), the ancestral figure of Qahtanites, in traditional Arab genealogy. Three of Joktan's sons have connections to South Arabia. Sheba is identified as the ancient South Arabian kingdom of Saba. Hazarmaveth (Biblical Hebrew: חֲצַרְמָוֶת, tr. Ḥăṣarmāweṯ; Arabic: حضرموت) has been identified with the South Arabian region of Hadhramaut and according to various Bible dictionaries, the name "Hazarmaveth" means "court of death" which reflects a meaning similar to the Arabic folk etymologies of the region. Hadoram according to Rabbi Aryeh Kaplan is interpreted as denoting "the south" and it was a fortress to the south of Yemen's Sana'a.

Likewise, the Kebra Nagast claims Joktan as the progenitor of not only Saba but the Habesha people or Ethio-Semites.

== East Asians theory ==
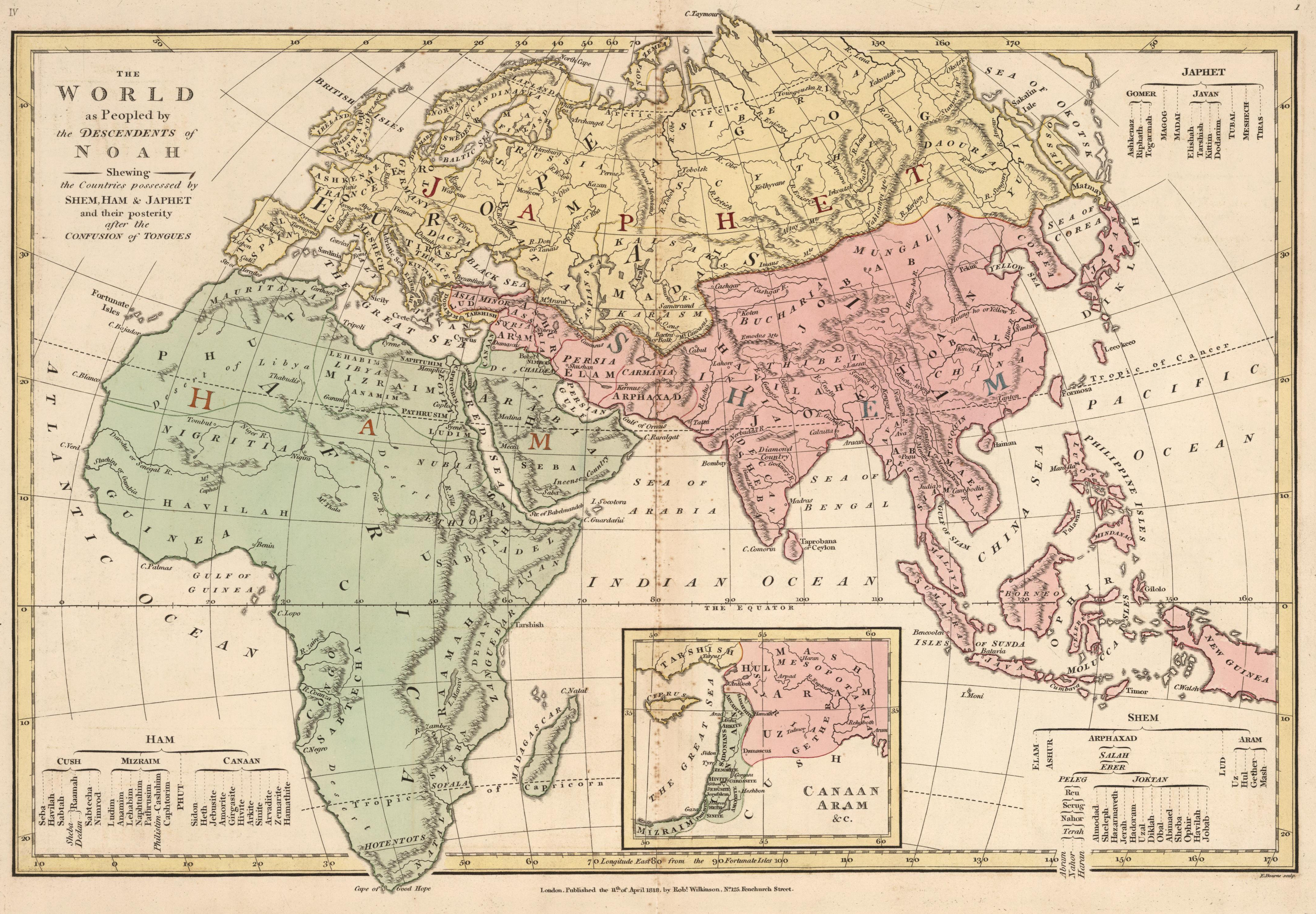
Robert Wilkinson's 1823 map of the descendants of Noah's sons, showing Joktan and his sons as having populated eastern Asia: Havilah is Tibet, Sheba is Deccan, Jobab is Mongolia, Obal is China, Abimael is Indochina, Diklah is Japan, and Ophir is Indonesia, particularly the Maluku Islands.

Theories (based on a literal reading of Genesis 10:30, which states that Joktan's descendants migrated eastward) suggested that Joktan is the progenitor of the east Asians and the indigenous peoples of the Americas. One early proponent of this theory was the theologian Benito Arias Montano, who proposed a link between the names of the Yucatán Peninsula and Joktan, and also between Ophir, Joktan's son, and Peru. Modern proponents of this idea include the young Earth creationist geneticist Nathaniel Jeanson, who identifies him as the progenitor of Y-chromosomal haplogroup K2, whose descendants are found in Central and East Asia.

== See also ==
- Not to be confused with Jokshan
- Qahtanite Tribe.
