= Sheleph =

Biblical character, son of Joktan

Sheleph was a son of Joktan, of the family of Shem. (Book of Genesis 10:26). Sheleph means "drawing out" or "who draws out" (Hitchcock's Bible Dictionary).
