= Almodad =

Biblical patriarch

Almodad (Hebrew: אַלְמוֹדָד ’Almōḏāḏ) was a descendant of Noah and the first named son of Joktan in Genesis 10:26 and 1 Chronicles 1:20. While the Bible has no further history regarding Almodad, this patriarch is considered to be the founder of an Arabian tribe in "Arabia Felix". This is based on the identification of Joktan's other sons, such as Sheba and Havilah, who are both identified as coming from that region.

According to Easton's Bible Dictionary "Almodad" means "immeasurable", however it has also been translated as "not measured", "measure of God", "the beloved," or, "God is beloved", "God is love", and "God is a friend".

Many translations and scholarly works use "Elmodad", including Josephus, Douay–Rheims Bible and the Targum Ps.-Jonathan, which elaborates Gen 10:26 and says "begot Elmodad, who measured the earth with cords."

== See also ==
- List of minor biblical figures, A–K
