= Longevity myths =

Myths related to longevity

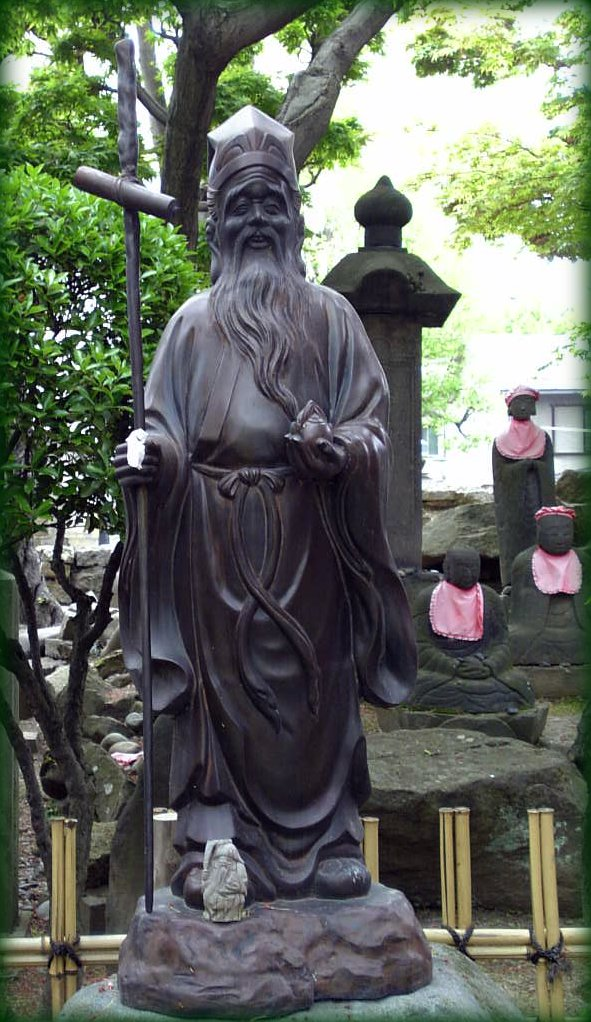
Jurōjin, the Japanese god of longevity, one of the Seven Lucky Gods

Longevity myths are traditions about long-lived people (generally supercentenarians), either as individuals or groups of people, and practices that have been believed to confer longevity, but which current scientific evidence does not support, nor the reasons for the claims. While literal interpretations of such myths may appear to indicate extraordinarily long lifespans, experts believe such figures may be the result of incorrect translations of number systems through various languages, coupled along with the cultural and symbolic significance of certain numbers.

The phrase "longevity tradition" may include "purifications, rituals, longevity practices, meditations, and alchemy" that have been believed to confer greater human longevity, especially in Chinese culture.

Modern science indicates various ways in which genetics, diet, and lifestyle affect human longevity. It also allows us to determine the age of human remains with a fair degree of precision.

The record for the maximum verified lifespan in the modern world is 122 1/2 years for women (Jeanne Calment) and 116 years for men (Jiroemon Kimura). Some scientists estimate that in case of the most ideal conditions people can live up to 127 years. There is also the theoretical possibility that a fortunate combination of mutations could lead to a longer life. Though the lifespan of humans is one of the longest in nature, there are animals that live longer. For example, some individuals of the Galapagos tortoise live more than 175 years, and some individuals of the bowhead whale more than 200 years. Some scientists cautiously suggest that the human body can have sufficient resources to live up to 150 years.

== Longevity claims in religion ==
=== Abrahamic religions ===
Biblical longevity
Name	Masoretic Age	Septuagint Age
Methuselah	969	969
Jared	962	962
Noah	950	950
Adam	930	930
Seth	912	912
Kenan	910	910
Enos	905	905
Mahalalel	895	895
Lamech	777	753
Shem	600	600
Eber	464	404
Cainan	—	460
Arpachshad	438	465
Salah	433	466
Enoch	365	365
Peleg	239	339
Reu	239	339
Serug	230	330
Job	210?	210?
Terah	205	205
Isaac	180	180
Abraham	175	175
Nahor	148	304
Jacob	147	147
Esau	147?	147?
Ishmael	137	137
Levi	137	137
Amram	137	137
Kohath	133	133
Laban	130+	130+
Deborah	130+	130+
Jehoiada	130	130
Sarah	127	127
Miriam	125+	125+
Aaron	123	123
Rebecca	120+	120+
Moses	120	120
Joseph	110	110
Joshua	110	110

==== Judaism ====
Several parts of the Hebrew Bible, including the Torah, Joshua, Job, and Chronicles, mention individuals with very long lifespans, up to the 969 years of Methuselah. The Sefer haYashar narrates that all of the long-lived people belonged to a special class and that Methusaleh was the last member. The aforementioned patriarch lived long enough to preach alongside his great-grandson Noah in the antediluvian world.

==== Christianity ====
Some Christian apologists explain the extreme ages in the Hebrew Bible (or Old Testament) as ancient mistranslations that converted the word "month" to "year", mistaking lunar cycles for solar ones: this would turn an age of 969 years into a more reasonable 969 lunar months, or about 78.3 solar years. Donald Etz says that the Genesis 5 numbers were multiplied by ten by a later editor.

Both these interpretations introduce an inconsistency: they would mean that the ages of the first nine patriarchs at fatherhood, ranging from 62 to 230 years in the manuscripts, would then be transformed into an implausible range such as 5 to 18 1/2 years. Others say that the first list, of only 10 names for 1,656 years, may contain generational gaps, which would have been represented by the lengthy lifetimes attributed to the patriarchs. Nineteenth-century critic Vincent Goehlert suggests the lifetimes "represented epochs merely, to which were given the names of the personages especially prominent in such epochs, who, in consequence of their comparatively long lives, were able to acquire an exalted influence".

Those biblical scholars that teach literal interpretation give explanations for the advanced ages of the early patriarchs. In one view, man was originally to have everlasting life, but as sin was introduced into the world by Adam, its influence became greater with each generation and God progressively shortened man's life. In a second view, before Noah's flood, a "firmament" over the earth (Genesis 1:6–8) contributed to people's advanced ages. The Bible's own (brief) explanation for these ages approaches the question from a different angle, explaining instead the relative shortness of normal lives in Genesis 6:3 (CSB): "And the Lord said, 'My Spirit will not remain with mankind forever, because they are corrupt. Their days will be 120 years.'"

Conservative apologist William Lane Craig believes that the longevity myths should be understood as 'mytho-history', where the ages of culturally significant figures were exaggerated to make a political or theological point. He points to similar practices found in neighboring cultures such as the Babylonians and argues that both Hebrews and Babylonians were aware that human longevity was biologically unfeasible. Similar arguments were made by professor Robert Gnuse.

Here are some more modern examples of Christian longevity claims:

- Scolastica Oliveri is said to have lived in Bivona, Italy, 1448–1578 (age 129–130), according to the archive of Monastero di San Paolo in Bivona located in Palermo.
- Around 1912, the Maharishi of Kailash was said by missionary Sadhu Sundar Singh to be a Christian hermit of over 300 years of age in a Himalayan mountain cave, with whom he spent some time in deep fellowship. Singh said the Maharishi was born in Alexandria, Egypt, and baptized by the nephew of St. Francis Xavier.

==== Islam ====
Ibrahim (إِبْرَاهِيم) was said to have lived to 168–169 years. His wife Sarah is the only woman in the Old Testament whose age is given. She died at 127 (Genesis 23:1). In the Quran, Noah allegedly lived for 950 years with his people.

According to 19th-century scholars, Abdul Azziz al-Hafeed al-Habashi (عبد العزيز الحبشي) lived 673–674 Gregorian years, or 694–695 Islamic years, between 581 and 1276 AH (equivalent to 1185–1859 AD).

In Twelver Shia Islam, Hujjat-Allah al-Mahdi is believed to currently be in Occultation and still alive (age 1157).

=== Buddhism ===
- Vipassī, the twenty-second of twenty-eight Buddhas, lived for either 80,000 or 100,000 years. In Vipassī's time, the longevity of humans was 84,000 years.
- Taṇhaṅkara, the first Buddha, lived for 100,000 years.

=== Falun Gong ===
Chapter 2 of Falun Gong by Li Hongzhi (2001) states,

A person in Japan named Mitsu Taira lived to be 242 years old. During the Tang dynasty in our country, there was a monk called Hui Zhao [慧昭, 526–815] who lived to be 290 [288–289] years old. According to the county annals of Yong Tai in Fujian Province, Chen Jun [陈俊] was born in the first year of Zhong He time (881 AD) under the reign of Emperor Xi Zong during the Tang Dynasty. He died in the Tai Ding time of the Yuan Dynasty (1324 AD), after living for 443 years.

=== Hinduism ===
- The Hindu god Rama is said to have ruled his kingdom Ayodhya for 11,000 years by the time he died according to the Ramayana.
- Rama's father Dasharatha lived for more than 60,000 years according to the Ramayana.
- Bhagiratha did tapas for 1000 deva or god years (360,000 years in Human years) to please Ganga, to gain the release of his 60,000 great-uncles from the curse of saint Kapila. So, Bhagiratha lived for more than 360,000 years.
- The Hindu god Krishna is said to have lived for 125 years and 8 months from 3228 BCE to 3102 BCE. According to Hindu scriptures, the age of Kali Yuga began after he ascended to his abode Vaikuntha.
- Ashwatthama, a hero of the Mahabharatha, is said to be over 6,000 years old and still alive.
- Devraha Baba (died June 19, 1990) claimed to have lived for more than 900 years.
- Trailanga Swami reportedly lived in Kashi since 1737; the journal Prabuddha Bharata puts his birth c. 1607 CE, corresponding to year 1529 of the Shaka era (age 279–280), upon his death in 1887.
- The sadhaka Lokenath Brahmachari reportedly lived 1730–1890 (age 159–160).
- Shivapuri Baba, also known as Swami Govindanath Bharati, was a Hindu saint who purportedly lived from 1826 to 1963, making him allegedly 136–137 years old at the time of his death. He had 18 audiences with Queen Victoria.

=== Jainism ===
Extreme lifespans are ascribed to the Tirthankaras, for instance:

- Neminatha was said to have lived for over 10,000 years before his ascension.
- Naminatha was said to have lived for over 20,000 years before his ascension.
- Munisuvrata was said to have lived for over 30,000 years before his ascension.
- Māllīnātha was said to have lived for over 56,000 years before his ascension.
- Aranatha was said to have lived for over 84,000 years before his ascension.
- Kunthunatha was said to have lived for over 200,000 years before his ascension.
- Shantinatha was said to have lived for over 800,000 years before his ascension.
- Dharmanatha was said to have lived for over 2,500,000 years before his ascension.
- Anantanatha was said to have lived for over 3,500,000 years before his ascension.
- Vimalanatha was said to have lived for over 6,000,000 years before his ascension.
- Vasupujya was said to have lived for over 7,200,000 years before his ascension.
- Shreyansanatha was said to have lived for over 8,400,000 years before his ascension.

=== Sikhism ===
- Baba Sri Chand, the founder of Udasi sect, was said to live 134 years.
- Baba Biram Das, an Udasi saint, is said to have lived for 321 years.

=== Taoism ===
The term xian refers to deified persons who have achieved immortality. The Old Man of the South Pole is a common archetype and symbol for longevity.

=== Theosophy/New Age ===
- Mahavatar Babaji is said to be an "Unascended Master" purportedly many centuries old (said to have been born as early as 203 AD) and is claimed to live in the Himalayas. The Hindu guru Paramhansa Yogananda claimed to have met him and was supposedly one of his disciples.

== Premodern longevity claims ==
=== China ===
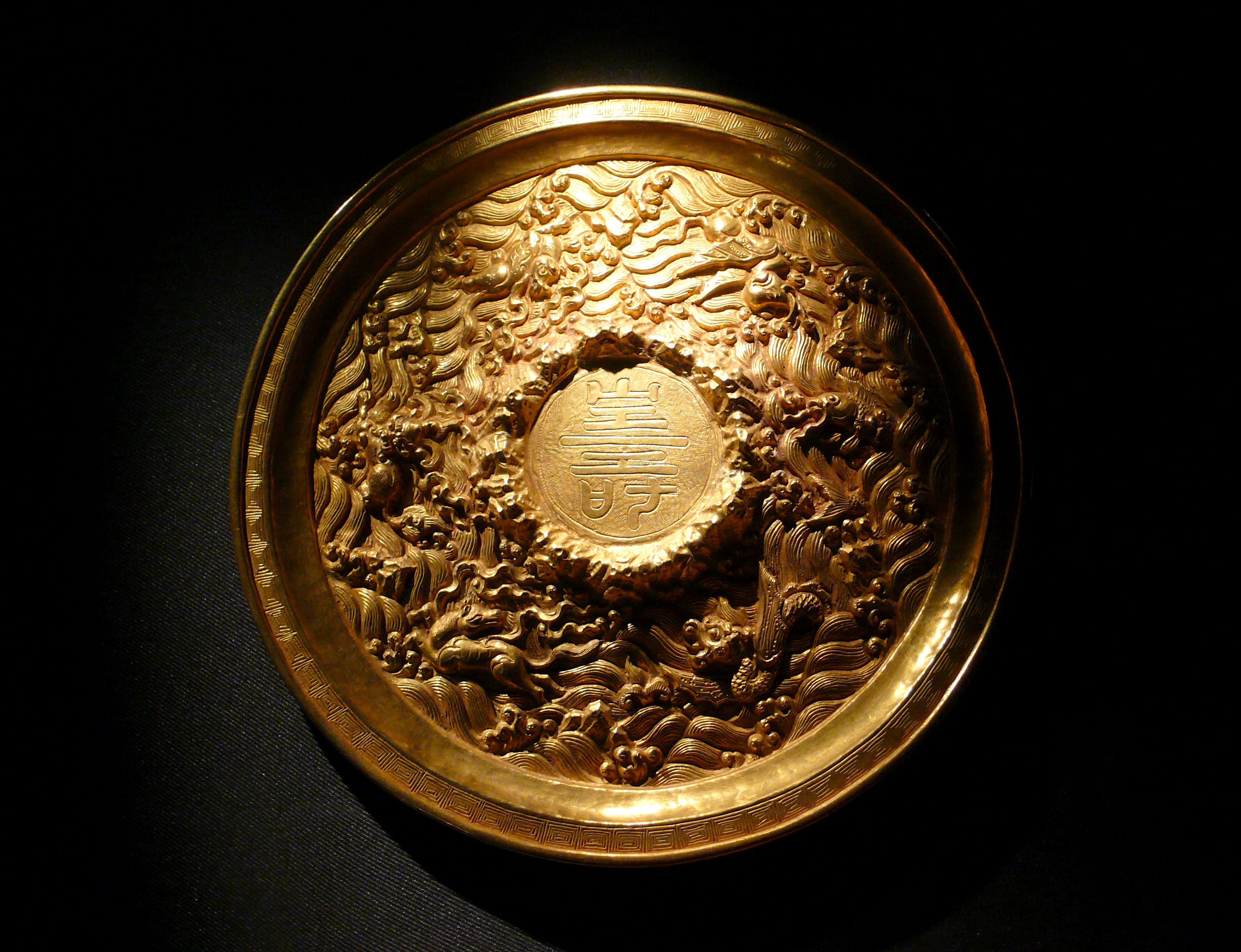
Bronze mirror, with Chinese character of "Longevity" and dragons and clouds decoration. Capital Museum, Beijing, China

- Fu Xi (伏羲) was supposed to have lived for 197 years.
- Lucian wrote about the "Seres" (a Chinese people), claiming they lived for over 300 years.
- Zuo Ci who lived during the Three Kingdoms Period was said to have lived for 300 years.
- In Chinese legend, Peng Zu was believed to have lived for over 800 years. during the Yin Dynasty (殷朝, 16th to 11th centuries BC).

==== Emperors ====
- The Yellow Emperor was said to have lived for 113 years.
- Emperor Yao was said to have lived for 118 years.
- Emperor Shun was said to have lived for 110 years.

=== Egypt ===
The Egyptian historian Manetho, drawing upon earlier sources, begins his Egyptian king list with the Graeco-Egyptian god Hephaestus (Ptah) who "was king for 9,000 years".

=== England ===
- Edgar Ætheling, English prince who was briefly King of England after the death of Harold Godwinson at the Battle of Hastings in late 1066. Edgar is said to have died shortly after 1126, when William of Malmesbury wrote that he "now grows old in the country in privacy and quiet". However, two pipe rolls exist from the years 1158 and 1167 which list Edgar. The historian Edward Augustus Freeman stated that this referred either to Edgar (aged at least 115), to a son of his, or to another person who bore the title Ætheling.

=== Greece ===
A book Macrobii ("Long-Livers") is a work devoted to longevity. It was attributed to the ancient Greek author Lucian, although it is now accepted that he could not have written it. Most examples given in it are lifespans of 80 to 100 years, but some are much longer:

- Tiresias, the blind seer of Thebes, over 600 years.
- Nestor, over 300 years.
- Members of the "Seres" (a Chinese people), over 300 years.

According to one tradition, Epimenides of Crete (7th, 6th centuries BC) lived nearly 300 years.

=== Japan ===
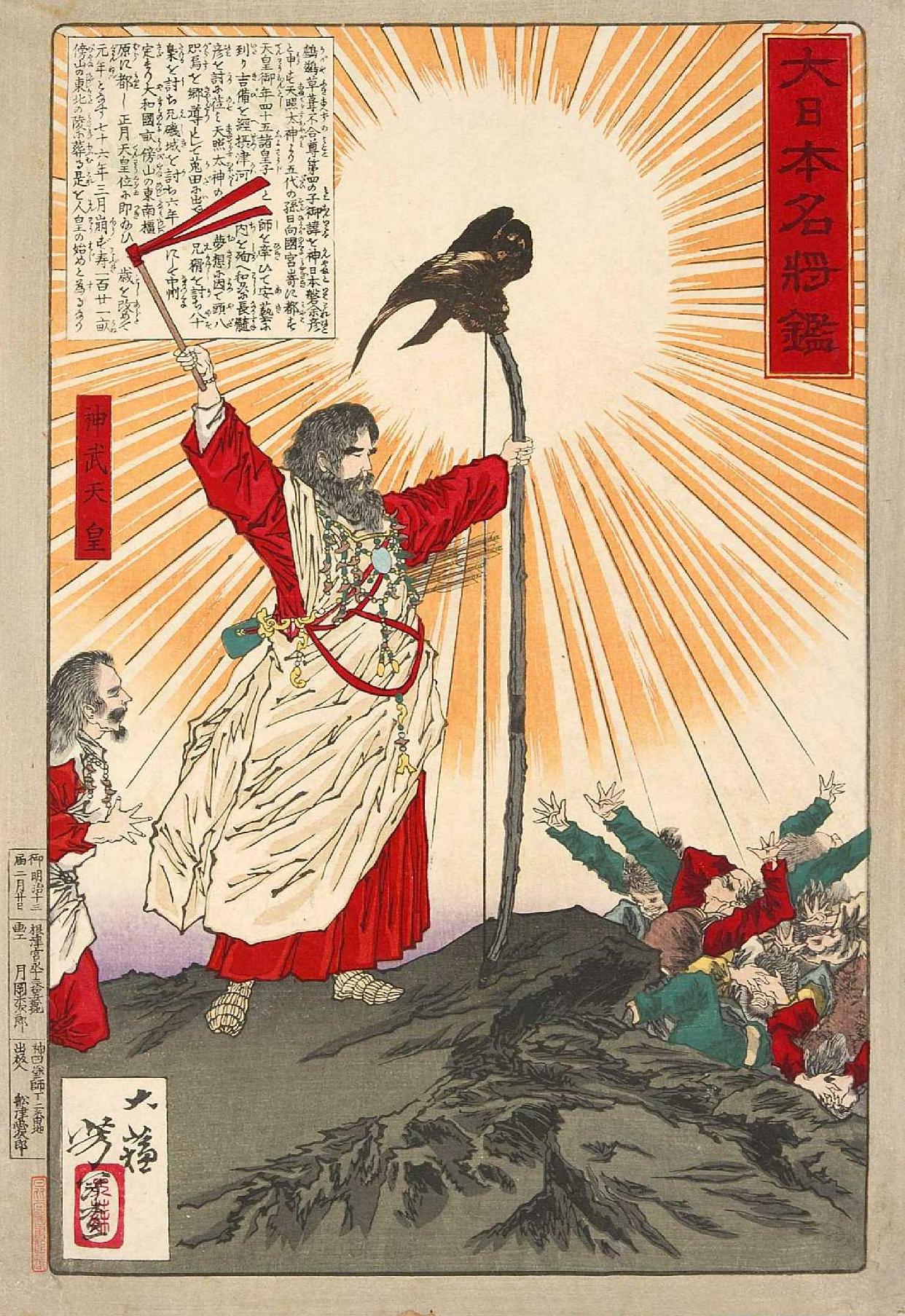
A woodblock print of Emperor Jimmu, part of Famous Generals of Japan by Tsukioka Yoshitoshi

Some early emperors of Japan are said to have ruled for more than a century, according to the tradition documented in the Kojiki, viz., Emperor Jimmu and Emperor Kōan.

- Emperor Jimmu (traditionally, 13 February 711 BC – 11 March 585 BC) lived 126 years according to the Kojiki. These dates correspond to 125 years, 339 days, on the proleptic Julian and Gregorian calendars.
- Emperor Kōan, according to Nihon Shoki, lived 137 years (from 427 BC to 291 BC).

=== Korea ===
- Dangun, the first ruler of Korea, is said to have been born in 2333 BCE and to have died in 425 BCE at the age of 1,908 years.
- Taejo of Goguryeo (46/47 – 165) is claimed to have reigned in Korea for 93 years beginning at age 7. After his retirement, the Samguk Sagi and Samguk Yusa give his age at death as 117–118, while the Book of the Later Han states he died in 121 at age 73–74.

=== Persian empire ===
The reigns of several shahs in the Shahnameh, an epic poem by Ferdowsi, are given as longer than a century:

- Zahhak, 1,000 years.
- Jamshid, 700 years.
- Fereydun, 500 years.
- Askani, 200 years.
- Kay Kāvus, 150 years.
- Manuchehr, 120 years.
- Lohrasp, 120 years.
- Goshtasp, 120 years.

=== Poland ===
- Piast Kołodziej, King of Poland, died in 861 at the alleged age of 120 (740 AD/861 AD).

=== Ancient Rome ===
In Roman times, Pliny wrote about longevity records from the census carried out in 74 AD under Vespasian. In one region of Italy, many people allegedly lived past 100; four were said to be 130, others up to 140.

=== Sumer ===
Age claims for the earliest eight Sumerian kings in the major recension of the Sumerian King List were in units and fractions of shar (3,600 years) and totaled 67 shar or 241,200 years.

In the only ten-king tablet recension of this list three kings (Alalngar, [...], kidunnu, and En-men-dur-ana) are recorded as having reigned 72,000 years together. The major recension assigns 43,200 years to the reign of En-men-lu-ana, and 36,000 years each to those of Alalngar and Dumuzid.

=== Vietnam ===
- Kinh Dương Vương, the first King of Vietnam, is said to be born in 2919 BC and died in 2792 BC (aged about 127 years).
- Lạc Long Quân reigned from 2793 BC to 2524 BC (about 269 years).

=== Wales ===
- Welsh bard Llywarch Hen (Heroic Elegies) died c. 500 in the parish of Llanvor, traditionally about age 150.

== Modern extreme longevity claims ==
This list includes claims of longevity of 130 and older from the 15th century onward. All birth year and age claims are merely alleged unless stated otherwise.

Name	Birth	Death	Age	Country	Summary
Sankardev	1449-10	1568	118	Baro-Bhuyans	Assamese polymath
Katherine FitzGerald	c. 1464	1604	c. 140	Lordship of Ireland; Kingdom of Ireland	"Old Countess of Desmond", famed for her extreme longevity, traditionally believed to have lived 120 or 140 years but now thought to have lived closer to 100
Thomas Parr	1482 or 1483	1635-11-13	152	England	The case was recorded in Philosophical Transactions of the Royal Society. William Harvey carried out a postmortem on him, according to Easton. Parr is buried in Westminster Abbey with his alleged age on the gravestone. It is possible that Parr's birth records were confused with those of his grandfather and Parr did not claim to remember events from the 15th century.
Henry Jenkins	1501	1670	169	England	A brief biography of Henry Jenkins, of Ellerton-on-Swale, Yorkshire, was written by Anne Saville in 1663 based on Jenkins's description, stating birth in 1501; he also claimed to recall the 1513 Battle of Flodden Field. However, Jenkins also testified in 1667, in favor of Charles Anthony in a court case against Calvert Smythson, that he was then only 157 or thereabouts. He was born in Bolton-on-Swale, and the date given, 17 May 1500, results in only a 1-year discrepancy with the age of 169 on his monument (he died 8 December 1670).
Peter Czartan	1539	1724	184	Romania	Charles Hulbert, who reported Czartan's case in an 1825 collection, added that John (172) and his wife Sara (164) both died in Hungary in 1741 after 148 years of marriage. The Book Validation of Exceptional Longevity has the old couples last name as Rowin, while The Virgin Birth and the Incarnation puts John and Sara's married name as Rovin.
Mrs Eckleston	1548	1691	143	Lordship of Ireland; Kingdom of Ireland	Of Philipstown, King's County (now Daingean, County Offaly). Sometimes mistakenly referenced as Mr Eckleston.
Henry Francisco	1686-06-11	1820-10-25	134	United States	Henry Francisco claimed that he was born in France in 1686. His death was recorded in Whitehall, Washington County, New York, in October 1820. A family bible shows his life dates as June 11, 1686 to October 10, 1820. His family were Huguenots who left France for the Netherlands and went from there to England, where Henry recalled being a drummer boy at the 1702 coronation of Queen Anne. He had military service in Queen Anne's wars before emigrating to America in the early 1700s. He married his first wife in New Jersey by 1727 and had at least five children with her. He married for a second time in 1766 at Whitehall, New York. The youngest of his claimed 21 children was born in 1782. He said that he had served in the French and Indian War in 1755. In January 1777, at age 90, he enlisted to serve in the Continental Army as a private in the company of Capt. Jeremiah Burroughs, and he served until April 1778. In 1819 he was awarded a pension for American Revolutionary War service. During his final years, skepticism was expressed about his claimed age, but older residents of the Whitehall area said they remembered "Old Henry" as having been an elderly man during their youth. In 1819, Benjamin Silliman of Yale visited him and came away as a believer in the claim of his exceptional longevity. Silliman described his visit and his conclusions in an 1824 book, Remarks on a Short Tour Between Hartford and Quebec in the Autumn of 1819.
Li Ching-Yuen	1736 - claimed; 1677 - disputed	1933-05-05	196–197; 255–256	Qing Empire; Republic of China	A New York Times story announced the death on 5 May 1933 in Kai County, Sichuan, at the age of 197, of Li Qingyun (李青云), who claimed to be born in 1736. A Time article noted that "respectful Chinese preferred to think" Li was 150 in 1827 (birth 1677), based on a government congratulatory message, and died at age 256. Tai chi master Da Liu stated that Li learned qigong from a hermit over age 500.
Zaro Aga	1764-02-16	1934-06-29	170	Ottoman Empire	Kurdish man who claimed birth on February 16, 1764, and died on June 29, 1934, in Istanbul, Turkey at the alleged age of 170.
Javier Pereira	1789	1955–58	165–169	Colombia	A Zenú Indian from Colombia who was reputedly over 160 years old at the time of his death. Although his death is variously said to have been in 1955, 1956, and 1958, sources all claim that he was born in 1789.
Maftei Pop	1804-06-12	1952-03-15	147	Romania	A man from Transylvania, who was claimed to be 148 years old when he died in 1952. The mayor of Recea Cristur in Cluj, Rus Laurian Alexandru, confirms that there are documents attesting that this man lived 148 years.
Shirali Muslimov	1805-03-26	1973-09-02	168	Russian Empire; Soviet Union; Azerbaijan	An Azerbaijani shepherd of Talysh ethnicity from the village of Barzavu in the Lerik region of Azerbaijan, a mountainous area near the Iranian border. He claimed to be the oldest person who ever lived when he died on September 2, 1973, at the alleged age of 168 years and 162 days, based solely on a passport. National Geographic carried the claim. Some sources claimed him to be the oldest centenarian in the USSR. It was reported that at the moment of Muslimov's death, his wife was still living at 120 years of age.
Mahmud Eyvazov	1808	1960	152	Russian Empire; Soviet Union; Azerbaijan	
Sylvester Magee	1841-05-29	1971-10-15	130	United States	Although much documentation is lost or possibly never existed, some sources suggest that Magee may have served in both the Confederate and Union armies. Alfred P. Andrews, founder of the Jackson Civil War Round Table and its president elect for 1965-66, helped Magee be classified as a Civil War veteran although no service records for him could be found.
Charlie Smith	1842	1979-10-05	137	United States	Prior to Smith's death, the Guinness Book of World Records had called his claim into question, noting that Smith's marriage certificate from 1910 stated that he was 35 years old at the time, which would make him 104 years old at the time of his death.
Konstantin Khrutsky	1855	1969-02-14	114	Russian Empire; Soviet Union	Belarusian military impostor who posed as a veteran of the 1877-1878 Russo-Turkish War. In 1955 he publicly claimed to be turning 100 and was subsequently honoured and decorated in Bulgaria; his story was not seriously challenged during his lifetime as fitting the Soviet-Bulgarian friendship narrative. He died after another 14 years, which would have made him a supercentenarian. Claimed ages such as 139 for a great-grandfather, 123 for a grandfather, 112 for his father, and 105 for an older brother. After his death, a similar centenarian claim was promoted about his younger brother. Later research has convincingly shown that Khrutsky was born in 1879, after the Russo–Turkish War, served as a minor church clerk in Belarus before 1914 but never in army, and lived only to 89; his relatives, including his brothers, were not centenarians either.
Bir Narayan Chaudhary	1856	1998	141–142	Nepal	Bir claimed he was born in 1856, the son of a landowner. A cattle rancher in the village of Khanar, near Biratnagar, he was purportedly a leader of the first land survey team in the area, conducted in 1888. He was a smoker throughout his later life. Bir rose to prominence in the mid-1990s when Nepalese television and press began reporting on his claimed age. In 1997, he was honored by Nepal's King Birendra for his claimed longevity.
Habib Miyan	1869-05-20	2008-08-19	139	India	Rahim "Habib Miyan" Khan of Jaipur, Rajasthan, India, holds the Guinness World record for the longest retirement pension. Miyan's claimed birth date derives from a family tree listing a Rahim Khan born in 1869, although his pension book listed his birth date as May 20, 1878. He said he had been using these documents since he was discharged from the army in 1938 to claim a pension, making him the world's longest-registered old-age pensioner. The Limca Book of Records lists him as the oldest man of Jaipur, describing him in its 2005 edition as "over 120 years". In 2004 two unidentified people donated money for Miyan to go on Hajj, making him purportedly the oldest Hajj pilgrim in history. He was named as the Aab-e-Jaipur ('Lustre of Jaipur') by the mayor of Jaipur.
Mbah Gotho	1870-12-31	2017-04-30	146	Dutch East Indies; Indonesia	In May 2010, Solopos reported that census enumerators recorded that Saparman Sodimejo, known more commonly as Mbah Gotho, was 142 years old. Liputan 6 reported that his estimated age was 140, and that he could not remember his date of birth but claimed to remember the construction of a sugar factory in Sragen in 1880. His ID card, issued in 2014, displays his claimed birth date of 31 December 1870. A heavy smoker throughout his life, he allegedly outlived ten siblings, four wives, and all five of his children. On 28 April 2017, he was admitted to Dr. Soehadi Prijonegoro Regional General Hospital, Sragen, where he died on 30 April.
Mubarak Rahmani Messe	1874	2014	140	Algeria	Died in 2014, allegedly at 140 years of age, in El Oued Province, Algeria, and was survived by 100 grandsons. According to family members, Rahmani had spent much of his early life in the Algerian Desert and later held various challenging occupations, including in construction, farming, and herding. He was hospitalised for the first time in 2012, with a stomach complaint. His diet, referred to as "natural", consisted largely of dates, wheat flour, sheep's milk, and green tea.
Tuti Yusupova	1880-07-01	2015-03-28	134	Russian Empire; Soviet Union; Uzbekistan	Reuters reported that her age was uncovered in 2009 by Safar Hakimov, the ruling Uzbekistan Liberal Democratic Party's local chairman in Tortkol, Karakalpakstan when researching centenarians as part of the plans for the country's independence anniversary. After her funeral, her birth certificate and passport were declared conclusive evidence by Baxadir Yangibayev, Chairman of the Council of Ministers in the Republic of Karakalpakstan, where she lived and died.
Alimihan Seyiti	1886-06-25	2021-12-16	135	China	Died in 2021. Claimed to be 135 years old.
Maria Lucimar Pereira	1890-09-03	2022-05-21	131	Brazil	A member of the Kaxinawa tribe, an indigenous people of Brazil and Peru. Indigenous name: Parã Banu Bake Huni Kui. Staff for Brazil's National Institute of Social Security found that Pereira had a birth certificate stating her year of birth as 1890. However, this certificate was only approved in 1985, late in her life. Exaggerated longevity claims may be common in Pereira's village, as four out of the 80 inhabitants in the village are over 90 years old.
Huvaydo Umarova	1895-01-01	-	130	Uzbekistan	In September 2025, a district court in Uzbekistan accepted a petition by the country's Ministry of Justice stating Umarova's date of birth as January 1, 1895. However, the ages of Umarova's surviving children would place her age at childbirth at between 54 and 74; the latter would also make her the oldest documented mother in history. Umarova also claims to have had an aunt and uncle who lived to the ages of 125 and 130, respectively.

=== Miscellaneous ===
- Cases of extreme longevity in the British Isles were listed by John Lowthrop in 1722, by James Easton in 1799, who covered 1,712 cases documented between 66 BC and the year of publication, and by Charles Hulbert in 1825.
- Swedish death registers contain detailed information on thousands of centenarians going back to 1749; the maximum age at death reported between 1751 and 1800 was 147.
- Albrecht von Haller (d. 1777) allegedly collected examples of 62 people ages 110–120, 29 ages 120–130, and 15 ages 130–140.
- An early 1812 Peterburgskaya Gazeta reports a man between ages 200 and 225 in the diocese of Yekaterinoslav (now Dnipro, Ukraine).
- Deaths officially reported in the Russian Empire in 1815 listed 1,068 centenarians, including 246 supercentenarians (50 at age 120–155 and one even older). Time magazine considered that, by the Soviet Union, longevity had elevated to a state-supported "Methuselah cult". The USSR insisted on its citizens' unrivaled longevity by claiming 592 people (224 male, 368 female) over age 120 in a 15 January 1959 census and 100 citizens of the Russian SSR alone aged 120 to 156 in March 1960. According to the opinion of Time magazine, in Georgia such claims were fostered by Georgian-born Joseph Stalin's apparent hope that such longevity might rub off on him. Zhores A. Medvedev, who demonstrated that all 500-plus claims failed birth-record validation and other tests, said that Stalin "liked the idea that [other] Georgians lived to be 100".
- A periodical The Aesculapian Register, written by physicians and published in Philadelphia in 1824, listed a number of cases, including several purported to have lived over 130. The authors said the list was taken from the Dublin Magazine.
- A 1973 National Geographic article on longevity reported, as a very aged people, the Burusho–Hunza people in the Hunza Valley of the mountains of Pakistan.
- In 2026 in Kraków, Poland one apartment house had to be regained by allegedly living 162-year old man.

== Practices ==
=== Diets ===
According to a 2021 review, there is no clinical evidence that any dietary practice contributes to longevity.

=== Alchemy ===
Traditions that have been believed to confer greater human longevity include alchemy.

- Nicolas Flamel (early 1330s – c. 1418) was a 14th-century scrivener who developed a reputation as alchemist and creator of an "elixir of life" that conferred immortality upon himself and his wife Perenelle. His arcanely inscribed tombstone is preserved at the Musée de Cluny in Paris.
- Fridericus (Ludovicus) Gualdus (Federico Gualdi), author of "Revelation of the True Chemical Wisdom", lived in Venice in the 1680s. His age was reported in a letter in a contemporary Dutch newspaper to be over 400. By some accounts, when asked about a portrait he carried, he said it was of himself, painted by Titian (who died in 1576), but gave no explanation and left Venice the following morning. By another account, Gualdus left Venice due to religious accusations and died in 1724. The "Compass der Weisen" alludes to him as still alive in 1782 and nearly 600 years old.

=== Fountain of Youth ===
The Fountain of Youth is a mythical spring that supposedly restores the youth of anyone who drinks or bathes in its waters. Tales of such a fountain have been recounted around the world for thousands of years, appearing in the writings of Herodotus (5th century BCE), in the Alexander Romance (3rd century CE), and in the stories of Prester John (early Crusades, 11th/12th centuries CE).

Stories of similar waters also featured prominently among the people of the Caribbean during the Age of Exploration (early 16th century); they spoke of the restorative powers of the water in the mythical land of Bimini. Based on these many legends, explorers and adventurers looked for the elusive Fountain of Youth or some other remedy to aging, generally associated with magic waters. These waters might have been a river, a spring or any other water-source said to reverse the aging process and to cure sickness when swallowed or bathed in.

The legend became particularly prominent in the 16th century, when it became associated with the Spanish explorer Juan Ponce de León, the first Governor of Puerto Rico. Ponce de León was supposedly searching for the Fountain of Youth when he traveled to Florida in 1513. Legend has it that Native Americans told Ponce de León that the Fountain of Youth was in Bimini.

== See also ==
- Ageing
- Ambrosia
- Amrita
- Battery theory
- Cup of Jamshid
- Genetics
- Holy Grail
- Iðunn
- List of longest-reigning monarchs
- List of oldest living people
- List of the verified oldest people
- Magu (deity)
- Oldest people
- Peaches of Immortality
- Pill of Immortality
- Research into centenarians
- Supercentenarian

== Bibliography ==
- Boia, Lucian (2004). Forever Young: A Cultural History of Longevity from Antiquity to the Present. Reaktion Books. ISBN 978-1-86189-154-9.
- Gnuse, Robert (2014), Misunderstood Stories: Theological Commentary on Genesis 1-11, Eugene, Oregon: Cascade Books, ISBN 978-1-62564-007-9
- Thoms, William J. (1879). The Longevity of Man. Its Facts and Its Fictions. With a prefatory letter to Prof. Owen, C.B., F.R.S. on the limits and frequency of exceptional cases. London: F. Norgate.
