= Bir Narayan Chaudhary =

Nepalian supercentenarian, claimed oldest person ever

- वीर नारायण चौधरी
- Born: 1856 (claimed); Nepal
- Died: 20 April 1998 (claimed); Khanar, Nepal
- Occupation: Cattle rancher
- Known for: Claims of extreme longevity

Bir Narayan Majhi Chaudhari (Nepali: वीर नारायण चौधरी; 1856? – 20 April 1998) was a Nepali man who claimed to be the oldest person ever. He died at the self-professed age of 141. Bir was unable to substantiate his longevity claims with documentation, and since he did not have a birth certificate The Guinness Book of Records did not identify him as the oldest person in the world.

According to Bir he was born in 1856, the son of a landowner. A cattle rancher in the village of Khanar, near Kathmandu, Chaudhari was purportedly a leader of the first land survey team in the area, conducted in 1888. A smoker throughout his later life, Chaudhari rose to prominence in the mid-1990s when Nepalese television and press began reporting on his claimed advanced age. In 1997, he was honored by Nepal's king Birendra.

Chaudhari had a son and a daughter with his first wife, both of whom predeceased him, and a daughter with his second wife. At the time of his death, in 1998, he had four grandchildren, 15 great-grandchildren and four great-great-grandchildren.

== See also ==
- Longevity myths
