= Proleptic =

Proleptic may refer to:

- Prolepsis (disambiguation), several meanings related to foreshadowing
- Proleptic calendar (disambiguation), a calendar that is applied to dates before its introduction
- Proleptic syllogism, a class of syllogism in logic
