= Kashgar Prefecture =

Prefecture of Xinjiang, China

Coordinates: 39.47°N 75.99°E

Kashgar Prefecture: قەشقەر ۋىلايىتى (Uyghur); 喀什地区 (Chinese); Kashi Prefecture
- Prefecture
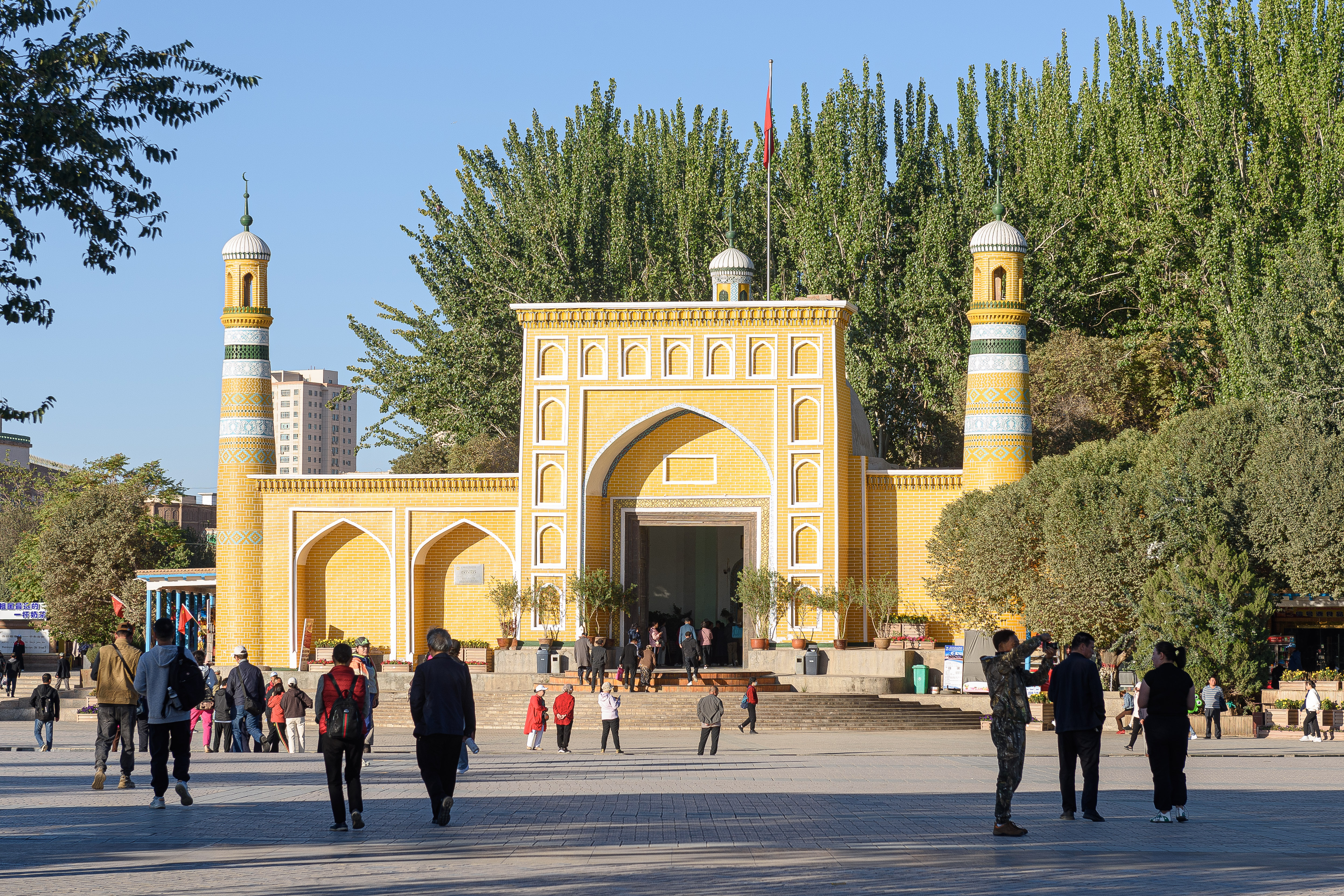
- Id Kah Mosque

- Kashgar Prefecture (red) in Xinjiang (orange)
- Country: People's Republic of China
- Province: Xinjiang
- Prefecture seat: Kashgar
- County-level divisions: 1 county-level city, 11 counties

Area
  - Prefecture: 112,057 km^{2} (43,265 sq mi)
  - Urban: 555 km^{2} (214 sq mi)
  - Metro: 555 km^{2} (214 sq mi)

Population (2020 census)
  - Prefecture: 4,496,400
  - Density: 40.126/km^{2} (103.93/sq mi)
  - Urban: 400,225
  - Urban density: 721/km^{2} (1,870/sq mi)
  - Metro: 400,225

Ethnic groups
  - Major ethnic groups: Uyghur, Han Chinese

GDP (nominal) (2025)
  - Prefecture: CN¥ 175.2 billion US$ 24.5 billion
  - Per capita: CN¥ 37,844; US$ 5,298
- Time zone: UTC+8 (China Standard)
- Postal code: 844000
- ISO 3166 code: CN-XJ-31
- License Plate: 新Q
- Website: Kashgar Prefecture Government

Kashgar Prefecture

Uyghur name
- Uyghur: قەشقەر ۋىلايىتى
Transcriptions
- Latin Yëziqi: Qeshqer Wilayiti
- Yengi Yeziⱪ: Ⱪəxⱪər Vilayiti
- SASM/GNC: K̂äxk̂är Vilayiti
- Siril Yëziqi: Қәшқәр Вилайити

Chinese name
- Simplified Chinese: 喀什地区
- Traditional Chinese: 喀什地區
- Hanyu Pinyin: Kāshí Dìqū
Transcriptions
Standard Mandarin
- Hanyu Pinyin: Kāshí Dìqū
- Bopomofo: ㄎㄚ ㄕˊ ㄉㄧˋ ㄑㄩ
- Gwoyeu Romatzyh: Kashyr Dihchiu
- Wade–Giles: Kʻa^{1}-shih^{2} Ti^{4}-chʻü^{1}
- Tongyong Pinyin: Kashíh Dìcyu
- Yale Romanization: Kāshŕ Dìchyū
- MPS2: Kāshŕ Dìchiū
- IPA: [kʰá.ʂɻ̩̌ tî.tɕʰý]

Alternative Chinese name
- Simplified Chinese: 喀什噶尔地区
- Traditional Chinese: 喀什噶爾地區
- Hanyu Pinyin: PRC Standard Mandarin: Kāshígá'ěr Dìqū; ROC Standard Mandarin: Kàshígé'ěr Dìqū
Transcriptions
Standard Mandarin
- Hanyu Pinyin: PRC Standard Mandarin: Kāshígá'ěr Dìqū; ROC Standard Mandarin: Kàshígé'ěr Dìqū
- Bopomofo: PRC: ㄎㄚ ㄕˊ ㄍㄚˊ ㄦˇ ㄉㄧˋ ㄑㄩ; ROC: ㄎㄚˋ ㄕˊ ㄍㄜˊ ㄦˇ ㄉㄧˋ ㄑㄩ
- Gwoyeu Romatzyh: PRC: Kashyrgar'eel Dihchiu; ROC: Kahshyrger'eel Dihchiu
- Wade–Giles: PRC: Kʻa^{1}-shih^{2}-ka^{2}-êrh^{3} Ti^{4}-chʻü^{1} ROC: Kʻa^{4}-shih^{2}-ko^{2}-êrh^{3} Ti^{4}-chʻü^{1}
- Tongyong Pinyin: PRC: Kashíhgá'ěr Dìcyu; ROC: Kàshíhgé'ěr Dìcyu
- Yale Romanization: PRC: Kāshŕgáěr Dìchyū; ROC: Kàshŕgéěr Dìchyū
- MPS2: PRC: Kāshŕgáěr Dìchiū; ROC: Kàshŕgéěr Dìchiū
- IPA: PRC: [kʰá.ʂɻ̩̌.kǎ.àɚ tî.tɕʰý] ROC: [kʰâ.ʂɻ̩̌.kɤ̌.àɚ tî.tɕʰý]

Kazakh name
- Kazakh: قاشقار ايماعى; Қашқар аймағы Qaşqar aimağy

Kyrgyz name
- Kyrgyz: قاشقار ايماعى; Кашкар аймагы Qaşqar ajmağy

Uzbek name
- Uzbek: قشقر ولايتى; Қашқар Вилояти Qashqar viloyati

Kashgar Prefecture, also known as Kashi Prefecture, is a prefecture in southwestern Xinjiang, China, in the Tarim Basin region (roughly the southern half of Xinjiang). It has an area of 112,057 km^{2} (43,265 sq mi) and 4,496,377 inhabitants at the 2020 census with a population density of 35.5 inhabitants/km^{2}. The capital of the prefecture is the city of Kashgar which has a population 506,640.

Kashgar Prefecture borders the Gorno-Badakhshan Autonomous Region of Tajikistan, Badakhshan Province of Afghanistan, Gilgit-Baltistan of Pakistan, and Ladakh of India in the far south.

== History ==
Kashgar, formerly referred to as Shule, served as the capital of the Shule Kingdom in the 2nd century B.C., inhabited by Indo-European tribes speaking Ancient Tocharian languages in the Tarim Basin. The earliest references to Shule emerged in the literature of the Han Dynasty. Shule served as the pivotal junction of the Silk Road in the northern Tarim Basin, facilitating access to the Dayuezhi, Dayuan, and Kangju in Central Asia, and acting as the nexus of east–west communication. Circa 177 B.C., Shule faced oppression by the advancing Dayuezhi and was compelled to ally with the formidable Xiongnu, becoming one of its 36 vassal states.

After the Communist takeover of Kuomintang, Kashgar Prefecture (喀什專區) and Yarkant Prefecture (莎車專區) were established.

In 1902, a magnitude 7.7 earthquake struck the prefecture. It caused extreme devastation, destroying 30,000 homes and killing as many as 10,000 people.

In 1942, Xinjiang restructured Shache, Zephyr, and Maigaiti counties, amalgamating them with Yecheng County in the Hotan district to establish the 10th administrative district of Xinjiang (Shache district), which encompasses Shache, Zephyr, Makgaiti, and Yecheng counties. In 1949, the Kashi subdistrict was established in Xinjiang, which was part of Xinjiang province.

In 1955, Barin, Jamaterek and Ujme, which were part of Yengisar County, became part of Akto County and Bulungkol was transferred to Akto County in Kizilsu from Tashkurgan County in today's Kashgar Prefecture. In June 1956, Yarkant Prefecture was dissolved and made part of Kashgar Prefecture. On January 11, 1971, Kashgar Prefecture was designated as Kashgar Region.

In January 1979, Kashgar zhuānqū Prefecture (喀什专区) became Kashgar dìqū Prefecture (喀什地区).

In August 1982, Kashgar Prefecture opened a frontier post to exchange goods with Pakistan. Kashgar was recognized as a National Famous Historical and Cultural City of China in 1986. In May 2010, the Central Xinjiang Work Conference formally sanctioned the creation of a Special Economic Zone (SEZ) in Kashgar, designating it as China's sixth SEZ, which benefits from preferential policies in industry, taxation, finance, land, and foreign commerce.

In February 2002, a 6.7 magnitude earthquake killed 267 people in Maralbexi County and Payzawat County.

== Geography ==
Most of the prefecture has a cold desert climate.

The second-highest peak on Earth, K2, is located on the China–Pakistan border in southern Kashgar Prefecture in an area claimed by India as part of the Trans-Karakoram Tract.

== Administrative divisions ==
#	Name	Uyghur (UEY)	Uyghur Latin (ULY)	Chinese (S)	Hanyu Pinyin	Population (2020 Census)	Area (km^{2})	Density (/km^{2})
1	Kashgar (Kashi)	قەشقەر شەھىرى	Qeshqer Shehiri	喀什市	Kāshí Shì	782,662	1,003	780.32
2	Shufu County	كونا شەھەر ناھىيىسى	Konasheher Nahiyisi	疏附县	Shūfù Xiàn	263,014	2,709	97.09
3	Shule County (Yengixahar County)	يېڭىشەھەر ناھىيىسى	Yéngisheher Nahiyisi	疏勒县	Shūlè Xiàn	355,544	2,159	164.68
4	Yengisar County	يېڭىسار ناھىيىسى	Yéngisar Nahiyisi	英吉沙县	Yīngjíshā Xiàn	276,641	3,425	80.77
5	Poskam County (Zepu County)	پوسكام ناھىيىسى	Poskam Nahiyisi	泽普县	Zépǔ Xiàn	214,543	988	217.15
6	Yarkant County (Shache County)	يەكەن ناھىيىسى	Yeken Nahiyisi	莎车县	Shāchē Xiàn	860,800	8,957	96,10
7	Kargilik County (Yecheng County)	قاغىلىق ناھىيىسى	Qaghiliq Nahiyisi	叶城县	Yèchéng Xiàn	525,436	28,559	18.40
8	Makit County	مەكىت ناھىيىسى	Mekit Nahiyisi	麦盖提县	Màigàití Xiàn	224,154	10,883	20.60
9	Yopurga County	يوپۇرغا ناھىيىسى	Yopurgha Nahiyisi	岳普湖县	Yuèpǔhú Xiàn	162,675	3,128	52.01
10	Payzawat County (Jiashi; Peyziwat)	پەيزاۋات ناھىيىسى	Peyzawat Nahiyisi	伽师县	Jiāshī Xiàn	424,821	6,528	65.08
11	Maralbexi County (Bachu County)	مارالبېشى ناھىيىسى	Maralbéshi Nahiyisi	巴楚县	Bāchǔ Xiàn	366,141	18,377	19.92
12	Cenling County	سېنلىڭ ناھىيىسى	Sénling Nahiyisi	岑岭县	Cénlǐng Xiàn			
13	Taxkorgan Tajik Autonomous County	تاشقورغان تاجىك ئاپتونوم ناھىيىسى	Tashqorghan Tajik Aptonom Nahiyisi	塔什库尔干塔吉克自治县	Tǎshíkù'ěrgān Tǎjíkè Zìzhìxiàn	39,946	24,682	1.62

== Demographics ==
As of the end of 2017, 4,295,200 of the 4,649,700 residents of the prefecture were Uyghur, 288,000 were Han Chinese and 66,500 were from other ethnic groups.

The population of Kashgar Prefecture was 4,499,158 according to the 2015 census. It has a population density of 35.5 inhabitants per km^{2}.

As of 2015, 4,140,255 of the 4,499,158 residents of the prefecture were Uyghur, 292,972 were Han Chinese and 65,931 were from other ethnic groups.

As of 1999, 89.37% of the population of Kashgar (Kasi) Prefecture was Uyghur and 9.1% of the population was Han Chinese.

In 1997, the population of Kashgar Prefecture was 3,145,000 with Uyghurs making up 89.4% of the total.

As of 1983–4, Kashgar Prefecture had 6,180 mosques. In the mid-1980's, there were two million Uyghurs in Kashgar Prefecture and 360,000 Han Chinese.

Population by ethnicity

Ethnicity	2000		2010		2015	
Ethnicity	Population	%	Population	%	Population	%
Uyghur	3,042,942	89.32%	3,606,779	90.60%	4,140,255	92.02%
Han	311,770	9.15%	318,281	8.00%	292,972	6.51%
Tajik (Pamiris)	33,611	0.99%	40,111	1.01%		
Kyrgyz	5,078	0.15%	5,528	0.14%		
Hui	5,046	0.15%	4,816	0.12%		
Uzbek	2,496	0.07%	2,050	0.05%		
Korean	1,078	0.03%	1,457	0.03%		
Tujia	829	0.02%	156	<0.01%		
Miao	649	0.02%				
Mongol	634	0.02%	234	<0.01%		
Tibetan	530	0.02%	158	<0.01%		
Zhuang	521	0.02%	234	<0.01%		
Kazakhs			306	0.01%		
Others	1,607	0.05%	638	0.02%	65,931	1.47%
Total	3,406,791	100%	3,980,778	100%	4,499,158	100%

== Economy ==
As of 2025, Kashgar Prefecture had a GDP of CN¥175.212 billion (US$24.530 billion) and a GDP per capita of CN¥37,844 (US$5,298). In early 2010, the National Development and Reform Commission released a Circular regarding the Progress of Western Development in 2009 and Work Arrangements for 2010, announcing the promotion of Dongxing in Guangxi, Ruili in Yunnan, the Kashgar region in Xinjiang, and Manzhouli in Inner Mongolia as Special Economic Zones (SEZs) along the borders in 2010. A conference regarding Xinjiang's developments was held in Beijing in May 2010, coinciding with the establishment of the Kashgar Special Economic Zone, which pioneered reforms in resource taxation and fees in Xinjiang. The region's per capita GDP attained the national average within five years.

== Historical maps ==
Historical English-language maps including modern-day Kashgar Prefecture area:

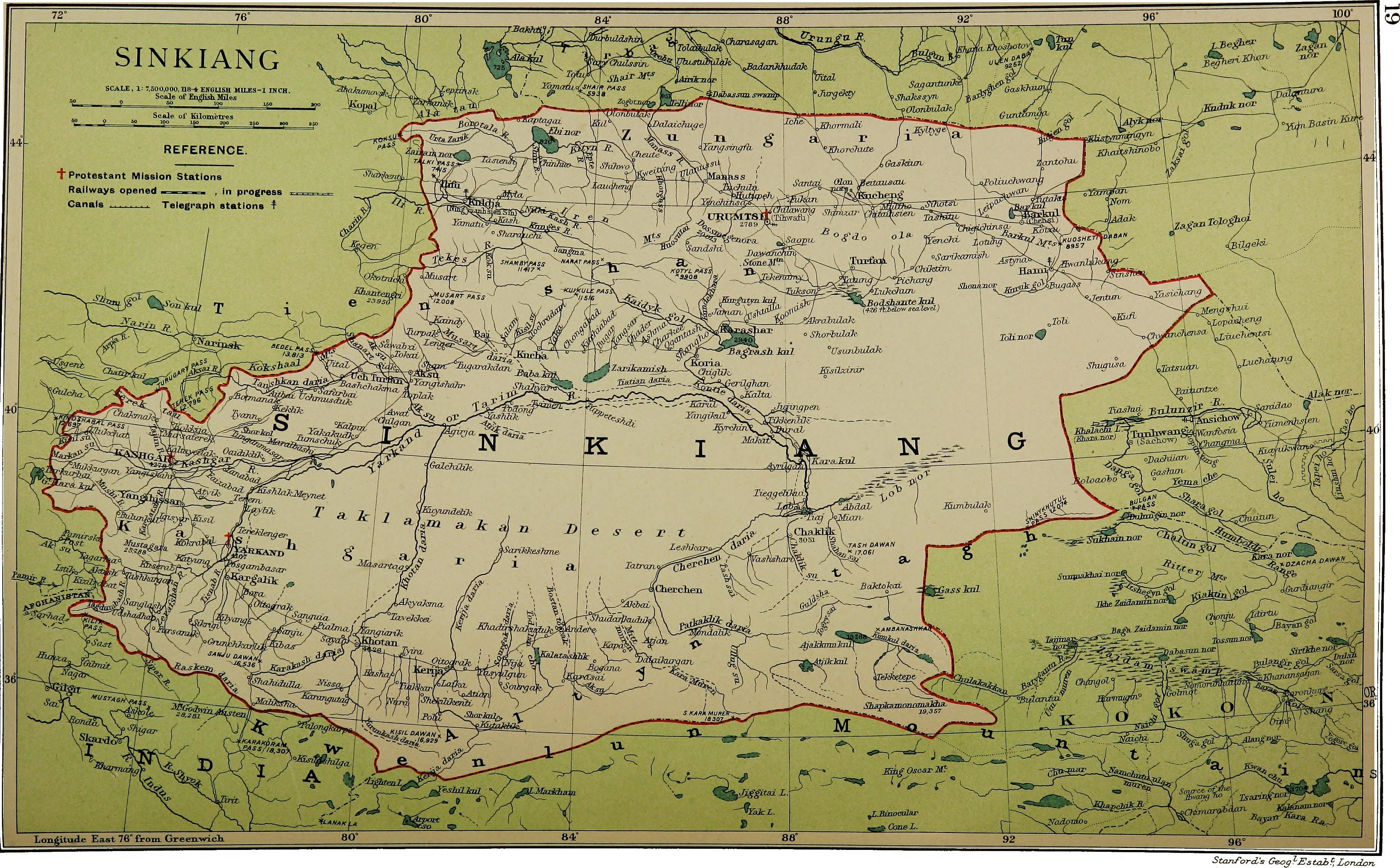
Map including Kashgar (1917)

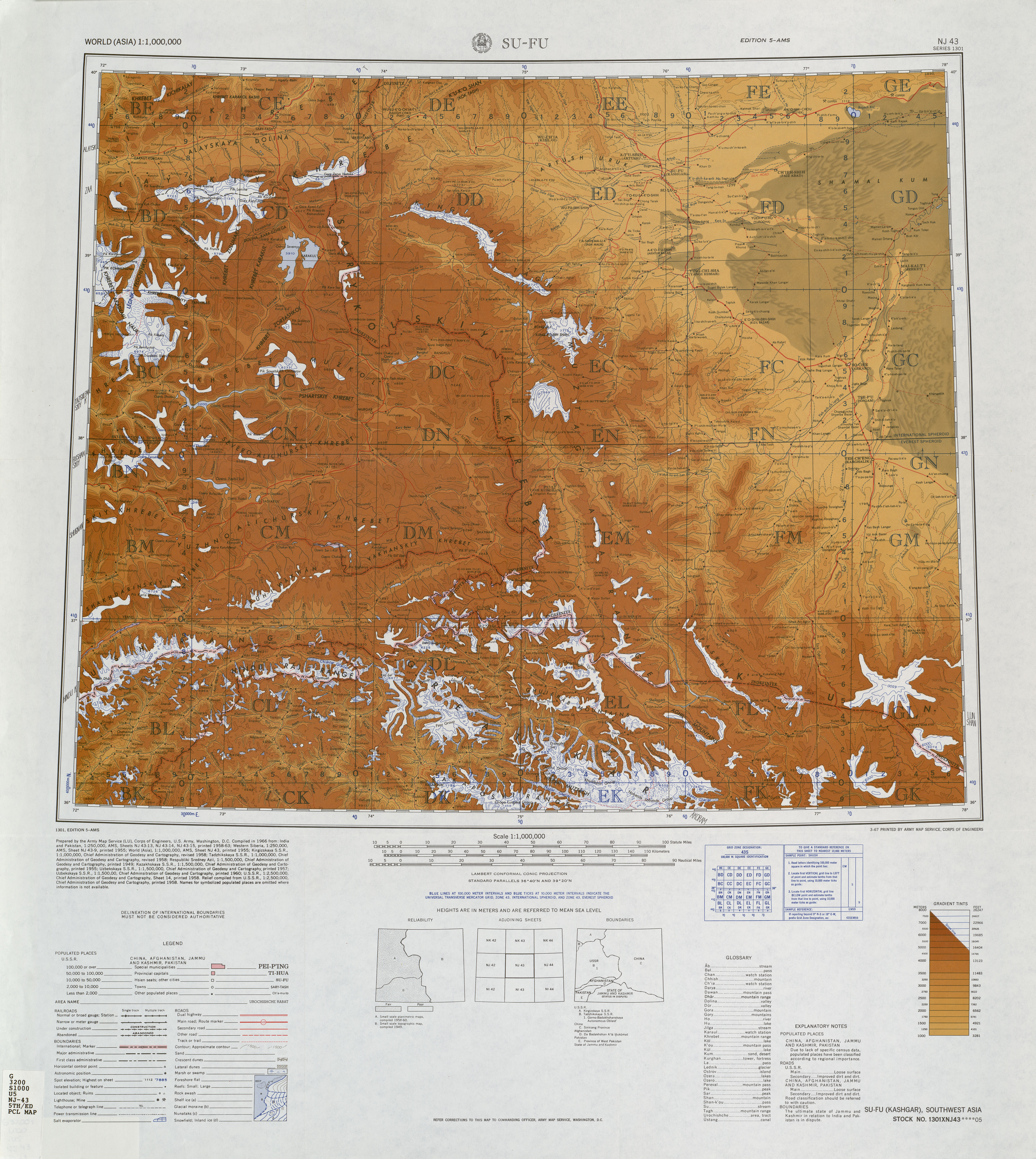
Map including Kashgar and surrounding region from the International Map of the World (AMS, 1966) (Note: From map: "DELINEATION OF INTERNATIONAL BOUNDARIES MUST NOT BE CONSIDERED AUTHORITATIVE")

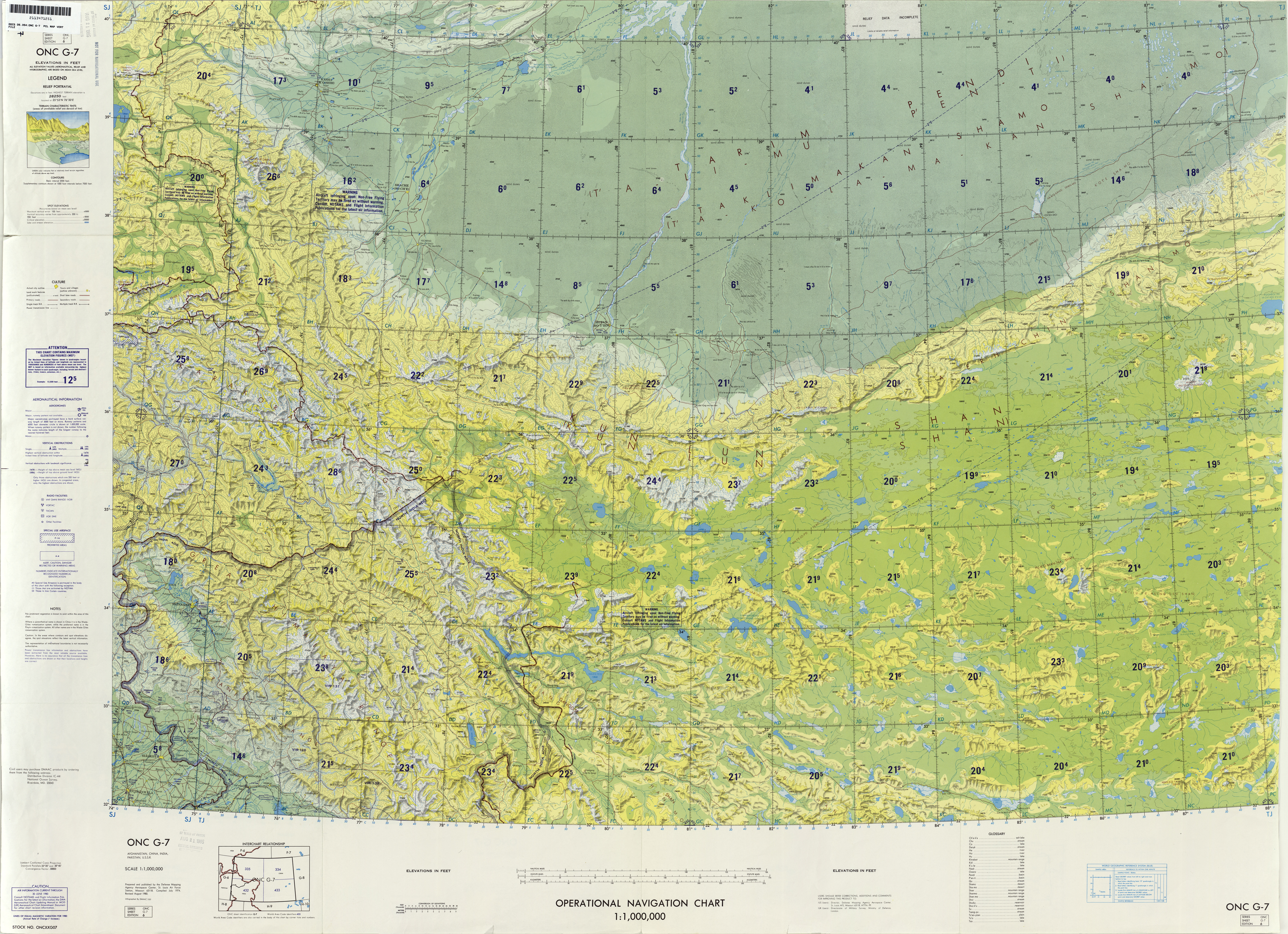
From the Operational Navigation Chart; map including Kashgar Prefecture area (DMA, 1980) (Note: From map: "The representation of international boundaries is not necessarily authoritative.")

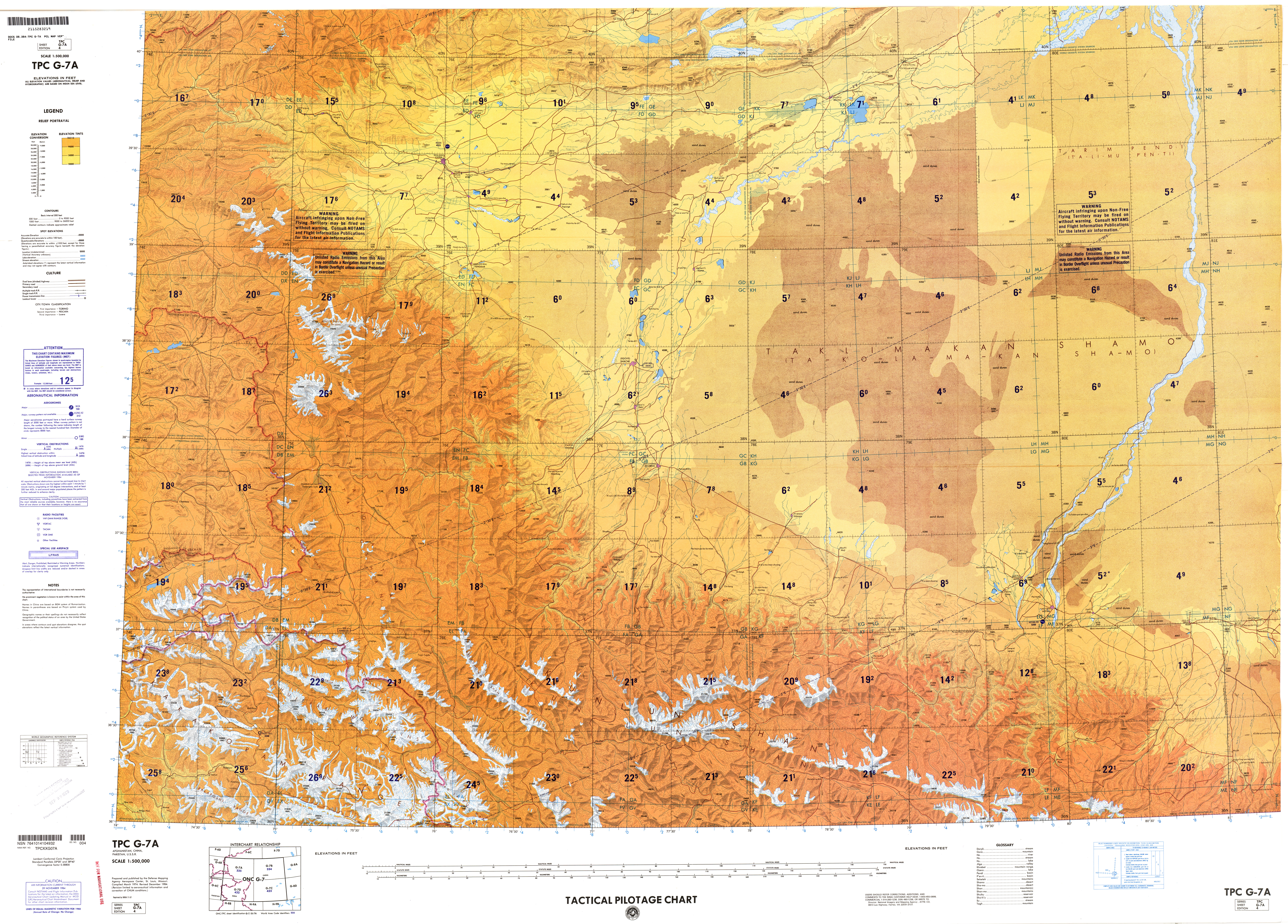
Map including Kashgar Prefecture area (northwest) (DMA, 1984) (Note: From map: "The representation of international boundaries is not necessarily authoritative")

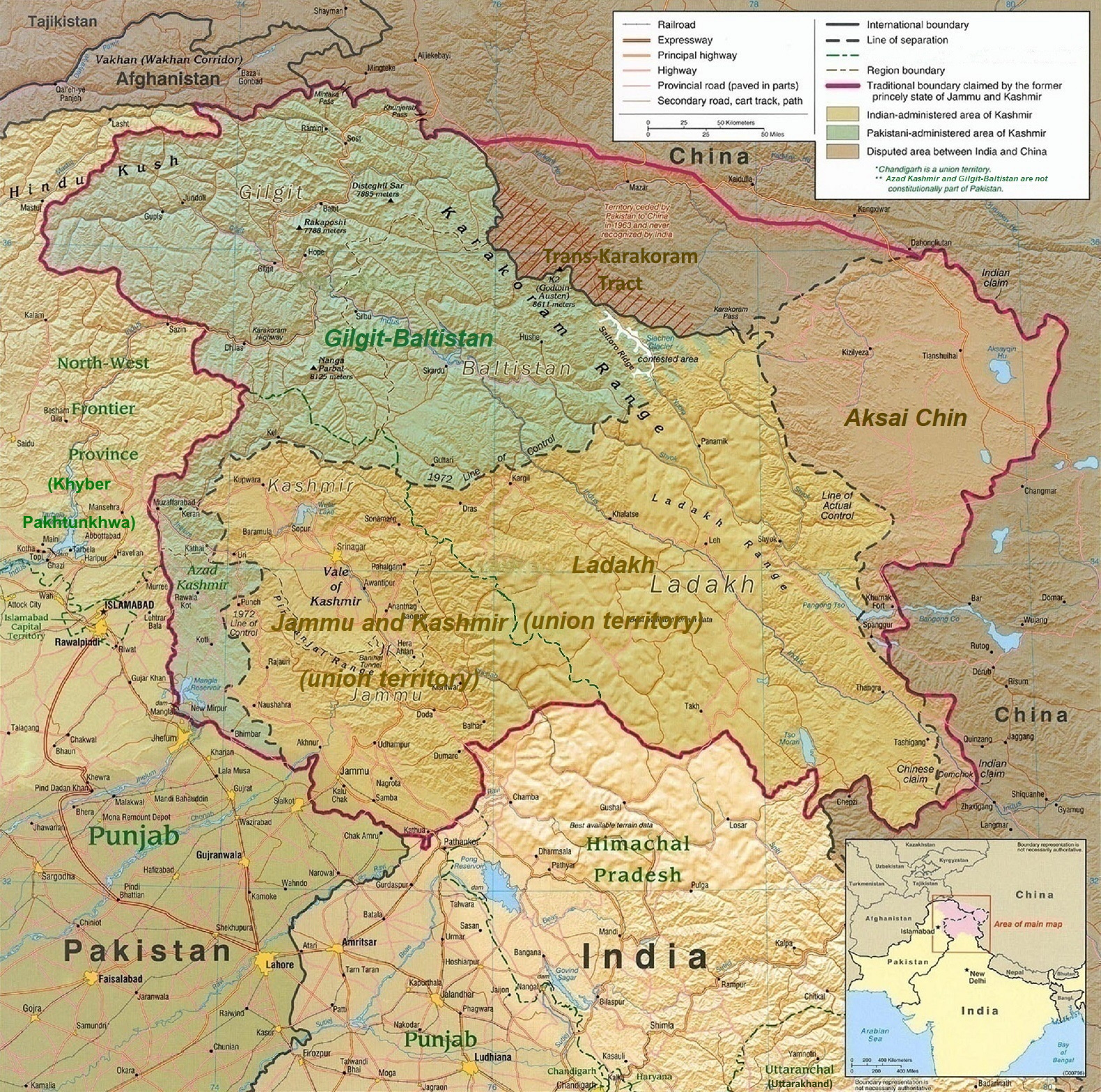
"Territory ceded by Pakistan to China in 1963 and never recognized by India" (Trans-Karakoram Tract in southern Kashgar Prefecture)

== See also ==
- First East Turkestan Republic
- Shaksgam River
- Tumxuk
