= Shule County =

Shule County: 疏勒县 (Chinese); يېڭىشەھەر ناھىيىسى (Uyghur); Yengisheher, Yengixahar
- County
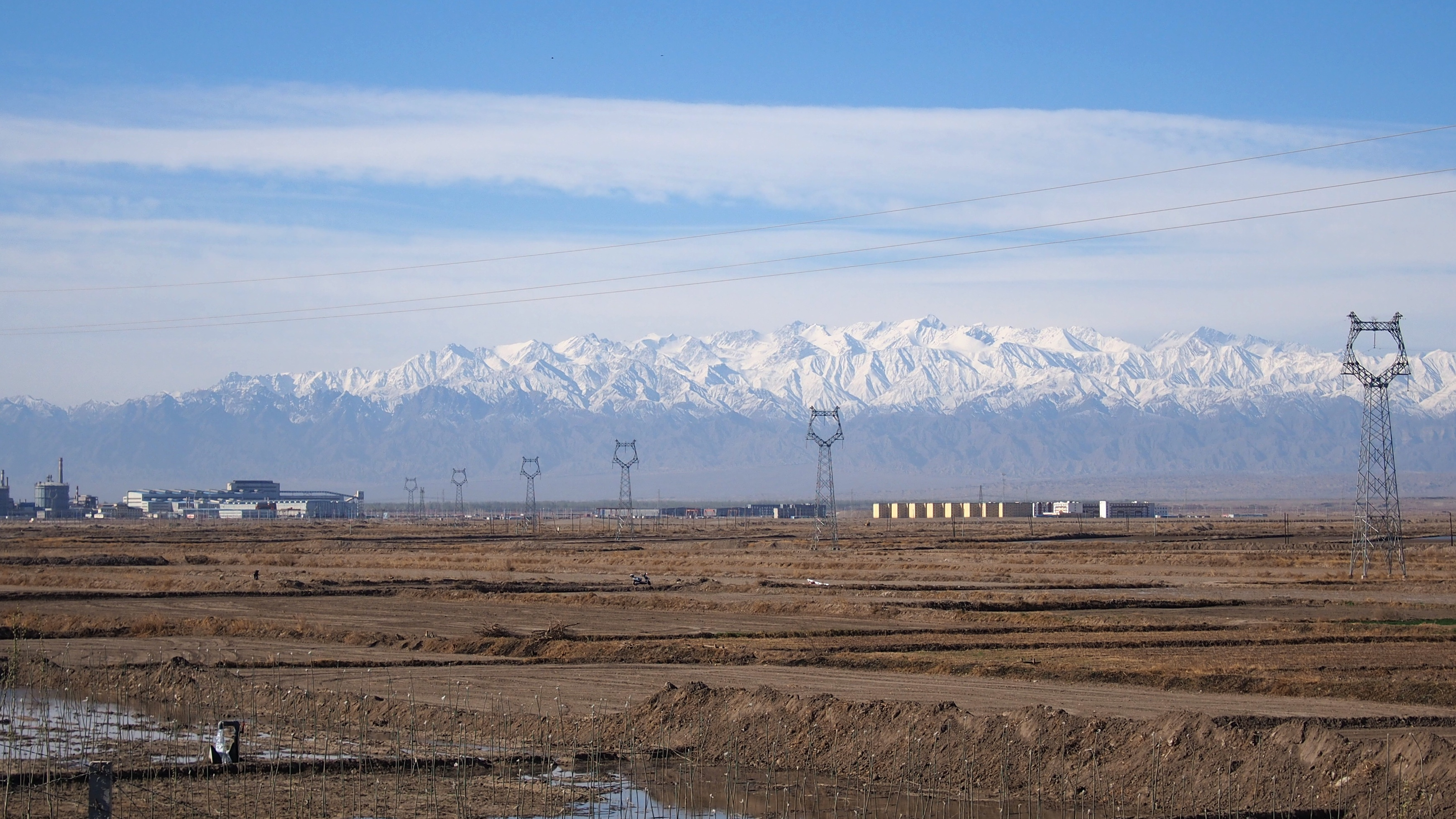

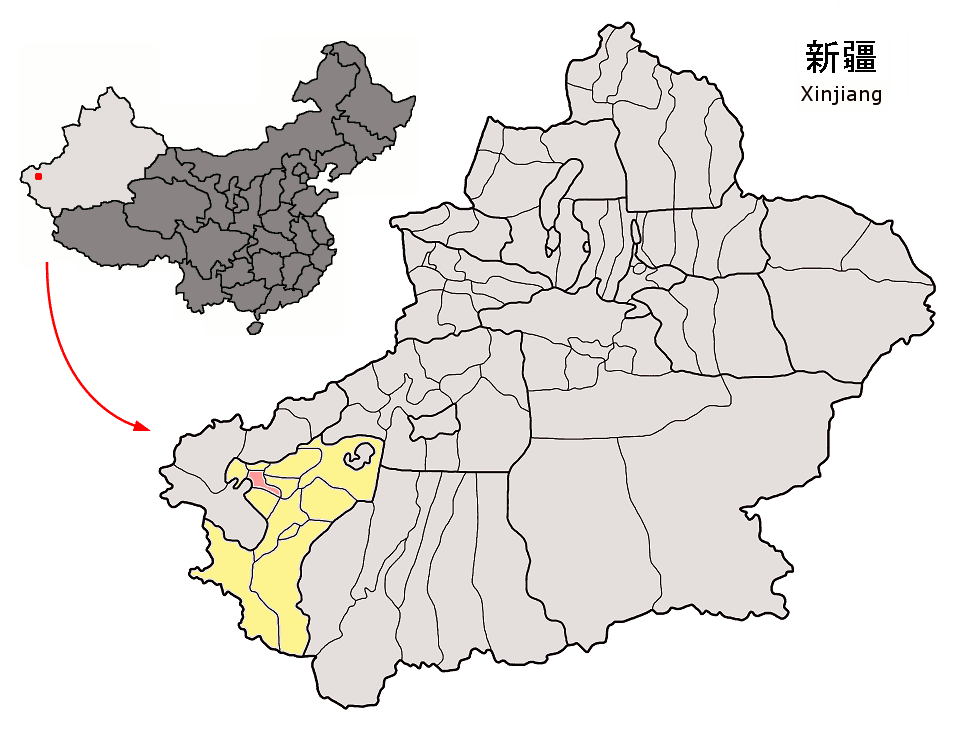
- Location of Shule County (red) within Kashgar Prefecture (yellow) and Xinjiang

- Location of the seat in Xinjiang Shule (Xinjiang) Shule (China)
- Coordinates: 39°23′29″N 76°02′24″E
- Country: China
- Autonomous region: Xinjiang
- Prefecture: Kashgar
- County seat: Yengisheher (Shule)

Area
  - Total: 2,394 km^{2} (924 sq mi)

Population (2020)
  - Total: 355,544
  - Density: 148.5/km^{2} (384.7/sq mi)

Ethnic groups
  - Major ethnic groups: Uyghur
- Time zone: UTC+8 (China Standard (Note: Locals in Xinjiang frequently observe UTC+6 (Xinjiang Time), 2 hours behind Beijing.))
- Postal code: 844200
- Website: shule.gov.cn (in Chinese)

Shule County

Chinese name
- Simplified Chinese: 疏勒县
- Traditional Chinese: 疏勒縣
Transcriptions
Standard Mandarin
- Hanyu Pinyin: Shūlè Xiàn
- Wade–Giles: Shu¹-lê⁴ Hsien⁴

Alternative Chinese name
- Simplified Chinese: 英纳协海尔县
- Traditional Chinese: 英納協海爾縣
Transcriptions
Standard Mandarin
- Hanyu Pinyin: Yīngnàxiéhǎi'ěr Xiàn

Second alternative Chinese name
- Simplified Chinese: 喀什噶尔英纳协海尔县
- Traditional Chinese: 喀什噶爾英納協海爾縣
Transcriptions
Standard Mandarin
- Hanyu Pinyin: Kāshígá'ěr Yīngnàxiéhǎi'ěr Xiàn

Uyghur name
- Uyghur: قەشقەر يېڭىشەھەر ناھىيىسى
- Literal meaning: Kashgar New City County
Transcriptions
- Latin Yëziqi: Qeshqer Yëngisheher Nahiyisi
- Yengi Yeziⱪ: Ⱪəxⱪər Yengixǝⱨǝr naⱨiyisi
- SASM/GNC: Kaxgar Yengixahar Nahiyisi
- Siril Yëziqi: Қәшқәр Йеңишәһәр наһийиси

Shule County, also known as Yengisheher County (Uyghur Latin) or Yengixahar County (Uyghur SASM/GNC), is a county of Kashgar Prefecture, in Xinjiang, China. It is located to the south of Kashgar. In ancient times, the Shule area was once the home to a Xiyu oasis civilisation, the Shule Kingdom.

== Etymology ==
Shule originally referred to Kashgar's new city, built by Han Chinese settlers, located 6 miles (9.7 km) from the old one. Shule may have been an attempt by the Chinese to transcribe the Sanskrit name for Kashgar, Śrīkrīrāti (lit. 'fortunate hospitality'). The county's Uyghur name literally means "Kashgar New City".

== History ==
On May 31, 2012, Sidik Kurban was sentenced by Shule County Intermediate People's Court to fifteen years in jail and five years deprivation of political rights for 'inciting ethnic separatism' related to involvement in 'illegal religious activities'. For a decade, he had overseen home-based religious schools for eighty-six students.

== Administrative divisions ==
The county includes 3 towns and 12 townships.

Name	Simplified Chinese	Hanyu Pinyin	Uyghur (UEY)	Uyghur Latin (ULY)	Administrative division code
Towns
Yengisheher Town (Shule Town)	疏勒镇 (英协海尔镇)	Shūlè Zhèn	يېڭىشەھەر بازىرى	yëngisheher baziri	653124100
Hanerik Town	罕南力克镇	Hǎnnánlìkè Zhèn	خانئېرىق بازىرى	xan'ëriq baziri	653124101
Yapchan Town	牙甫泉镇	Yáfǔquán Zhèn	ياپچان بازىرى	yapchan baziri	653124102
Townships
Barin Township	巴仁乡	Bārén Xiāng	بارىن يېزىسى	barin yëzisi	653122200
Yanduma Township	洋大曼乡	Yángdàmàn Xiāng	ياندۇما يېزىسى	yanduma yëzisi	653122201
Yamanyar Township	亚曼牙乡	Yàmànyá Xiāng	يامانيار يېزىسى	yamanyar yëzisi	653122202
Baghchi Township	巴合齐乡	Bāhéqí Xiāng	باغچى يېزىسى	baghchi yëzisi	653122203
Tazghun Township	塔孜洪乡	Tǎzīhóng Xiāng	تازغۇن يېزىسى	tazghun yëzisi	653122204
Yengierik Township	英尔力克乡	Yīng'ěrlìkè Xiāng	يېڭىئېرىق يېزىسى	yëngi'ëriq yëzisi	653122205
Kumusherik Township	库木西力克乡	Kùmùxīlìkè Xiāng	قۇمۇشئېرىق يېزىسى	qumush'ëriq yëzisi	653122206
Tagharchi Township	塔尕尔其乡	Tǎgǎ'ěrqí Xiāng	تاغارچى يېزىسى	tagharchi yëzisi	653122207
Ermudun Township	艾尔木东乡	Ài'ěrmùdōng Xiāng	ئەرمۇدۇن يېزىسى	Ermudun yëzisi	653122208
Aral Township	阿拉力乡	Ālālì Xiāng	ئارال يېزىسى	Aral yëzisi	653122209
Harap Township	阿拉甫乡	Ālāfǔ Xiāng	ھاراپ يېزىسى	harap yëzisi	653122210
Yengiawat Township	英阿瓦提乡	Yīng'āwǎtí Xiāng	يېڭىئاۋات يېزىسى	yëngi'awat yëzisi	653122211

== Economy ==
As of 1885, there was about 85,400 acres (555,448 mu) of cultivated land in Shule.

== Demographics ==
Historical population
Year	Pop.	±% p.a.
2000	284,853	—
2010	312,455	+0.93%

As of 2015, 350,301 of the 377,029 residents of the county were Uyghur, 25,709 were Han Chinese and 1,019 were from other ethnic groups.

As of 1999, 93% of the population of Shule County was Uyghur and 6.7% of the population was Han Chinese.

== Transportation ==
Shule is served by China National Highway 315 and the Kashgar-Hotan Railway.

== Notable persons ==
- Almikhan Seyit / Alimihan Seyiti (ئالمىخان سېيىت / 阿丽米罕·色依提) (in Uyghur), claimed to have died at 132 years old

== Historical maps ==
Maps including Shule:

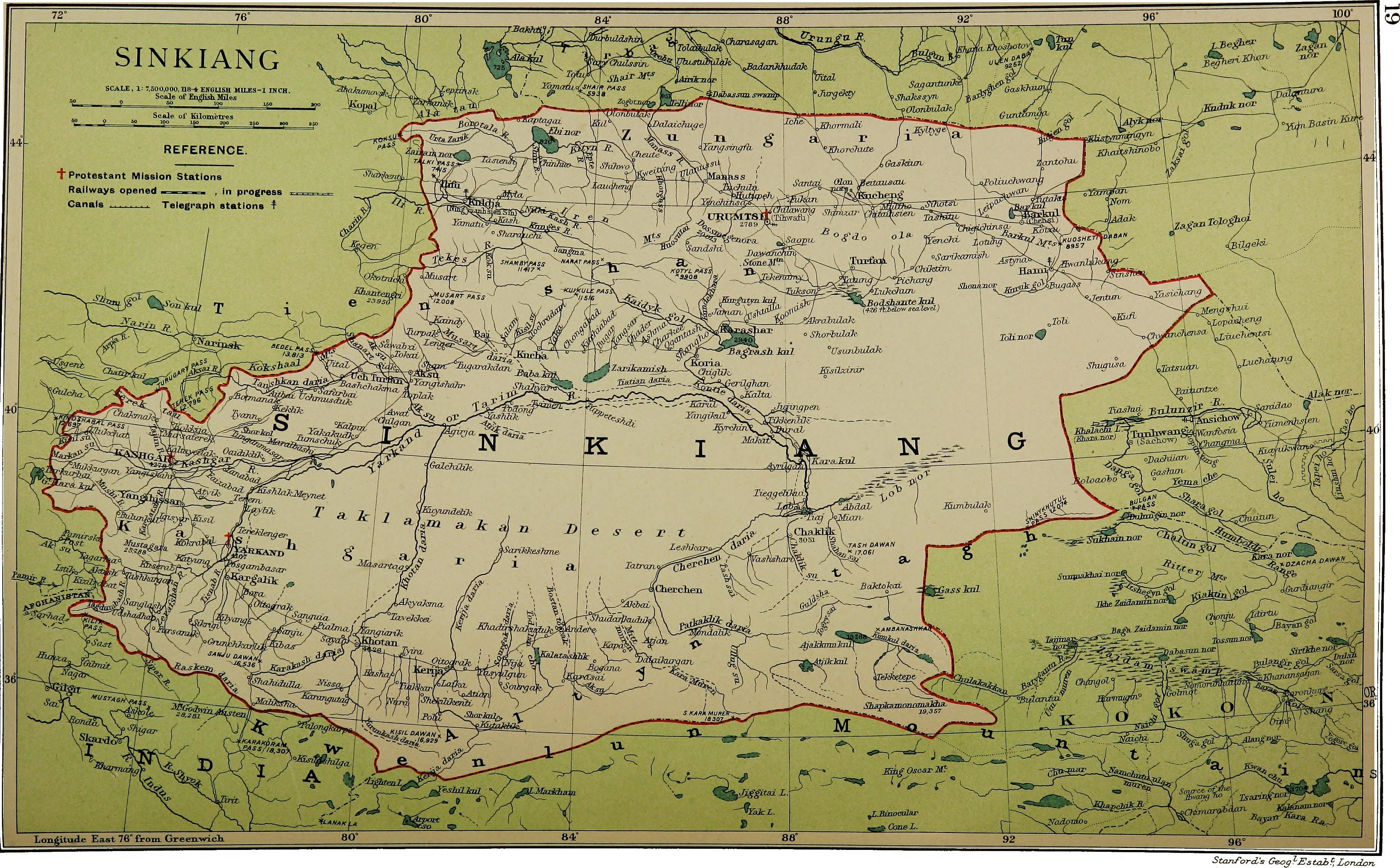
Map including Shule (labeled as Yangishahr) (1917)

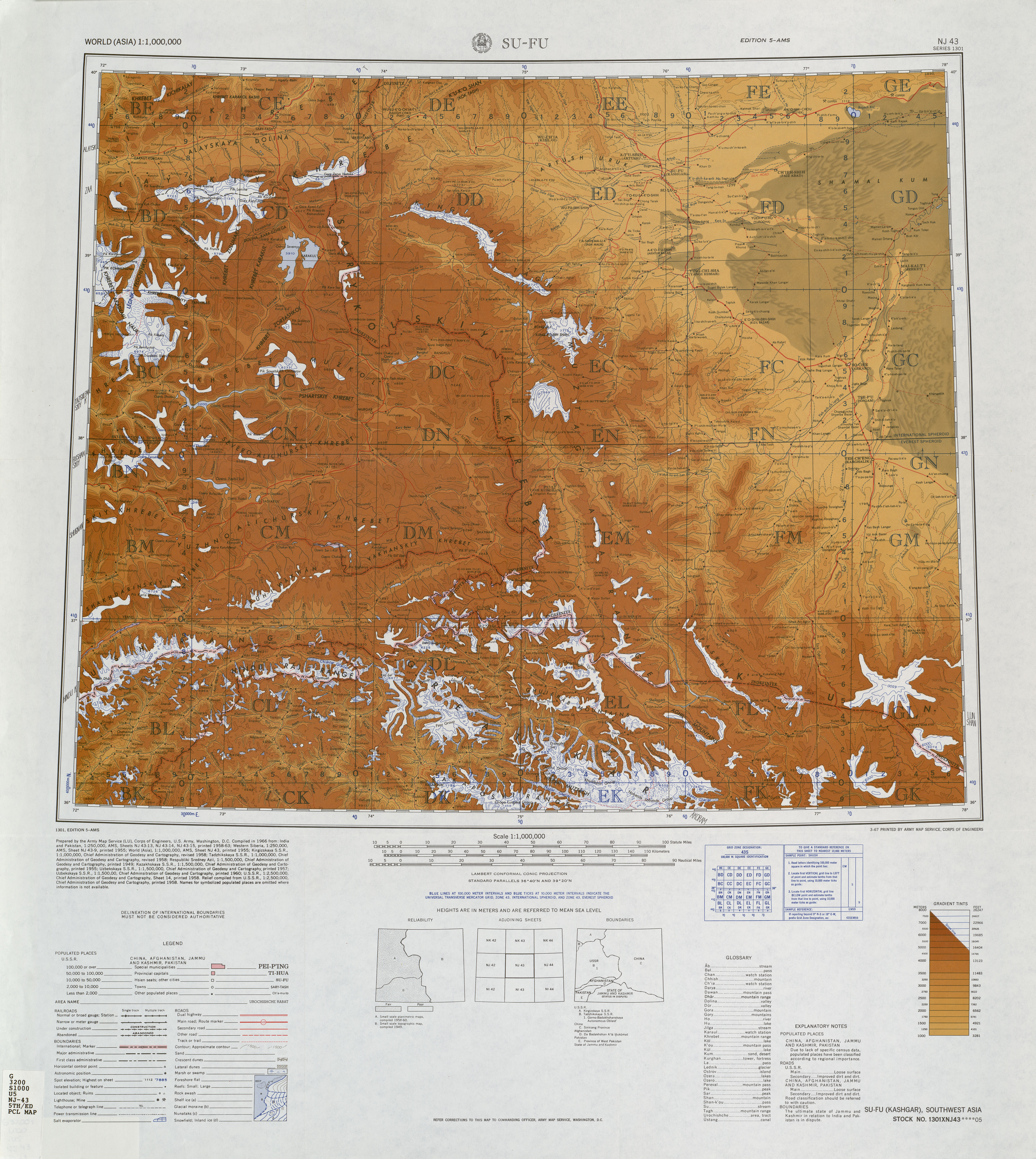
Map including Shule (labeled as SU-LO) from the International Map of the World (AMS, 1966) (Note: From map: "DELINEATION OF INTERNATIONAL BOUNDARIES MUST NOT BE CONSIDERED AUTHORITATIVE")

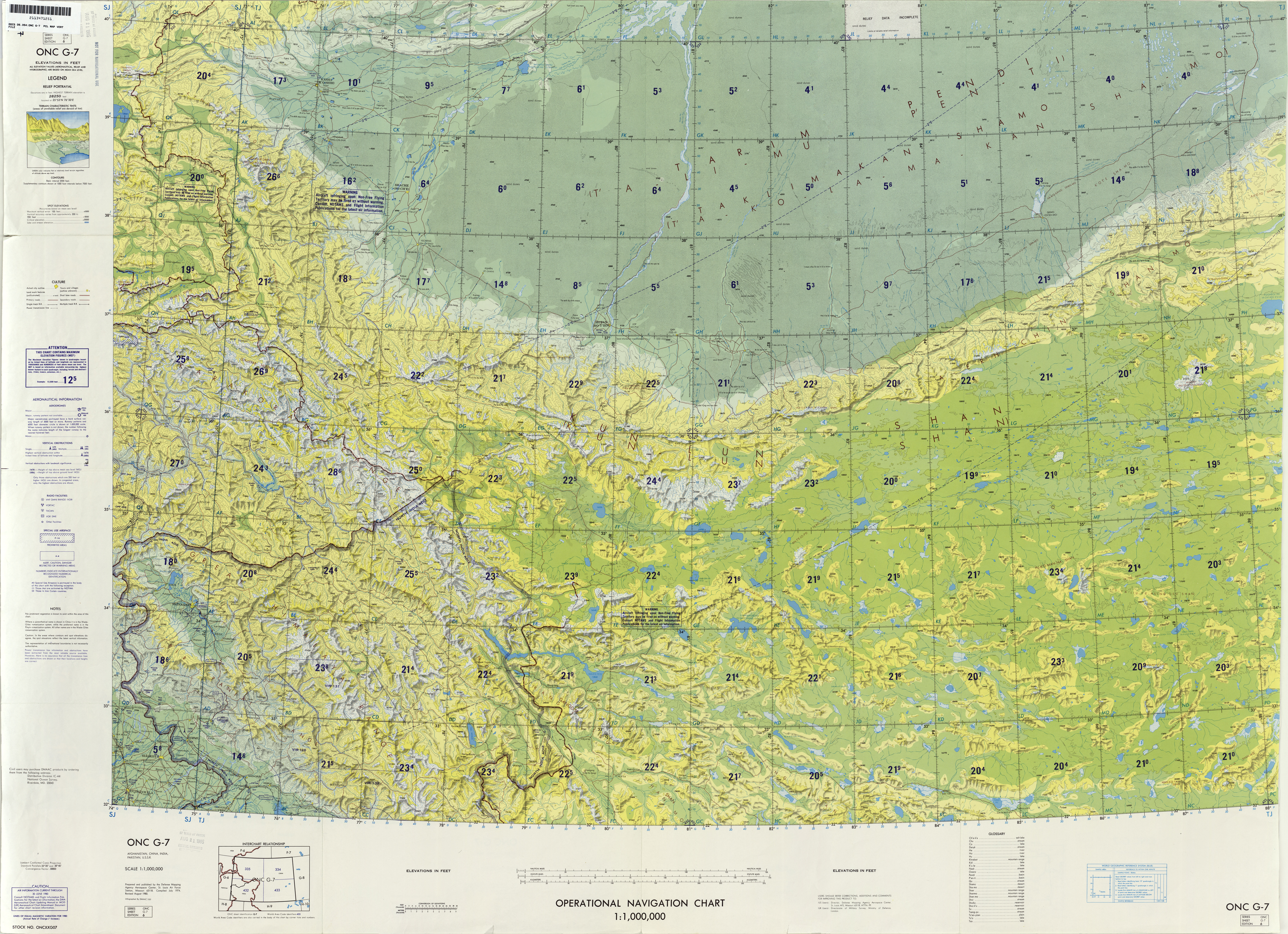
From the Operational Navigation Chart; map including Shule (labeled as SHULE (SU-LE) (walled)) (DMA, 1980) (Note: From map: "The representation of international boundaries is not necessarily authoritative.")

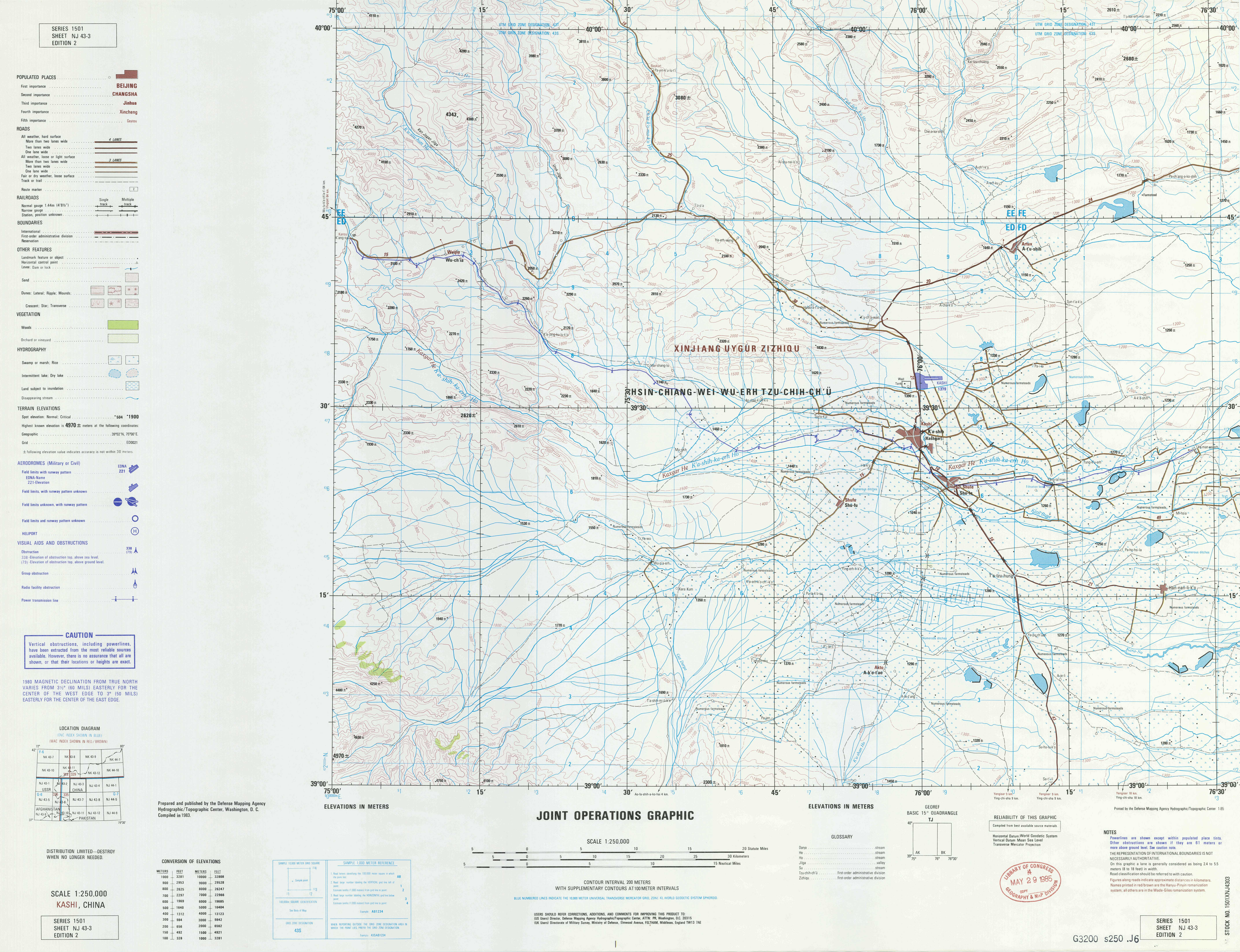
Map including Shule (Shu-le) (DMA, 1983)

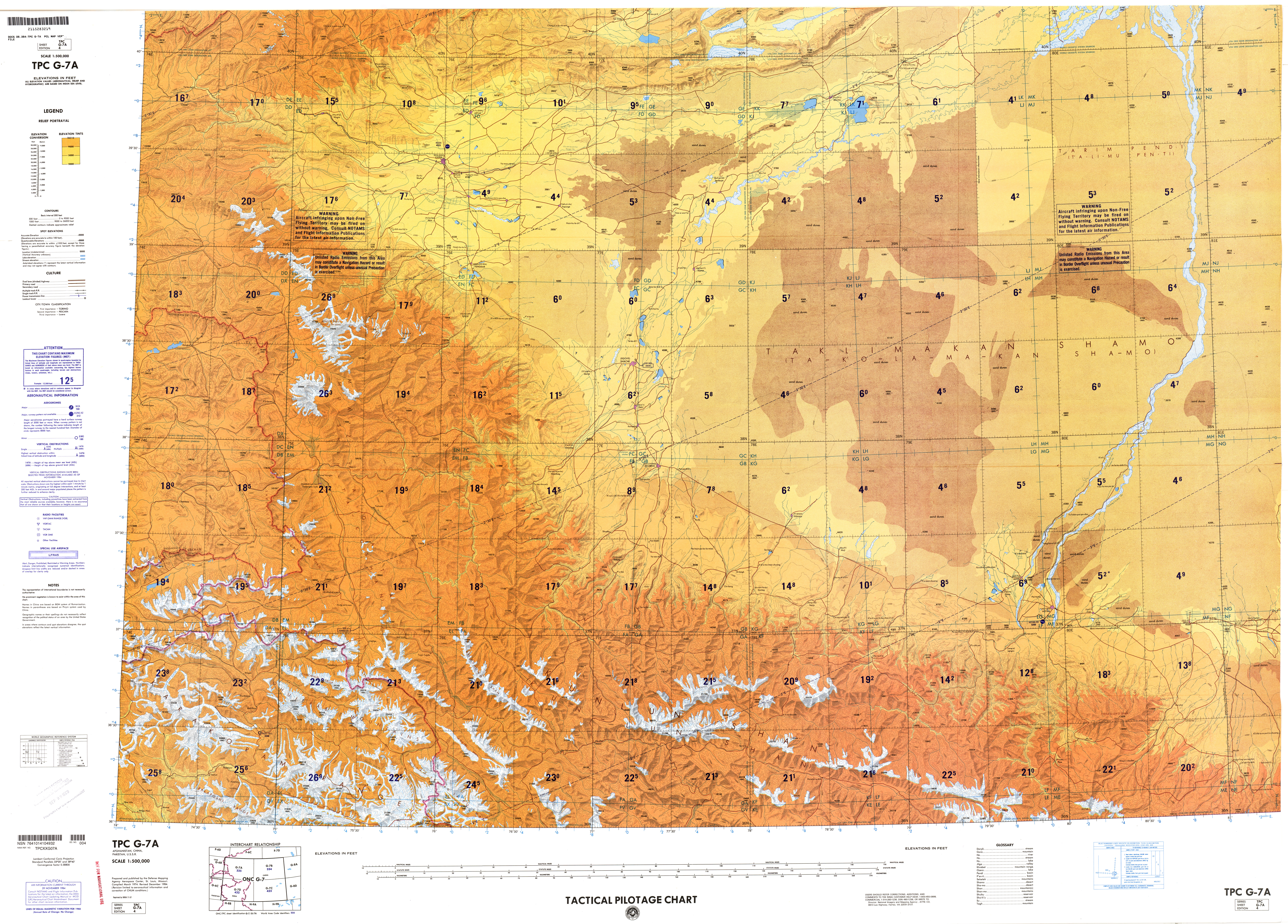
Map including Shule (labeled as SHULE (SU-LE) (walled)) (DMA, 1984) (Note: From map: "The representation of international boundaries is not necessarily authoritative")
