= Konstantin Khrutsky =

Soviet-era military impostor

Konstantin Vikentyevich Khrutsky
- Константин Викентьевич Хруцкий
- Born: 22 March 1879; Verkhneye, Vilna Governorate, Russian Empire (now Hlybokaye District, Vitebsk Region, Belarus)
- Died: 14 February 1969 (aged 89); Novorossiysk, Krasnodar Krai, Russian SFSR, USSR
- Occupations: Church clerk; later an industrial worker; military impostor
- Known for: Claiming to be a centenarian and the last surviving veteran of the Russo-Turkish War (1877–1878)
- Awards: Order of the Badge of Honour (25 January 1965); Jubilee Medal “40 Years of the Armed Forces of the USSR”; Order of Georgi Dimitrov (Bulgaria)

Konstantin Vikentyevich Khrutsky (Russian: Константин Викентьевич Хруцкий; Belarusian: Канстанцін Вікенцьевіч Хруцкі; 22 March [O.S. 10 March] 1879 – 14 February 1969) was a Soviet-era military impostor who successfully passed himself off as a centenarian and the “last participant” of the Russo-Turkish War (1877–1878), allegedly a defender of Shipka Pass and a recipient of the Cross of St. George. In fact, documentary records place his birth in 1879, one year after the war ended, and show that before the World War I he served as a minor clergyman (psalomschik or dyachok) in different Belarusian regions. A similar legend was promoted about his younger brother Samson.

== Fabricated biography ==
Khrutsky entered the Soviet press in 1955, when he was presented as a centenarian. A short note in the newspaper Sovetskaya Kuban (February 1955), citing Khrutsky's own account, also claimed extraordinary longevity for his forebears (with ages such as 139 for a great-grandfather, 123 for a grandfather, 112 for his father, and 105 for an older brother). Variations of these figures were repeated in later publications.

Journalists then retailed a full “life story” of the supposed long-liver. In this version he was born in 1855 in a Belarusian village in a large family, ran away from home to study. According to the same narrative, he entered a teachers’ seminary in Molodechno in 1873. In 1875 he was drafted and served in the Preobrazhensky Regiment; in 1877 he supposedly fought in the Russo-Turkish War, distinguished himself at Shipka and Siege of Plevna, and received two Crosses of St. George. The story continued that after military service he returned to Molodechno, completed the seminary in June 1885, and worked as a teacher for more than thirty years. In 1915, during World War I, he allegedly left the Grodno Governorate for Moscow, worked in various offices, and gravitated toward the revolutionary movement. After the February Revolution he was said to have served in “self-defence” units, arresting former policemen and gendarmes. In 1923 Khrutsky and his family moved to Novorossiysk. He worked first as a stone receiver and later as an electric-motor operator at the Proletariy cement plant.

== Public attention ==
After the “centenary” celebrations in the mid-1950s, Khrutsky's life changed dramatically: Soviet newspapers began running stories about the “hero” of the Russo-Turkish War. In 1955, at the initiative of the All-Slavic Committee, he was awarded a “For Military Merit” medal, followed by the Bulgarian Order of Georgi Dimitrov. That September he visited Bulgaria at the invitation of the nationwide committee for Bulgarian-Soviet friendship and was received at a state level.

He effectively became a national hero in Bulgaria under the nickname “Dyado Khrutski” (“Grandpa Khrutski”). He visited the key memorial sites of the war, was presented with a specially tailored Bulgarian volunteer militia uniform, later a staple of his photographs, and returned to the USSR “with an entire railcar of gifts”. In interviews and on trips he readily gave vivid, detail-rich accounts of the war, spoke of Russian heroism and Ottoman atrocities, and even sang war songs, including ones he claimed to have composed in his youth.

For almost fifteen years afterward, letters and gifts continued to arrive from Bulgaria in Novorossiysk. Khrutsky also remained in close touch with Soviet admirers: he gave public talks at clubs and factories and at Young Pioneers gatherings, received many congratulatory messages, and was even elected a delegate to a congress of the Russian Society of the Deaf. In 1956 he was allocated a new apartment (an important privilege in the Soviet society), and in 1965, marking what was presented as his 110th birthday, the alleged supercentenarian received the Order of the Badge of Honour. His first wife died in 1958, after which Konstantin remarried with a much younger woman. After his death in 1969, Bulgarian newspapers published condolences from Todor Zhivkov to Khrutsky's widow. In 1988, to mark the 110th anniversary of Bulgaria's Liberation, a Bulgarian record was released featuring Khrutsky's wartime reminiscences. The heroic version of his story continues to circulate in Bulgaria.

Khrutsky had a younger brother, Samson, who lived in Brest, Belarus. He, too, was ultimately portrayed as a centenarian, with a similarly heroic biography attributed to him in the Soviet press: service in the Russo-Japanese War, participation in the Battle of Tsushima, both world wars, partisan activity, and family losses under Nazi occupation. Samson’s name and legend were first mentioned in the Soviet press in 1958, reportedly by Konstantin himself. Samson was still alive in 1980, and his story resurfaced several times in Belarusian media.

== Criticism ==
His story was not seriously challenged during his lifetime as fitting the heroic Soviet-Bulgarian friendship narrative. Only after Khrutsky's death, his story started to be put into doubt. No documentary confirmation of the pre-1955 “heroic” biography has been ever found. Almost all Soviet-era accounts rest on Khrutsky's own stories, and no material evidence of his participation in the Russo-Turkish War has survived.

While Khrutsky's real biography was long unknown, critics first pointed out that his detailed autobiographies, impressive for their “excellent memory”, proved riddled with historical errors on close reading. For example, one version claimed that his “baptism of fire” came during the taking of Varna, although Russian troops entered Varna after the war had ended. There was a Russian-led Siege of Varna, commemorated by a medal, but back in 1828. He also placed himself at widely separated points of the front regardless of actual chronology or the genuine combat route of the Preobrazhensky Regiment. An autobiography dated 28 March 1957 likewise contained numerous inconsistencies. The Preobrazhensky Regiment, which left the capital for the campaign only on 28 August 1877, could not have crossed the Danube near Zimnitsa on 15 June. Nor did it take part in the liberation of Plevna or the defence of Shipka, two actions for which Khrutsky claimed (one each) Cross of St. George. Meanwhile, exactly these two battles were the major highlights of the war in the Soviet and Bulgarian historical narrative of the day.

The artifacts provided by Khrutsky also essentially backfired: the serial number of a “soldier’s Cross of St. George (4th class)” allegedly bestowed on Khrutsky by Mikhail Skobelev, 803075, actually belongs to World War I; a cross with that number was awarded in 1915 to a private named Fyodor Todos. In the Soviet period this discrepancy went unnoticed. Former Novorossiysk city museum director A. V. Dmitriev recalled being handed a watch allegedly awarded to Khrutsky for crossing the Danube under fire on 15 June 1877; the watch turned out to be of Soviet manufacture.

As doubts mounted, Novorossiysk museum staff removed information about Khrutsky from their exhibition. Later research also established that neither Khrutsky nor any other person with the surname appears in the published lists of Preobrazhensky Regiment enlisted men decorated during the 1877–1878 war. According to S. G. Novikov, the first versions of Khrutsky's Shipka story may have been prompted by the film Heroes of Shipka, released that same year.

== Documentary record ==
A definitive proof of Khrutsky's hoax was found later as his real biography emerged. Church “clergy registers” (klirovye vedomosti) for the church in Kleszczele (now in Poland) list Konstantin V. Khrutsky as a clerk (psalomschik/dyachok) there in 1903 and give his birth year as 1879, one year after the end of the Russo-Turkish War. These data were published by researchers of Orthodox clergy within the territory of Poland.

According to the parish register records, the clergyman Konstantin Vikentyevich Khrutsky and the so-called “hero of Shipka” share not only the same full name, but also the birthplace and the names of their wife, children, and brothers, so there can be no doubt that they are one and the same person. Khrutsky's brothers, Iosif and Samson, were likewise not centenarians.

From 1901 to 1914, Khrutsky served in the same position in several churches in areas that are now Poland and Belarus; notices of his postings appeared in diocesan gazettes. During World War I, he left church service and moved with his family to Moscow, where he worked as a municipal official until at least 1917. No documentary evidence has yet been found for his life between then and his emergence in the press in 1954.

His father, Vikenty Osipovich Khrutsky, was also a church clerk, and the Khrutskys belonged to an extensive Belarusian lineage of clergy and church workers. In the Polish-Lithuanian Commonwealth, Khrutsky priests (known since the 16th century) were Uniates and belonged to the nobility (coat of arms Leliwa).

== Awards ==
Only awards attested by documentary evidence are listed below:

- Order of the Badge of Honour (25 January 1965)
- Jubilee Medal “40 Years of the Armed Forces of the USSR”
- Order of Georgi Dimitrov (Bulgaria)

== Sources ==
- Dimitr Shumilov, “Poslednyaya vstrecha s legendarnym geroem” (Tekhnika—Molodyozhi, 1978, no. 3), p. 21.
- Sergey Novikov, “Na Shipke emu tselovali ruki” (Novorossiyskie vesti, Novorossiysk, 11 October 2008, no. 85 (486), pp. 4–5). (Link later became unavailable; archived copy exists.)
- A. Denisov and G. Cholak, Bolgariya, sestra rodnaya (Kishinev: Kartya Moldovenyaske, 1967), p. 60.
- Yu. Krivonosov, “Dyado Khrutsky” (Ogonyok, 1968, no. 10), pp. 10–11.
