= Prolepsis =

Prolepsis may refer to:

- Prolepsis (rhetoric), a figure of speech in which the speaker raises an objection and then immediately answers it
- Prolepsis (literary), an anticipated event or action in the story, also known as a flashforward
- Cataphora, using an expression or word that co-refers with a later expression in the discourse
- Flashforward, in storytelling, an interjected scene that represent events in the future
- Prolepsis, one of the three criteria of truth in Epicureanism
- Prolepsis (fly), a genus of robber flies
- Prolepsis (album), by Arrogance

== See also ==
- Déjà vu, the experience of feeling sure that one has already witnessed or experienced a current situation
- Paralipsis, providing full details or drawing attention to something while pretending to pass it over
- Proleptic (disambiguation)
