= Cenling County =

Cenling County سېنلىڭ ناھىيىسى (Uyghur) 岑岭县 (Chinese)
- County
- Interactive map of Cenling County
- Country: China
- Autonomous region: Xinjiang
- Prefecture: Kashgar
- County seat: Xinhua Town
- Time zone: UTC+8 (China Standard (Note: Locals in Xinjiang frequently observe UTC+6 (Xinjiang Time), 2 hours behind Beijing.))

Cenling County

Uyghur name
- Uyghur: سېنلىڭ ناھىيىسى
Transcriptions
- Latin Yëziqi: Sënling nahiyisi
- Siril Yëziqi: Сенлиң наһийиси

Chinese name
- Traditional Chinese: 岑嶺縣
- Simplified Chinese: 岑岭县
Transcriptions
Standard Mandarin
- Hanyu Pinyin: Cénlǐng Xiàn
- Wade–Giles: Ts'en^{2}-ling^{3} Hsien^{4}

Cenling County (Uyghur: سېنلىڭ ناھىيىسى; Chinese: 岑岭县) is a county in Kashgar Prefecture, Xinjiang Uyghur Autonomous Region, China. It was established in March 2026.

== History ==
On 26 March 2026, the people's government of China's Xinjiang Uygur Autonomous Region announced the establishment of Cenling County. The establishment of the county, administered by Kashgar Prefecture, was approved by the Central Committee of the Chinese Communist Party and the State Council of the People's Republic of China.
