= Alimihan Seyiti =

Chinese supercentenarian

- 阿丽米罕·色依提
- Born: June 25, 1886 (disputed); Xinjiang, Qing Empire
- Died: December 16, 2021 (claimed age 135); People's Republic of China
- Citizenship: Chinese

Alimihan Seyiti (Uyghur: ئالمىخان سېيىت; June 25, 1886 (claimed) – December 16, 2021) was a Chinese supercentenarian of Uyghur descent, who was claimed to be one of the last survivors of the 19th century. She claimed to have been born in 19th century but due to a lack of a reliable birth registration system, her exact age could not be internationally verified by Guinness World Records.

== Biography ==
Alimihan Seyiti was claimed to have been born in 1886 in Komuserik Township, Yengixahar County of Kashgar in Qing dynasty's ruled Xinjiang. She was a farmer and, above all, an expert in herbology. She had been living in Komuserik since then. She married at 17 and had two adopted children. Widowed in 1976, she later had 43 grandchildren and great-grandchildren.

Since 2013, she topped the list of China's oldest people compiled by the China Association of Gerontology and Geriatrics, formerly known as the Gerontological Society of China. The China Association of Gerontology and Geriatrics declared her in 2013 to be the country's oldest living citizen. This was after the death of Luo Meizhen in 2013. Prior to that, she had been ranked second among the top ten oldest people in China for three years in a row. Since China did not have a reliable birth registration system when she was born, her age was questioned by media outlets, and she was not officially recognized by the Guinness Book of World Records. Due to this the record of oldest person stayed with Frenchwoman Jeanne Calment.

She credited her age to her habit of drinking cold water and her relatively youthful appearance was due to "washing her face".

=== Death ===
She died on December 16, 2021 at her home, without confirmation whether she died from COVID-19 or other causes.
