= Zimnica =

Zimnica or Zimnitsa may refer to:

- Zimnica (river) in Poland
- Zimnica, Lower Silesian Voivodeship in Gmina Oleśnica, Oleśnica County in Lower Silesian Voivodeship (SW Poland)
- the Bulgarian villages of:
  - Zimnitsa, Dobrich Province
  - Zimnitsa, Stara Zagora Province
  - Zimnitsa, Yambol Province
