= Proleptic calendar =

A proleptic calendar is a calendar that is applied to dates before its introduction. Examples include:

- Proleptic Gregorian calendar
- Proleptic Julian calendar
- Symmetry454
