= Khanar =

Khanar खनार
- Town
- Location in Nepal
- Coordinates: 26.63°N 87.28°E
- Country: Nepal
- Zone: Koshi Zone
- District: Sunsari District

Population (2011)
  - Total: 20,323 Population male = 10,217 Population female = 10,106
- Time zone: UTC+5:45 (Nepal Time)
- Website: royalenfielditahari.com

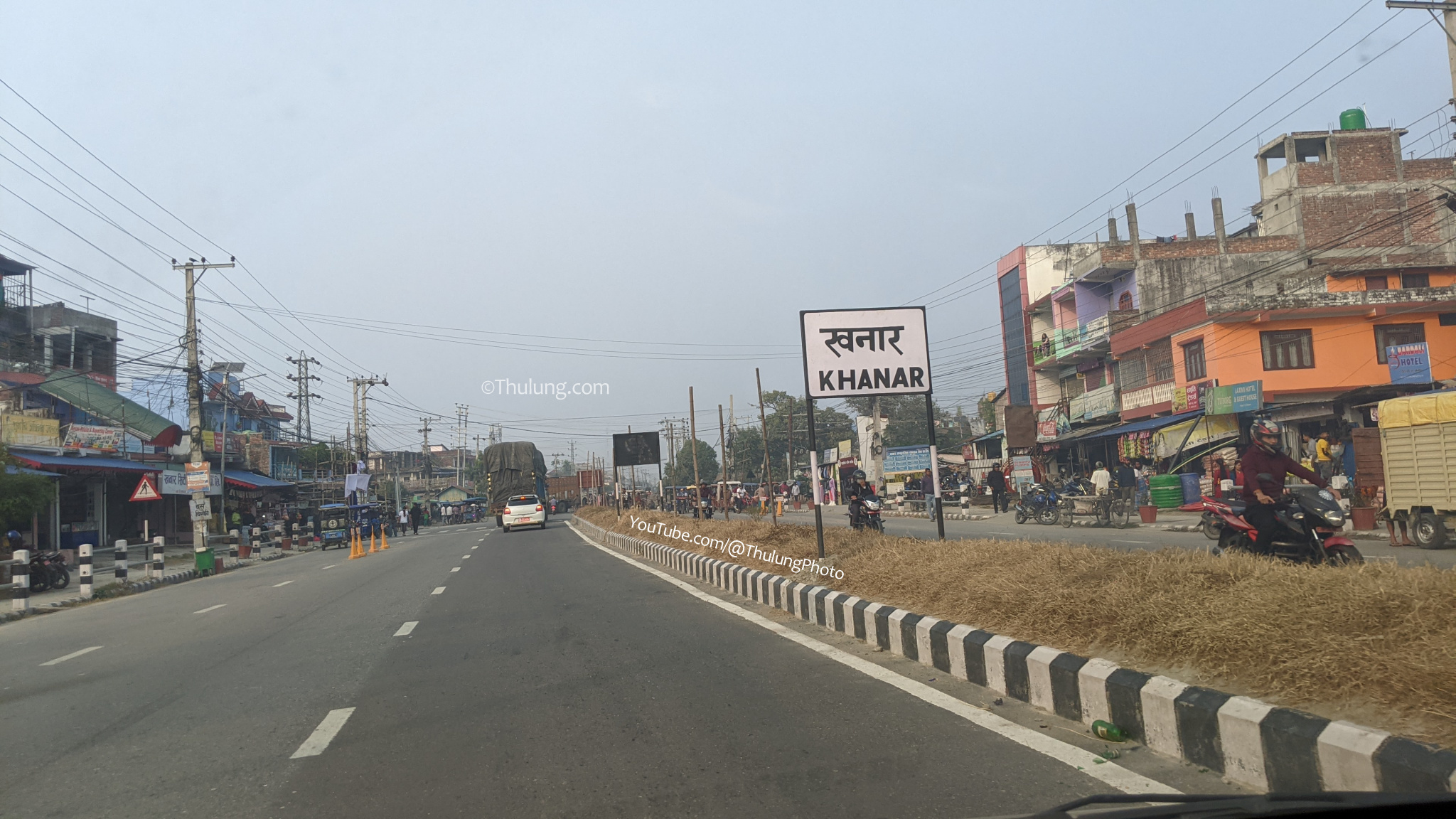
Khanar, Sunsari Eastern Nepal.

Khanar is a town in Itahari in Sunsari District in the Koshi Zone of south-eastern Nepal. The VDC village development committee was merged to form the submetropolis in June 2014. At the time of the 2011 Nepal census it had a population of 20,323 people living in 5,130 individual households. It lies 4 km south from Itahari Municipality and 6 km north from Duhabi vdc. Khanar is an industrial vdc with hundreds of industries. It is divided into 9 wards.

== History ==
There are many arguments about the naming of Khanar. Some argue that the name of Khanar was named after the former King Khankar, who used to rule here long time ago. Some argue that there stood a ruin of a palace, a khandahar. And locals named the place Khandahar and then khanhaar, the corruption of the word. The Tharu community is the oldest community of Khanar. There is no specific date but they have been living at Khanar for a long time. They are concentrated mainly in 1, 2, 3,4,5,6, 7,8 and 9 number wards. <Purataatwik Sthal Bhediyari, Ek Adhyayan; Sunita Pokhrel, Biratnagar>

== Geography ==
Located in the Eastern Region of Nepal, Khanar VDC is developing so rapidly because of high industries here.

== Education & Literature ==
Shree Sharda Higher Secondary School and khanar Sunshine English School is considered as the main educational foundation of Khanar, which was established in 2007 B.S. There are couple elementary and middle schools in Khanar. There are like half dozen of private schools too.

== Industries ==
Khanar is also known for its industries. There are dozens of small and big industries. Reliance Spinning Mills Ltd, Ami Apparels (P) Ltd and several other industries are located.
