= Havilah =

Biblical land and people

Havilah (Biblical Hebrew: חֲוִילָה, romanized: Ḥăwīlā) refers to both a land and people in several books of the Bible; one is mentioned in Genesis 2:10–11, while the other is mentioned in the Generations of Noah (Genesis 10:7).

In Genesis 2:10–11, Havilah is associated with the Garden of Eden. Two individuals named Havilah are listed in the Table of Nations as descendants of Noah. The name also appears in Genesis 25:18, defining the territory of the Ishmaelites. Extrabiblical literature mentions Havilah as the source of precious jewels used by the Amorites.

The exact location of Havilah is debated, with various scholars suggesting southwest of the Arabian Peninsula or Somalia.

== Biblical mentions ==
In one case, Havilah is associated with the Garden of Eden mentioned in the Genesis creation narrative:

A river issues from Eden to water the garden, and it then divides and becomes four branches. The name of the first is Pishon, the one that winds through the whole land of Havilah, where the gold is. The gold of that land is good; bdellium is there, and lapis lazuli.

— Genesis 2:10–13

In addition to the region described in chapter 2 of Genesis, two individuals named Havilah are listed in the Generations of Noah. The Table lists the descendants of Noah, who are considered eponymous ancestors of nations. Besides the name mentioned in Genesis 10:7–29, another is mentioned in the Books of Chronicles (1 Chronicles 1:9–23). One person is the son of Cush, the son of Ham. The other person is a son of Joktan and descendant of Shem.

The name Havilah appears in Genesis 25:18, where it defines the territory inhabited by the Ishmaelites as being "from Havilah to Shur, opposite (or "east of" according to other translations) Egypt in the direction of Assyria"; and in the Books of Samuel (1 Samuel 15:7–8), which states that king Saul smote the Amalekites who were living there, except for King Agag, whom he took prisoner.

One passage mentions Israelites being sent to Assyria and Halah. According to the monk Antoine Augustin Calmet, Halah most likely indicates Havilah.

== Extra-biblical mentions ==
In extra-biblical literature, the land of Havilah is mentioned in Pseudo-Philo as the source of the precious jewels that the Amorites used in fashioning their idols in the days after Joshua, when Kenaz was judge over the Israelites.

There is an extra-biblical tradition found in the Kitab al-Magall (Clementine literature) and the Cave of Treasures. According to this tale, in the early days after the Tower of Babel, the children of Havilah, son of Joktan built a city and kingdom, which was near to those of his brothers, Sheba and Ophir.

== Possible location ==
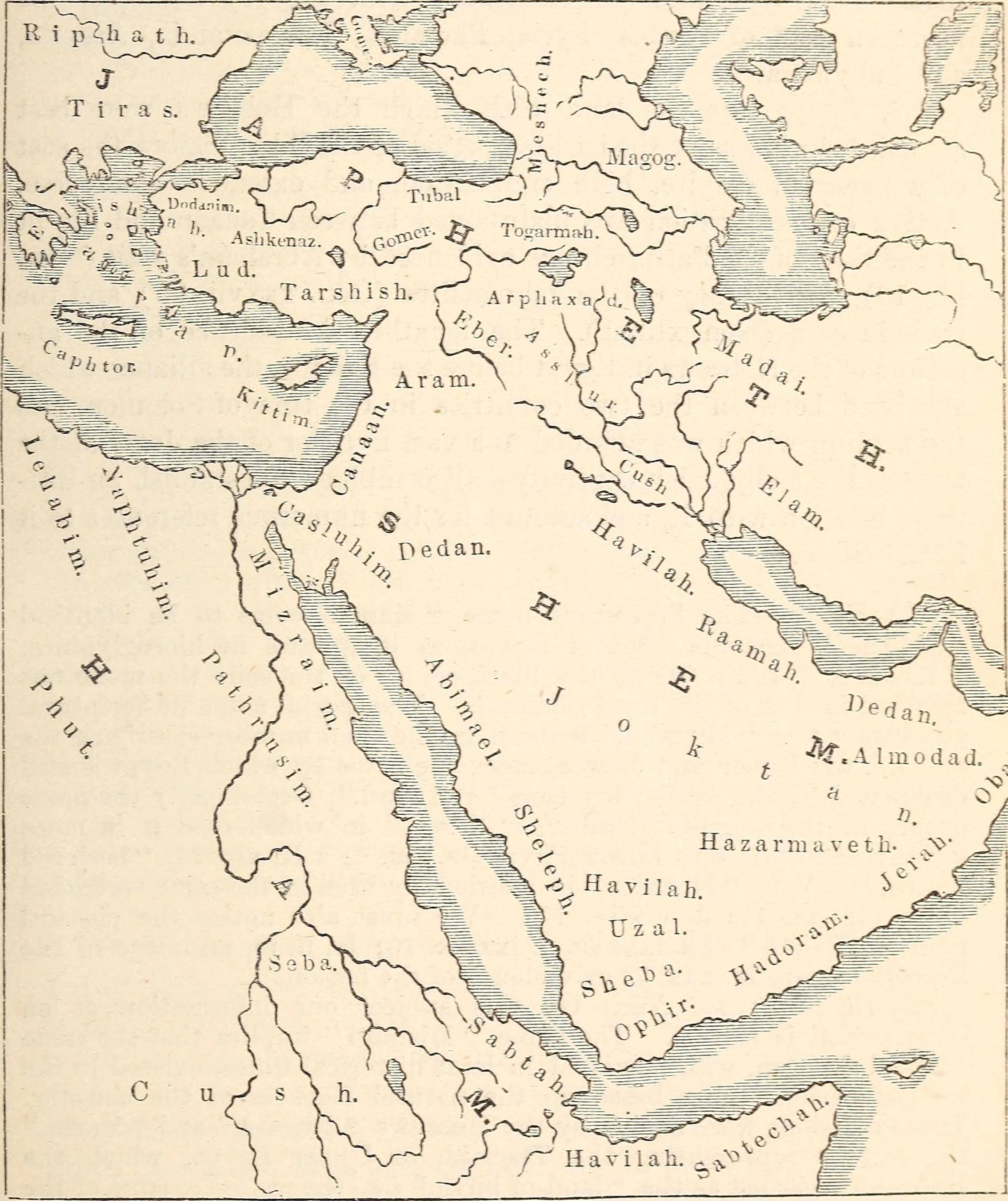
Several locations for Havilah are shown

=== African hypothesis ===
W.F. Albright, in the 1922 publication The Location Of The Garden Of Eden, states:

The Havilah of Genesis, chapter 2, refers certainly to the African Havilah, rather than to the Asiatic Havilah which lay opposite, since it is said to produce good gold, gum resin, and malachite, all of which are important products of the Nubian Desert, and two of which, at least, do not seem to have been found in western Arabia.

Albright goes on further to illustrate:

Genesis chapter 10 gives the name "Havilah" twice, once in verse 7, among the sons of Cush (Ethiopia) after Seba, and the second time in verse [29], among the sons of Joktan, immediately after Sheba and Ophir. There is no reason to suppose, as is popular nowadays, that the sections came from different hands; we have rather an unskilful attempt to state the fact that there were two divisions, one African, the other Asiatic.

The Havilah (or Hawilah in Hebrew) which Albright is referencing is Hawila, Sudan, a place found in the Khartoum region of the country.

Saadia Gaon's tenth-century Arabic translation of the Hebrew Bible substitutes Havilah with Zeila in Somalia. The ancient city of Avalites is thought to have been a demonym for Havilah. Gesenius identified Avalites as a city belonging to the sons of Cush. Benjamin Tudela, the twelfth-century Jewish traveler, claimed Zeila region was the land of Havilah confined by Al-Habash on the west. Zeila (Havilah) had been sacked by the Portuguese governor of Old Goa, Lopo Soares de Albergaria, while its Harla chief Mahfuz invaded Abyssinia in 1517.

Havilah has also been associated with the ancient Macrobians, who, according to Franz Delitzsch, had close ties with the neighbouring people of South Arabia.

Augustus Henry Keane believed that the land of Havilah was centered on Great Zimbabwe and was roughly contemporaneous with what was then Southern Rhodesia. Havilah Camp was the name of the base camp of a group of British archaeologists who studied the Great Zimbabwe ruins from 1902 to 1904. In the end, they rejected any biblical connection with the settlement.

=== Arabian hypothesis ===
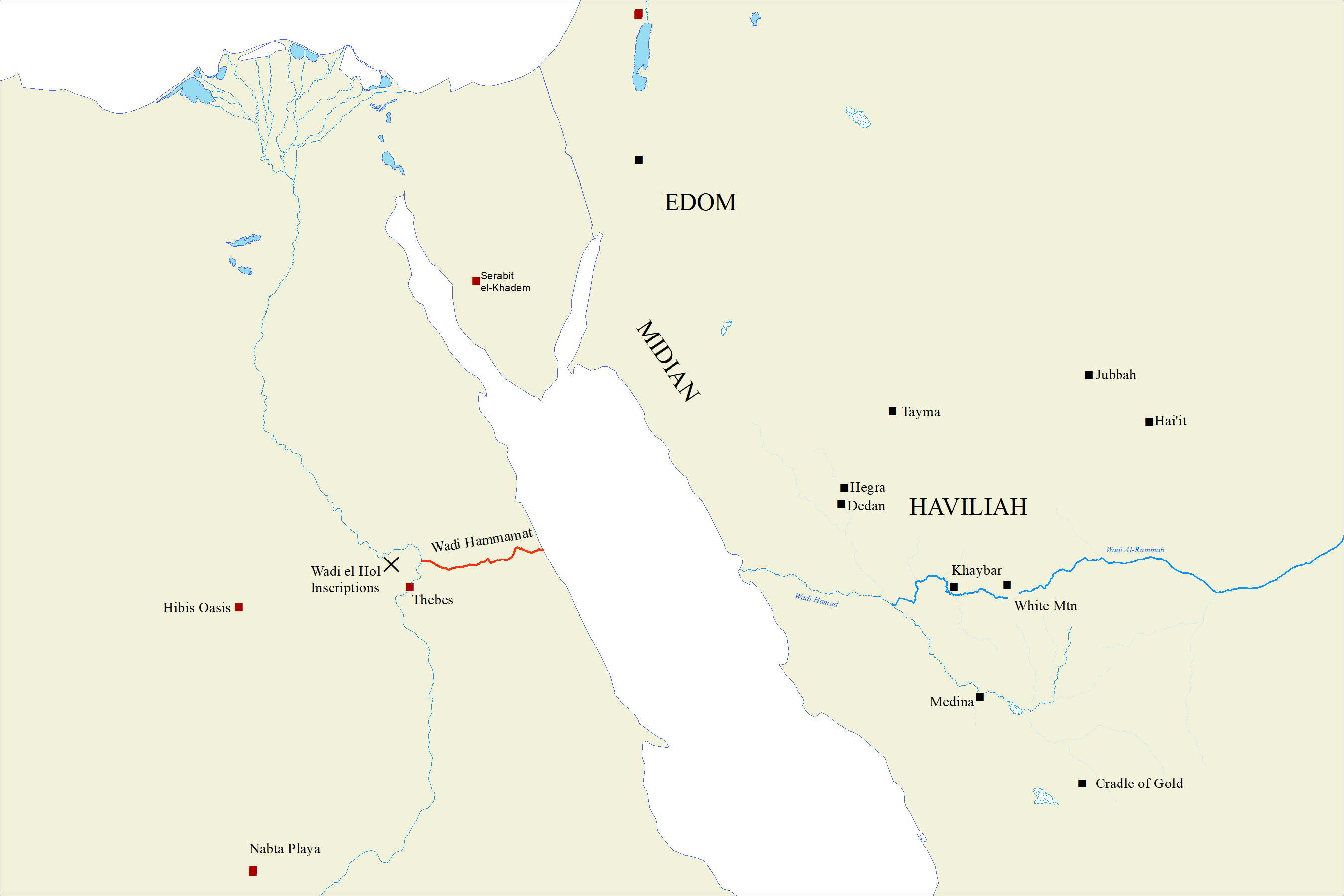
Map of Havilah

In 1844, Charles Forster argued that a trace of the ancient name Havilah could still be found in the use of Aval for what is now known as Bahrain Island.

W. W. Müller, in the 1992 Anchor Bible Dictionary, believes that biblical Havilah refers to two different locations on western Arabia.

- Genesis 2 is region in southwest Arabia.
- Genesis 25:18 is a northern Arabian location, possibly Medina Province.

There are a number of features in Medina Province which match the description such as gold deposits, a location on the incense road, and remains of Neolithic and Bronze Age civilizations in the Harrat region.

The Arabian hypothesis is further strengthened by former curator of the Harvard Semitic Museum James A. Sauer's identification of the Pishon, which is described as encircling Havilah in the Bible, as the Wadi-al Rummah, a dry channel which begins in the Hijaz Mountains, near Medina, to run northeast to Kuwait. Sauer makes this identification based on geology and history. In addition, Bible commentators believe that Havilah should be Arabian because the Ishmaelites, who settled between Havilah and Shur, were ancestors of Arabs.

=== Asian hypothesis ===
Sir Walter Raleigh appears to identify Havilah with Tibet, complementing with Josephus' identification of the Pishon as the Ganges.

== See also ==
- Mustatil
- Desert kite
- Harrat Khaybar
- Mahd Al-Dhahab
- Al-Ula
- Amud
- Hegra
