= Timothy Ives =

American archeologist (born 1973)

Timothy H. Ives is an American archeologist and a leading contributor to the contemporary debate over the origins of the stone heaps found in New England's forested hills.

== Early life and education ==
Ives was born in 1973. He received his bachelor's degree in anthropology from the University of Connecticut in 1996, his master's degree in anthropology from the College of William & Mary in 2001, and his doctoral degree in anthropology from the University of Connecticut in 2010.

== Career ==
Ives has pursued interests in New England's archaeology, history, and culture. He previously worked for cultural resource management companies, as a consultant for the Mashantucket Pequot Museum and Research Center, as an adjunct professor for the University of Connecticut's Anthropology Department, and as Principal Archaeologist for the Rhode Island Historical Preservation and Heritage Commission. He has published peer-reviewed research on several topics, including coastal archaeological survey, lithic analysis, site formation processes, and colonial-era ethnohistory.

== Contributions to New England's stone heap debate ==
Ives supports the working hypothesis that most of the stone heaps in New England's forested hills were assembled in the nineteenth century to consolidate fieldstones picked from immediately surrounding farmland, and that this knowledge fell from popular memory after losing social relevance. He has published various lines of supporting evidence, including nineteenth century written accounts of agricultural stone heaping practices.

Several of southern New England's Native American tribal authorities maintain that many, perhaps most, of these stone heaps are sacred, having been constructed by Native Americans as elements of ceremonial stone landscapes that are unrecognizable to archaeologists. This position was adopted by the intertribal congress known as the United South and Eastern Tribes, Inc. in 2007. Ives remains skeptical of ceremonial stone landscape theory, noting that it was independently developed by Euro-American antiquarians prior to its endorsement by Native American tribal authorities, and has expressed concern regarding the broader social costs of ceremonial stone landscape preservation campaigns, citing their record of mobilizing white guilt, the psychosocial phenomenon described by race relations scholar Shelby Steele, to gain political support and subvert criticism.

Researchers who employ ceremonial stone landscape theory generally reject Ives' contributions to the stone heap debate. Curtiss Hoffman, Emeritus Professor of Anthropology from Bridgewater State University, qualified Ives' model explaining how stone heaps in former pastures may have been built as an "attempt to fabricate a forgotten eighteenth-century farm use for stone structures." Avocational researchers have criticized Ives as well. For example, James and Mary E. Gage have claimed that his model "is not scientifically valid and it should not be used" and Nohham Cachat-Schilling characterized it as "conjecture" that "fails upon real-life testing and practical farm economics."

== Publications ==
=== Books ===
- Stones of Contention New English Review, 2021)

=== Articles ===
- "Historical Accounts of Forgotten Stone-Heaping Practices on Nineteenth-Century Hill Farms", Northeast Historical Archaeology, Vol. 49, Article 10, 2020.
- "Remembering Stone Piles in New England", Northeast Anthropology, 79/80:37–80, 2013.
- "Uncloaking the Ruins of Rhode Island's 'Lost Civilization'", Providence Journal, April 16, 2014. Retrieved February 6, 2019.
- "Cairnfields in New England's Forgotten Pastures", Archaeology of Eastern North America, 43:119–132, 2015.Cairnfields in New England's Forgotten Pastures
- "Romance, Redemption, and Ceremonial Stone Landscapes", Bulletin of the Archaeological Society of Connecticut, 77:151–166, 2015.
- "The Hunt for Redneck Archaeology: Disentangling 'White Guilt,' Ceremonial Stone Landscape Activism, and Professional Archaeology in New England", Northeast Anthropology, 85/86:47–72, 2018.
- "Stone Heaping Practices of Nineteenth-Century Farmers: New Insights from Archival Sources. Invited Presentation for the Annual Meeting of the Barrington Preservation Society, January 26, 2020. Video recorded by David Weed. Retrieved February 20, 2020. via YouTube
- "Legends of Rock", The Spectator World, 3(1):38-40, 2022.
