= Ceremonial stone landscape =

Type of stonework site in North America

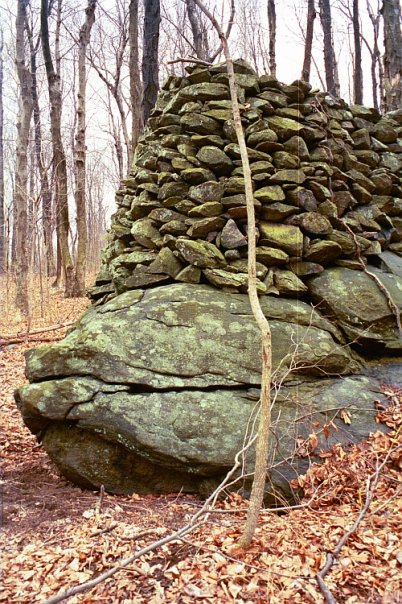
Cairn at the Oley Hills site

Ceremonial Stone Landscapes is the term used by USET, United Southern and Eastern Tribes, Inc., a nonprofit, intertribal organization of American Indians, for certain stonework sites in eastern North America. Elements often found at these sites include dry stone walls, rock piles (sometimes referred to as cairns), stone chambers, unusually-shaped boulders, split boulders with stones inserted in the split, and boulders propped up off the ground with smaller rocks. While neither the age of these sites nor the idea of their creation by indigenous peoples has been accepted generally, interest in the sites is increasing. This interest is generated in part by USET's Resolution #2007:037, entitled Sacred Ceremonial Stone Landscapes Found in the Ancestral Territories of United Southern and Eastern Tribes, Inc. Member Tribes.

Sections of the USET resolution describing these sites read as follows:

"within the ancestral territories of the USET Tribes there exist sacred ceremonial stone landscapes and their stone structures which are of particular cultural value to certain member Tribes;"

"for thousands of years before the immigration of Europeans, the medicine people of the USET Tribal ancestors used these sacred landscapes to sustain the people's reliance on Mother Earth and the spirit energies of balance and harmony"

"whether these stone structures are massive or small structures, stacked, stone rows, or effigies, these prayers in stone are often mistaken by archaeologists and State Historic Preservation Officers (SHPOs) as the efforts of farmers clearing stones for agricultural or wall building purposes"

The resolution goes on to request that the federal government work to understand and preserve the stone landscapes.

== Features ==
Ceremonial stone landscapes vary in their form, location, and orientation, though they are geographically most common in the northeastern United States. Optically stimulated luminescence dating suggests that these sites were often utilized across multiple centuries, and were expanded or changed throughout their period of use.

Common features of ceremonial stone landscapes include cairns, standing stones (often called "manitou stones"), effigies (often in the form of serpents or turtles), and stone chambers. These sites are commonly located in upland areas close to sources of water.

== Controversies ==
Ceremonial stone landscapes are an emerging area of research in the fields of archaeology and anthropology, and the concept of ceremonial stone landscapes remain controversial within these disciplines. The Massachusetts Historical Commission does not recognize pre-contact stoneworks within the state. The former principle archaeologist of the Rhode Island Historical Preservation and Heritage Commission, Dr. Timothy Ives, is a prominent skeptic of ceremonial stone landscapes. Dr. Ives refers to the concept as "academic archeology gone woke", and attributing ceremonial stone landscape sites to agrarian stone-heaping and wall building practices in the post-contact period.

However, there has been increased interest in ceremonial stone landscapes among some tribal organizations, archeologists, and historic preservation groups. Optically stimulated luminescence of multiple ceremonial stone landscape sites, including the Pratt Hill site in Massachusetts and Oley Hills site in Pennsylvania, has yielded evidence of these sites dating from the Woodland Period rather than the post-contact period.

Much of the initial archeological work regarding ceremonial stone landscapes was carried out by amateurs and hobbyists rather than professional archaeologists. During the 19th century, many of the amateur researchers interested in ceremonial stone landscape sites erroneously attributed them to Irish explorers arriving in eastern North America during the pre-contact period; these misguided theories continue to attract some attention outside of serious academic circles.

== See Also ==
- Oley Hills site
- Gungywamp
- Pratt Hill-Upton Chamber District
