= Harrat Khaybar =

Volcanic field in the Hejaz, Saudi Arabia

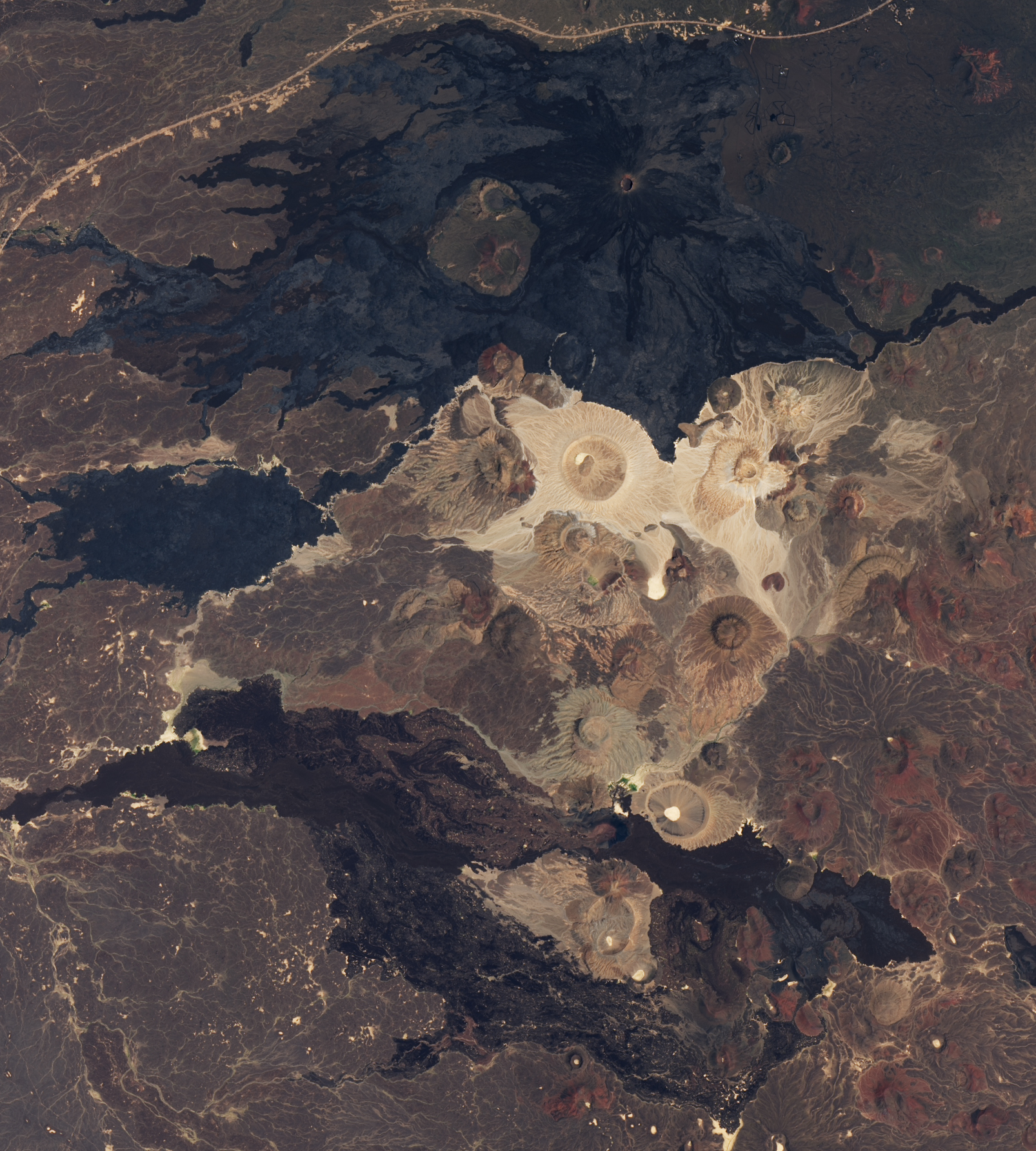

Highest point
- Elevation: 2,093 m (6,867 ft)
- Coordinates: 25°43′10″N 39°56′34″E

Naming
- Native name: حرة خيبر (Arabic)

Geography
- Location within Saudi Arabia
- Location: Medina, Saudi Arabia

Geology
- Mountain type: Volcanic field
- Last eruption: 650 CE ± 50 years

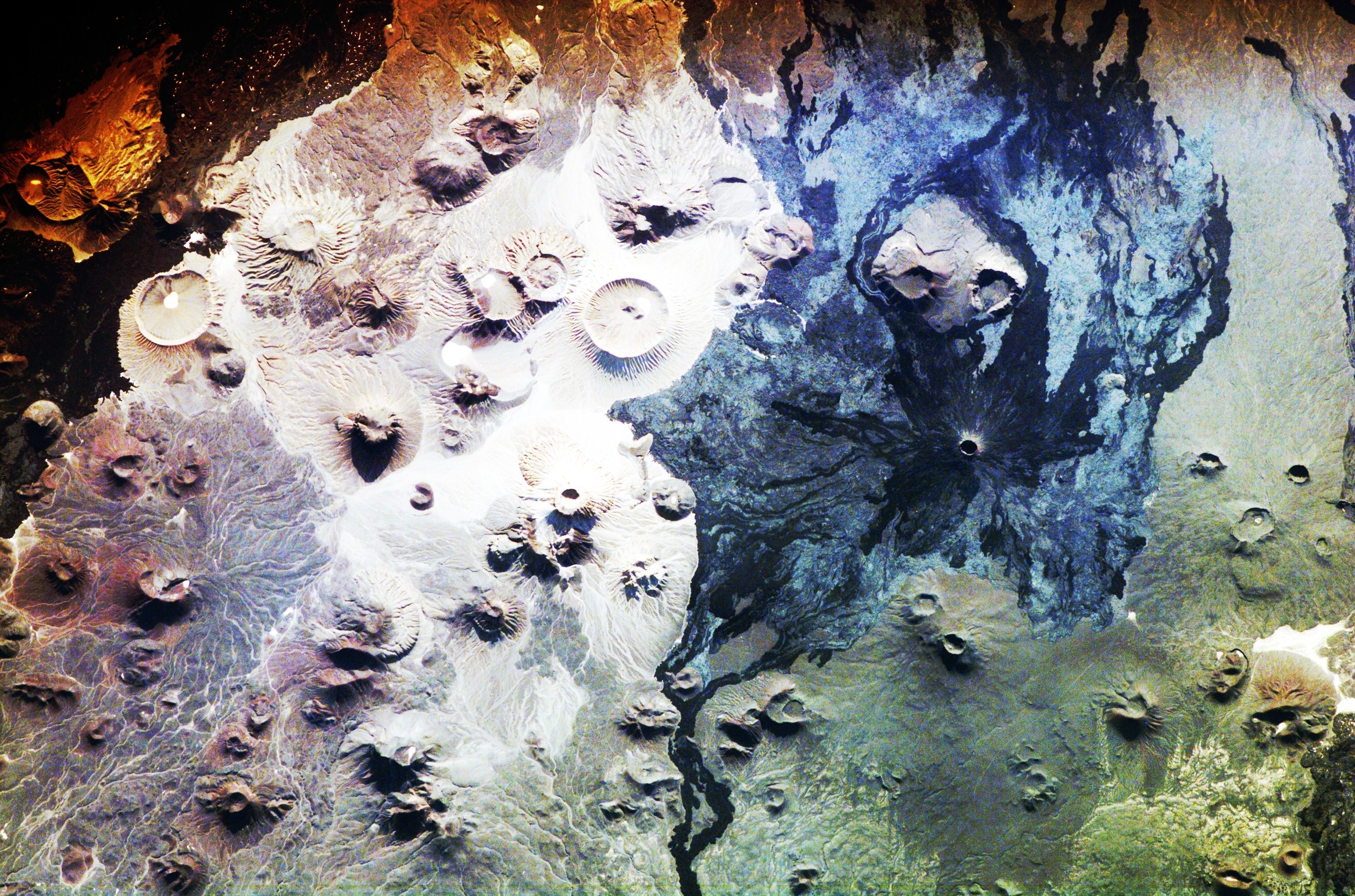
Harrat Khaybar seen from the International Space Station (North to the right of the picture)

Ḥarrat Khaybar (Arabic: حَرَّة خَيْبَر) is a volcanic field located north of Medina in the Hejaz, Saudi Arabia. It covers an area approximately 12,000 km^{2} (4,600 sq mi). The most recent eruption occurred between 600 and 700 AD. Man-made stone structures dating to the Neolithic period have been studied in Harrat Khaybar.

== Geography ==
The basaltic lava fields of Harrat Khaybar were formed by a series of eruptions over the course of 5 million years. These eruptions took place along a series of volcanic vents stretching over a 100-kilometer (62 mile) north-south linear vent system. The fields cover an area of approximately 12,000 km^{2}. The most recent volcanic eruption took place between 600 and 700 AD.

The White Mountains of Harrat Khaybar, Jabal Abyad and Jabal Bayda, derive their light appearance from comendite. Jabal Abyad, at an elevation of 2,093 metres (6,867 ft), is the tallest volcano in Saudi Arabia. These mountains contrast with the darker appearance of the hawaiite lava flows and domes which dominate the lava fields, such as Jabal Qidr.

=== IUGS geological heritage site ===
In respect of it being 'the largest historic basaltic volcanic cone in intracontinental settings within a Pleistocene rhyolitic tuff ring and lava dome field', the International Union of Geological Sciences (IUGS) included 'The historic scoria cone of the Jabal Qidr' in its assemblage of 100 'geological heritage sites' around the world in a listing published in October 2022. The organisation defines an IUGS Geological Heritage Site as 'a key place with geological elements and/or processes of international scientific relevance, used as a reference, and/or with a substantial contribution to the development of geological sciences through history.'

== Human activity ==
Evidence of early human habitation has been found in the lava fields of Harrat Khaybar. The remains of Neolithic human communities have been studied there, including habitations, fences, and funerary structures built out of volcanic stones. The structures are believed to have been constructed by pastoral tribes who lived in the area. Similar Neolithic structures have been studied throughout Arabia, Syria, and Jordan, and are collectively referred to as "The Works of the Old Men". These structures were first observed by Royal Air Force pilots in the 1920s, although they did not gain much academic or media attention at the time. The Neolithic inhabitants also mined the volcanic field for obsidian

Sandstone mustatils associated with early cattle cults have also been studied in Harrat Khaybar. Because the uneven lava plains are poorly suited to the construction of mustatils, many were built resting against volcanic vents. Pendant shaped tower tombs or cairns in Harrat Khaybar have been dated back to the third millennium BCE.

Similar funerary structures dating to the Middle Holocene are found within a range spanning across northwestern Arabia, although a particularly high density have been found in Harrat Khaybar. These groupings of structures are associated with the oases along the fringes of Harrat Khaybar. Keyhole and trumpet tombs, tomb structures not found elsewhere, have also been discovered in Harrat Khaybar.

Researchers have studied hundreds of large stone structures nicknamed "desert kites" and "gates", but their exact purpose and function is still unknown. The gates of Harrat Khaybar are so named because they resemble horizontally laid barred gates. This type of structure is rarely attested to outside of Harrat Khaybar. The largest of the gates measure over 304 metres (1,000 ft) in length and 75 metres (250 ft) in width.

It has been theorized that desert kites may have been used to trap and hunt wild animals. In particular, it has been theorized that they were used to corral herds of gazelles. The kites found in Harrat Khaybar are similar to other stone structures found in neighboring Syria and Jordan. However, many of the kites of Harrat Khaybar are built in a different shape than those found elsewhere.

In 2004, neurologist Abdullah al-Saeed first began studying the structures in the lava fields and found them to be unimpressive, but reassessed their importance after reexamination of the area by the use of Google Earth. According to al-Saeed, he and his team did not observe the pattern and importance of the structures until observing them from an aerial viewpoint.

Al-Saeed and his team later collaborated with British archaeologist David L. Kennedy, who had used aerial archaeology to study similar structures in Jordan, but had not been allowed to cross the border into Saudi Arabia. According to Kennedy, the structures in the Harrat Khaybar were created between 2,000 and 9,000 years earlier than those in Jordan. As of 2017, the team of researchers had reportedly discovered more than 900 kites in Harrat Khaybar.

== Umm Jirsan lava tube ==
Within the lava field is the Umm Jirsan lava tube, with a length of 1,481 metres (4,859 ft) in three sections including two pieces of collapsed roof. It is Saudi Arabia's longest lava tube system. In August 2021, the analysis of many thousands of animal and human bones from the cave system revealed that striped hyenas (Hyaena hyaena) had used this as a den for around 7,000 years.

== See also ==
- List of volcanoes in Saudi Arabia
- List of volcanic fields
- Khaybar
- Sarat Mountains
  - Hijaz Mountains

== Sources ==
- "Harrat Khaybar". Global Volcanism Program. Smithsonian Institution.
- "Harrat Khaybar". NASA.
