= Pratt Hill-Upton Chamber District =

Archaeological site in Upton, Massachusetts, US

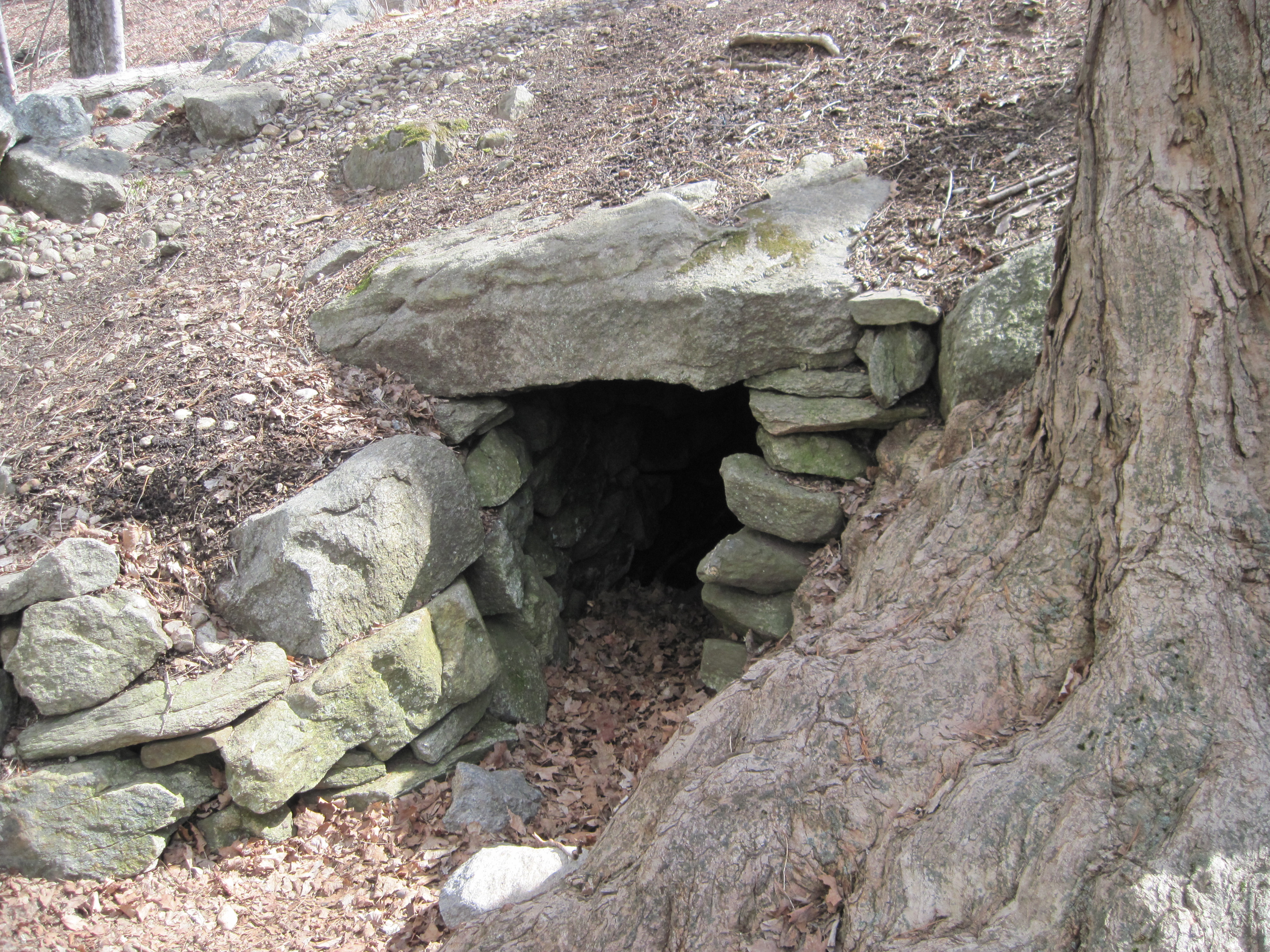
Entry to Upton Chamber

The Pratt Hill-Upton Chamber District is a ceremonial stone landscape located in Upton, Massachusetts, United States. The site is considered eligible for listing on the National Register of Historic Places due to its cultural and religious significance to the American Indian tribes of the region.

== Description ==
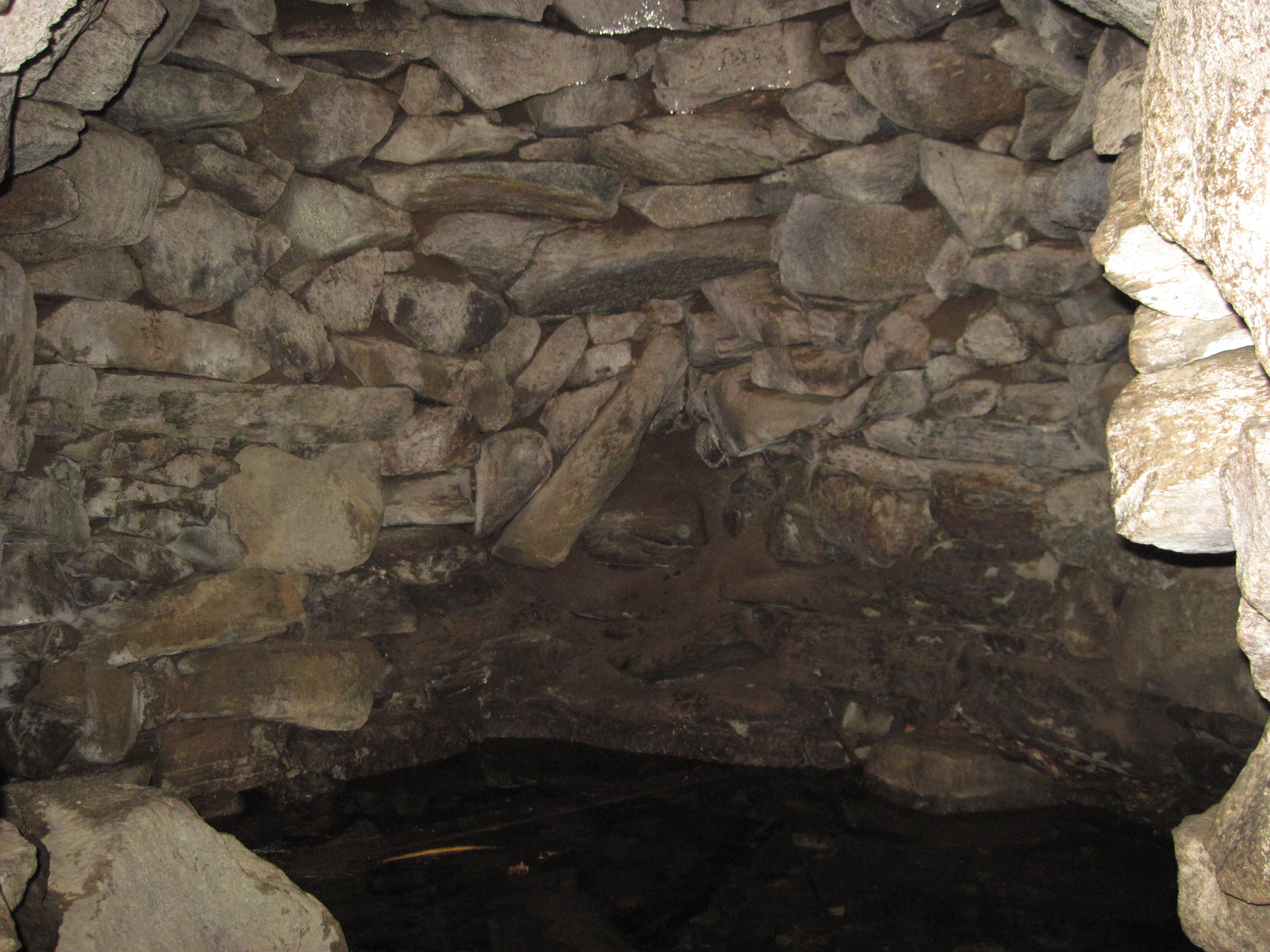
Interior of Upton Chamber.

The Pratt Hill-Upton Chamber District is a discontinuous historic district, consisting of a stone chamber in Upton's Heritage Park, to the south of Pratt Pond, and a series of stoneworks (primarily stone piles) on nearby Pratt Hill, largely concentrated along the crest of the hill.

The stone chamber, known as Upton Chamber is a beehive-shaped stone chamber made of non-quarried stone. The chamber is buried within a hillside at 42°10′33.05″N 71°35′52.26″W. Its interior measures 11 feet 3 inches (3.43 m) across at its base. The ceiling of the chamber is 10 feet 5 inches (3.18 m) in height. A narrow passage, measuring 3 feet (0.91 m) wide at the entryway, narrowing to 2 feet 6 inches (0.76 m) before opening up to the beehive chamber. The passageway is 4 feet 6 inches (1.37 m) in height, and 14 feet 3 inches (4.34 m) in length, connects the chamber to the exterior entry.

== History ==
=== Context of the historic site: Upton area history ===
==== Precolonial history ====
Current archeological evidence has not yielded any sites predating the late Archaic period within 3km (1.86 miles) of Upton Chamber.

The late Archaic period saw a dramatic decrease in hemlock within the forests of southern New England. This led to a diversification in tree species within the region, which had previously been dominated by hemlock forests. Hickory, oak, American chestnut, and white pine proliferated, providing food for both people and game animals. As food sources grew more abundant, the population of this region saw a significant increase.

During the Late Archaic and Woodland periods in present-day Massachusetts, settlement patterns typically centered around bodies of water and drainage areas, with the uplands between rivers being a common location for settlements. Semi-permanent villages would often serve as a sort of base camp for native communities, but it was typical for these communities to move to temporary villages throughout the year to take advantage of seasonal food sources, such as fish runs in the springtime or deer hunting camps in winter.

The Woodland period saw further changes in indigenous societies of present-day Massachusetts. Settlement patterns became more sedentary, though settlements continued to be based largely around water sources. Evidence of increased trade is present; exotic materials (such as copper, red ocher, and non-local chert) begin to emerge in the archeological record.

Archeological remains of four late Archaic settlements are present in the area of Pratt Hill and Pratt Pond, with two of these sites showing ongoing use through the Woodland period.

In its early history, the area around present-day Upton was inhabited by Algonquin peoples. By the mid-to-late Woodland period, Nipmuc people were the primary inhabitants of the Upton area.

Well-used trails are noted to have crossed through the Pratt Hill and Pratt Pond area during the precolonial era. These pathways include the Old Connecticut Path; a major trail connecting what is present-day Boston to the Connecticut River; as well as more regional routes connecting Nipmuc villages located in what is present-day Grafton and Uxbridge. Archeological evidence suggests that this region of present-day Massachusetts sustained a relatively dense population during the late Archaic and Woodland periods, with the population peaking shortly before European contact. The area around Pratt Pond was likely utilized as seasonal fishing, hunting, and gathering grounds by the local people during this era.

==== Post-colonization ====
Following European contact, local indigenous populations declined significantly, due to disease, war, and social upheaval. During this era, the area around Pratt Hill and Pratt Pond continued to serve as an important site for Nipmuc communities. This area was not used as a year-round permanent settlement, but instead was used seasonally for fishing and agriculture.

Following Metacom's Rebellion, European settlers began encroaching on the Nipmuc lands near present-day Upton. European colonists began to settle in present-day Upton during the early 18th century. Initial European settlement consisted of dispersed farmsteads, though by the 18th century a population center emerged near Pratt Pond.

=== Upton Chamber ===
==== 19th and 20th centuries ====
The property around the chamber was operated as a tannery by a Mr. John Hill during the mid-1800s; the tannery was disused by 1879. It changed hands several times before being purchased by Charles M. Pearson in 1928. Photographer Malcolm Pearson grew up on the property, and contributed images of the chamber to William Goodwin's 1946 book, The Ruins of Great Ireland in New England, which erroneously proposed that the site was built by precolonial Irish explorers.

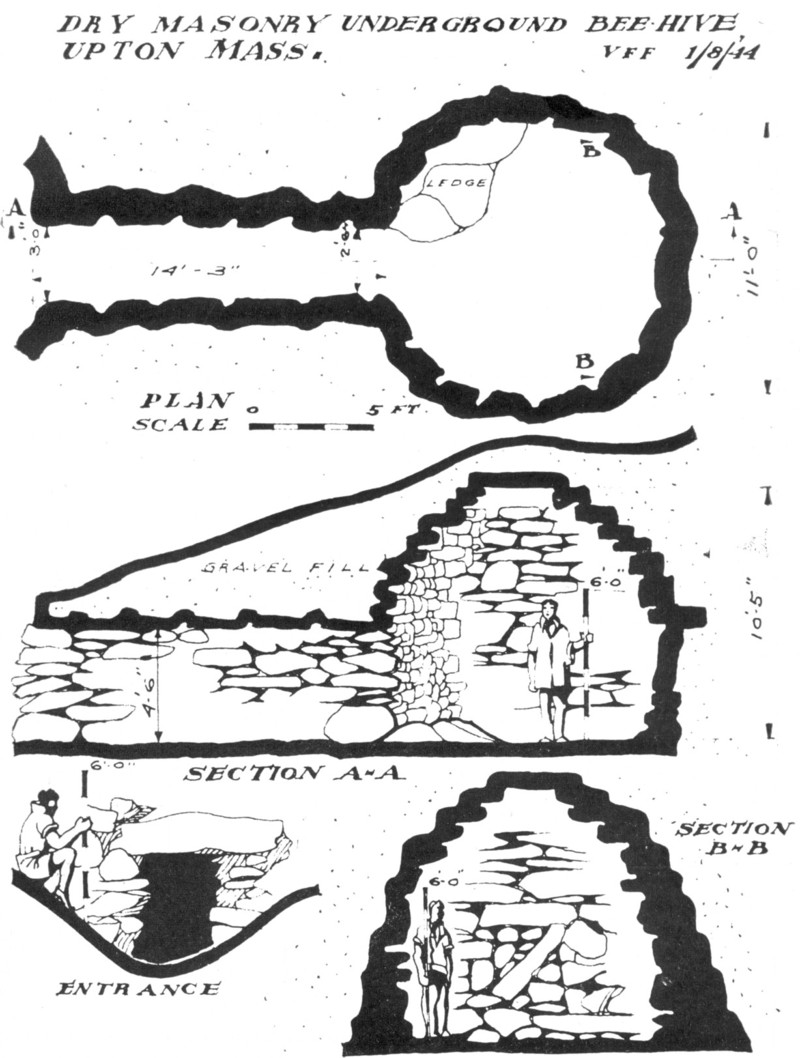
Diagram of Upton Stone Chamber

==== Speculation and excavation ====
Interest in the Upton Stone Chamber as a curiosity arose beginning around 1893, with various theories arising about its origins and usage. One popular theory was proposed by William Goodwin in 1946, which theorized that the site had been built by early Irish explorers in the region, noting similarities to Irish stone structures of the 12th century. However, Goodwin's claims do not align with any substantiated archeological evidence related to the site. Additional speculative uses include a colonial era root cellar or icehouse; or as a place of refuge for native peoples or colonists during conflicts of the 17th and 18th century.

In 1955, archaeologists John Glass and David H. Kelly excavated the entrance passage, half the interior of the chamber, and some of the area in front of its entrance. During the excavation, a wooden floor, corroded nails, and a ceramic fragment were uncovered, suggesting usage of the chamber during the post colonization period. In 2011, another excavation was undertaken in conjunction with restoration work at the site. The interior of the chamber did not yield any undisturbed soil strata; materials dating from the 19th and 20th century were present, such as pottery shards, glass, and tar paper.

Optically stimulated luminescence (OSL) dating indicates that the site was constructed sometime between 1350 C.E. and 1625 C.E., predating European colonial settlement in the area. However, debate on the chamber's origin persists. Thus far no material evidence from the pre-contact period have been uncovered within Upton Chamber.

==== Restoration and preservation ====
In 2008, plans for Upton Heritage Park were approved by the town of Upton. The park's plans called for the preservation of Upton Chamber and its use as an interpretive site. Plans for the park were drafted by landscape designer Elizabeth Morrison, working as part of the nonprofit Community Outreach Group for Landscape Design. The plans for the park include walking trails, gathering areas/picnic areas, a wildlife viewing deck, a stone dock on the millpond, and a mixture of woodland and meadows, with plantings within the park consisting of plant species native to the area. The park was opened on April 15, 2012.

In 2011, restoration work was undertaken at the site due to damage to the stonework and ongoing concerns about the chamber flooding. Damage included gaps in the stonework, encroaching tree roots, and the lintel above the entryway becoming dislodged from the structure. The damage was largely attributed to climate factors (notably the freeze-thaw cycle), and damage by tree roots. Restoration work involved using dislodged stones from the chamber's floor to repack the gaps in the walls. The chamber floor was excavated to its original level, and angled to allow for improved water drainage from the chamber.

=== Pratt Hill ===
In 2018 the United States Geological Survey took two OSL samples at the base of a damaged Pratt Hill stone structure. The upper sample gave an age of 1375–1475 C.E. and the lower one 1835–1315 B.C.E.

In the 2010s, a landowner on Pratt Hill sought to build a cell phone tower on the land; this caught the attention of preservationists, leading to investigation into the stoneworks of Pratt Hill and their relationship to the Upton Chamber. Pratt Hill was surveyed by members of local historic preservation groups and tribal preservation officers, and the stoneworks of Pratt Hill were determined to be indigenous in origin and had a likely relationship with the Upton Stone Chamber. In 2011, the Tribal Historic Preservation Officers of the Wampanoag Tribe of Gay Head (Aquinnah), the Narragansett Tribe, and Mashpee Wampanoag Tribe successfully petitioned the Federal Communications Commission to consider the site eligible for listing on the National Register of Historic Places. However, prior to earning this designation, the landowner bulldozed several of the smaller Pratt Hill stoneworks. Following the National Register of Historic Places eligibility, the cell tower was moved elsewhere. The Narragansett Nation purchased much of the land on Pratt Hill to ensure the preservation of the indigenous stoneworks.

== See also ==
- Nashoba Brook Stone Chamber
- Oley Hills Site
- Ceremonial Stone Landscape
