= Amos R. Green =

American farmer (1887–1968)

- Born: 1887
- Died: 1968 (aged 80–81)
- Occupation: Farmer

Amos R. Green (1887–1968) was an American farmer near Niles, Michigan and an amateur anthropologist and archaeologist. He was also a leader in the Michigan Archeological Society, through which he met and collaborated with professional and academic anthropologists. Despite his lack of formal training, Green presented his work and published articles related to his discoveries.

== Biography ==
Amos Green spent the majority of his life earning a living through farming, but spent a significant amount of time pursuing his personal interest in anthropology, archaeology, and local history.

He earned a high school degree and participated in military service in WWI. Despite his early interest in anthropology, he worked various jobs as a portrait photographer, auto mechanic, and lumberjack, living most of his life in Berrien County, Michigan.

Green died from injuries incurred in a car accident on July 18, 1968. He was 81.

== Archeological work ==
Later in life, Green worked to re-start the Michigan Archeological Society, a group that aimed to bring amateur archaeologists and professionals together. The group successfully reformed in 1950, serving as the group's Southwest Chapter president for 8 years. He was also a member of the MAS executive board. Green developed relationships with professional anthropologists and archaeologists and wrote letters with them regularly, sharing information about their work.

Green presented his work to various groups over the years in an effort to increase enthusiasm for studying local history, including a presentation on "A Framework of State and Local History" at the Eastern States Archeological Federation meeting in 1966.

Green also published articles about his work, including:

- Green, Amos. "The Bevel in Stone and Steel Tools," Papers of the Michigan Academy of Science, Arts, & Letters, Vol. 32, Page 53 of 68.
- Green, Amos. "Paleo Indian and Mammoth were Contemporaneous in Berrien County, MI." The Michigan Archaeologist, Vol. 13, March 1967.

Green also had a passion for bringing historical and anthropological information to his fellow non-academics, and regularly participated in radio and newspaper interviews for public audiences.

== Archives ==
An archival collection documenting Green's life and work is available at the Bentley Historical Library at the University of Michigan. These records illustrate Green's research as well as presentations to the public and professional organizations. Though Green collected a variety of artifacts from his field work, no artifacts are present in the collection.
