= Ritual landscape =

Concept in archaeology

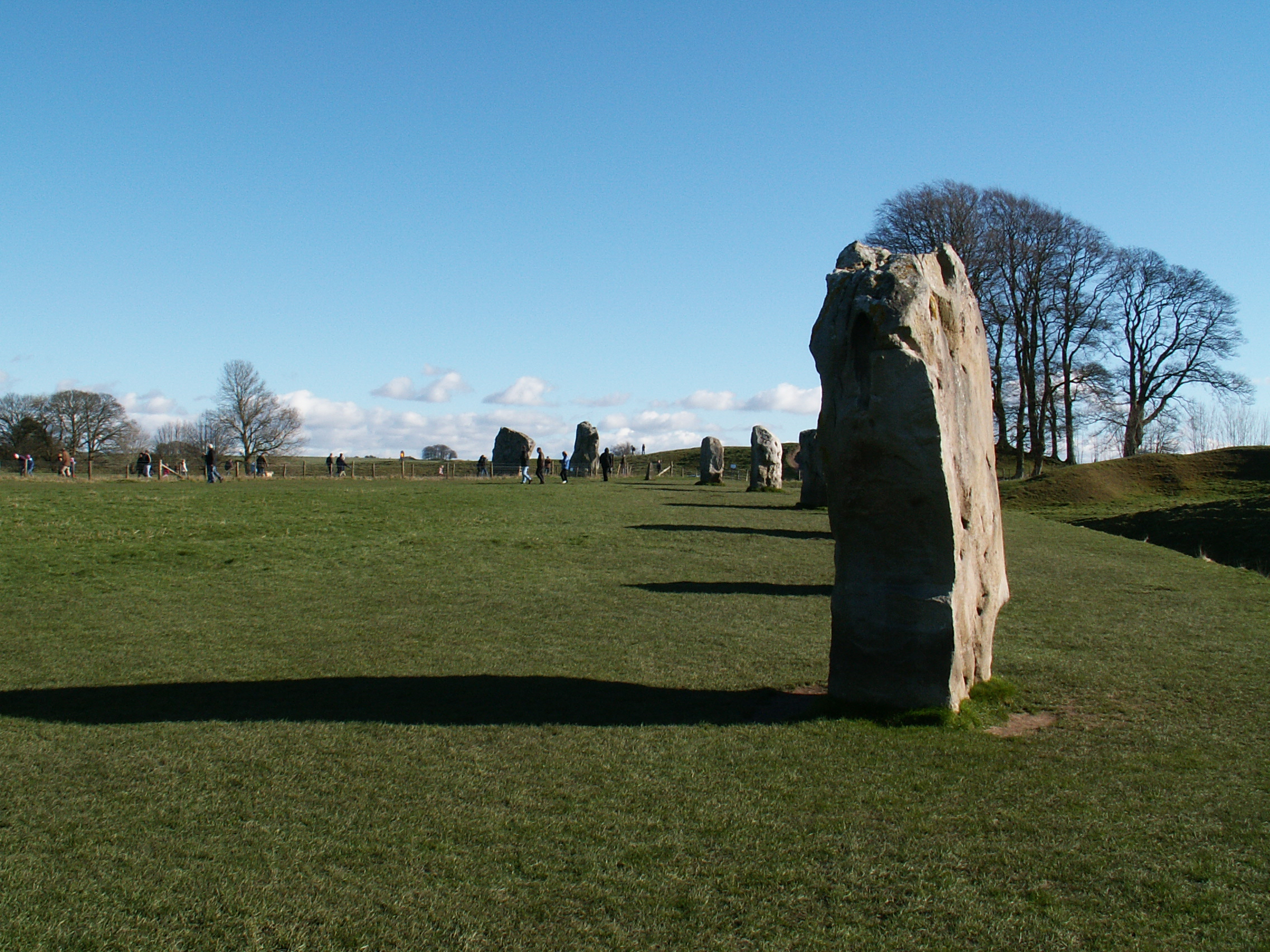
Avebury Stone Circle in Great Britain

Ritual landscapes or ceremonial landscapes are large archaeological areas that were seemingly dedicated to ceremonial purposes in the Neolithic and Bronze Ages. Most are dated to around 3500–1800 BC, though a mustatil in Arabia has been dated to between 5300 and 5000 BC. The term emerged in the early 1980s in British archaeology and was contrasted with more conventional studies of monument sites concerned with dating, classification, and political divisions. Ritual landscapes are often associated with origin myths, ancestors, homes of spiritual essences, or locales where mythical or historical events occurred while the landscape features include social memory and the preservation of the myths, histories, trusts, and the belongings of a people. Aside from a place of origin and mythology, ritual landscapes were also considered places of protection and renewal.

== Features ==
=== In Britain and Ireland ===
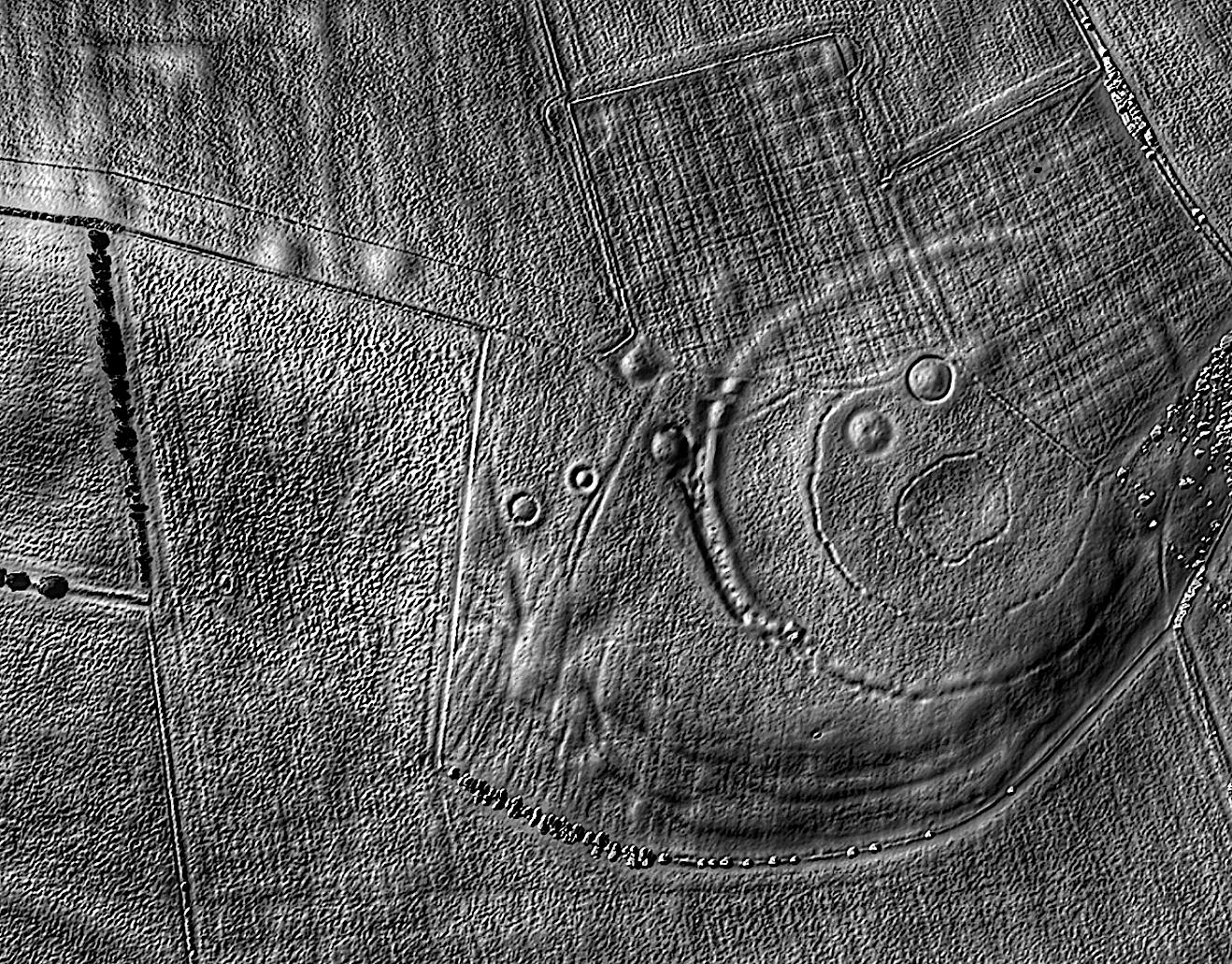
A lidar view of Windmill Hill Neolithic causewayed enclosure etc near Avebury in Wiltshire

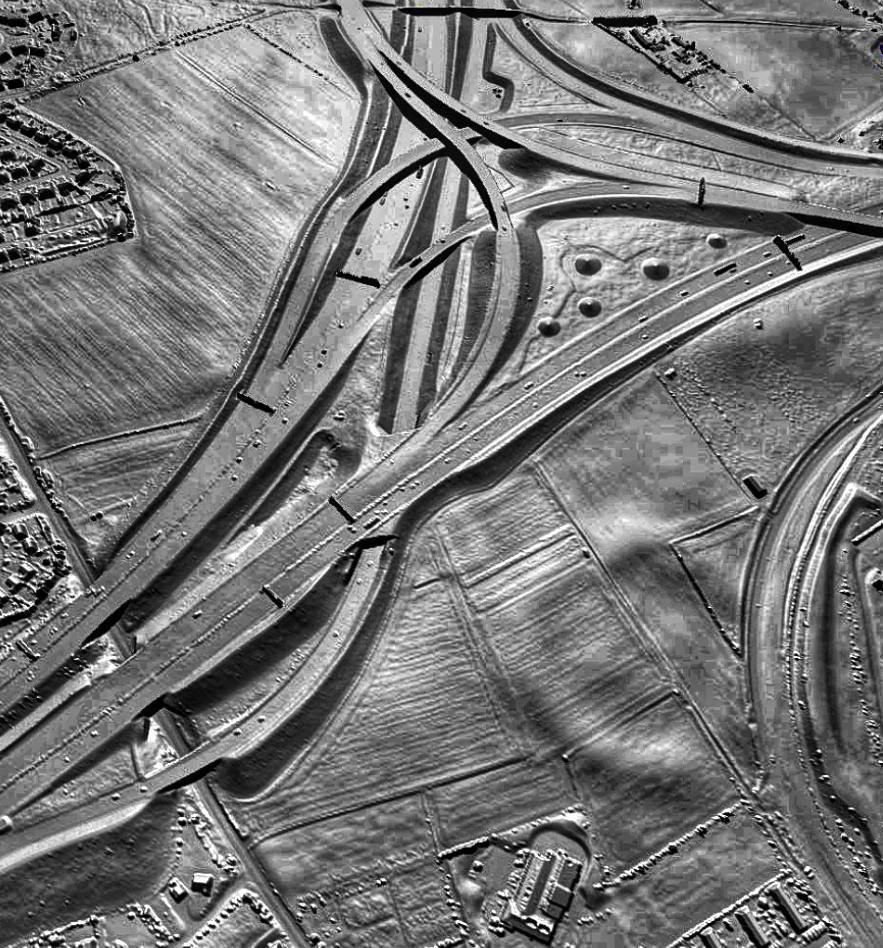
A lidar view of Ferrybridge Henge in West Yorkshire. A total of 22 ritual monuments have now been identified within 500m of the henge, including nine barrows, five ‘henge-type’ enclosures, two long barrows, two pit circles and two timber circles (HER).

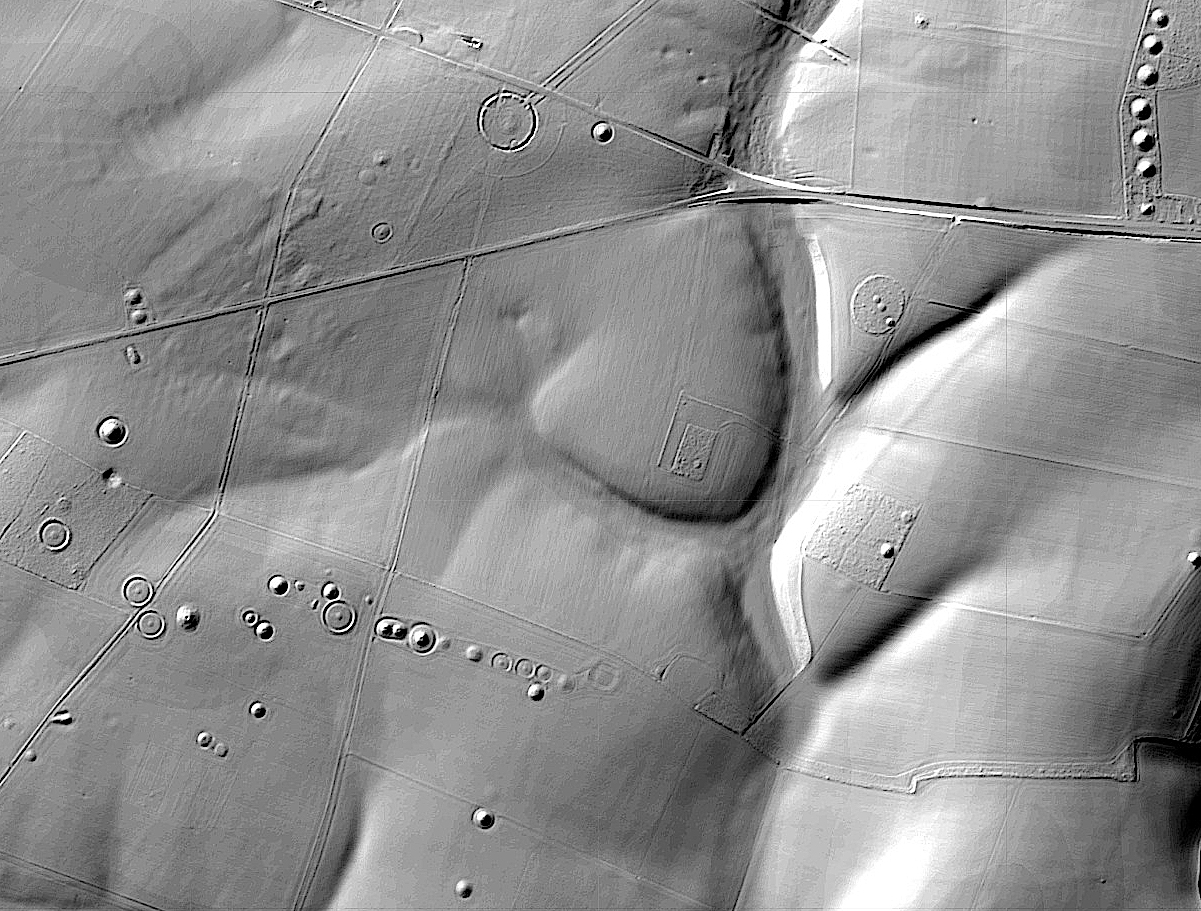
A lidar view of the landscape south of Stonehenge (top left of centre)

In Britain, many ritual landscapes were gradually built around the two earliest classes of Neolithic communal monuments: long barrows and causewayed enclosures. For instance, the Avebury ritual site featured a giant, flat-topped barrow called Silbury Hill, which is considered the largest artificial mound in prehistoric Europe. The evidence of contemporary settlement within these landscapes is often sparse or absent altogether; conversely, non-utilitarian structures and artifacts are typically abundant. The Ring of Brodgar, part of the Heart of Neolithic Orkney, as the World Heritage Site on Orkney, Scotland is called, is the other most famous site in Britain.

Ritual landscapes in Ireland—such as Brú na Bóinne (another WHS), Tara and Uisneach—include ancient tombs, stone circles, standing stones, enclosures, avenues, and natural features.

In Britain and Ireland, ritual landscapes went out of use relatively abruptly around 1500 BC and were replaced by smaller-scale shrines, which were often located near rivers, marshes, and springs. These smaller shrines usually feature offerings of food and metalwork and continued to be created and used into Roman and even Saxon times. Today they are often described as Celtic.

=== In other cultures ===
In other cultures, the ritual landscape is strongly influenced by the environment. This is demonstrated in the case of Tibet, the verticality of the environment dominated the constructions of the ritual landscape and features therein such as structures and tombs, which were built to resemble the mountains.

== See also ==
- cursus
- Nasca Lines - South America
- Ceremonial stone landscape - North America
- Newark Earthworks - North America
- Mount Tlaloc - Mesoamerica
