= Archaeological Society of Delaware =

Archaeological society made to study ancient delaware

Archaeological Society of Delaware

The Archaeological Society of Delaware is an archaeological society founded in 1933 to study the archaeology of Delaware in the United States and the surrounding region. It is a member of the Eastern States Archeological Federation. It publishes an annual scholarly journal, the Bulletin, past copies of which are available without subscription on the society's website.
