= Robbins Museum =

Archaeological museum in Massachusetts, US

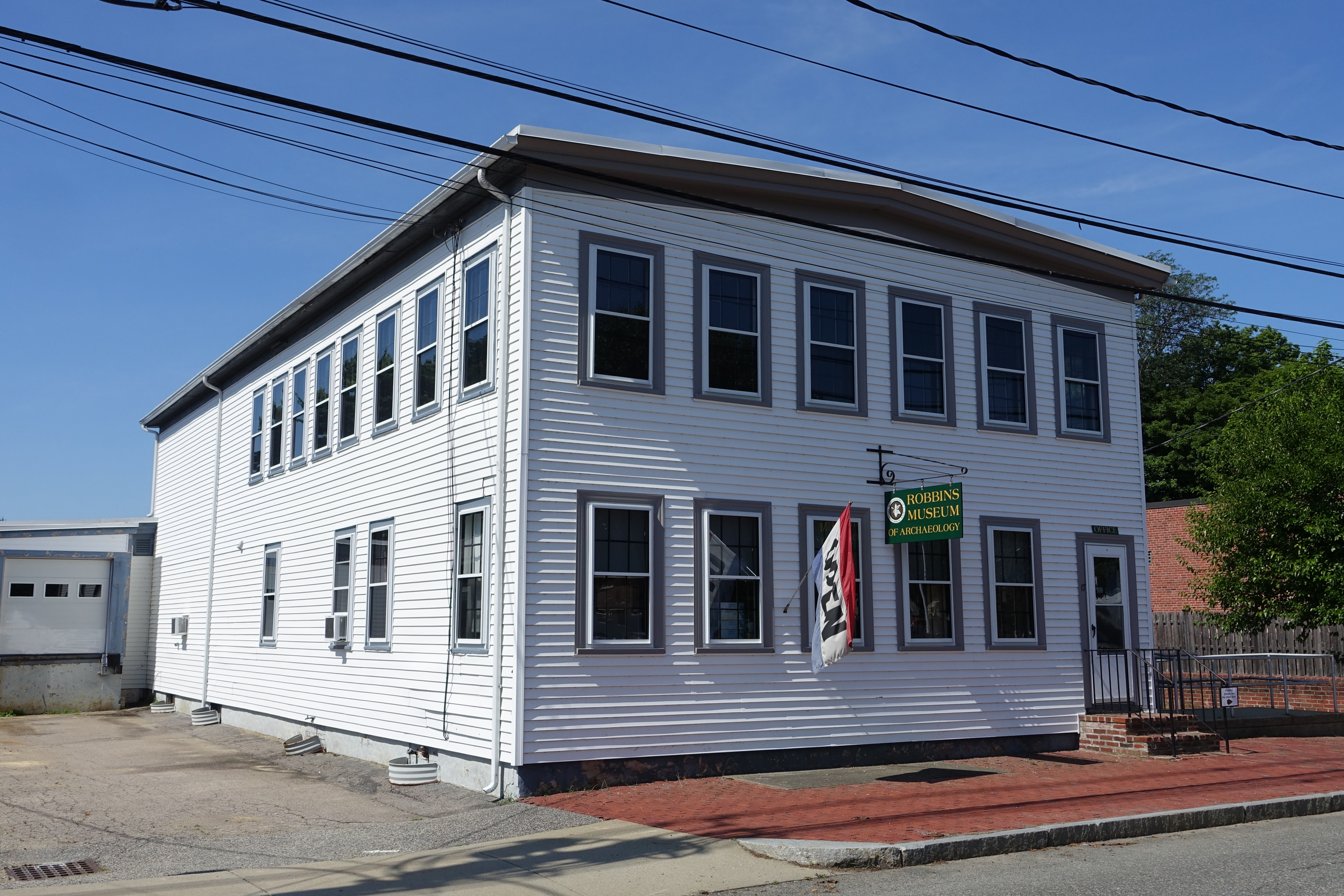
- Established: 1988
- Location: 17 Jackson Street; Middleborough, Massachusetts
- Coordinates: 41.8927°N 70.9070°W
- Type: Archaeology
- Owner: Massachusetts Archaeological Society
- Website: massarchaeology.org/robbins-museum/about

The Robbins Museum, also known as the Robbins Museum of Archaeology, is an archaeological museum operated by the Massachusetts Archaeological Society (MAS). It is located at 17 Jackson Street, Middleborough, Massachusetts, US.

The collection numbers approximately 150,000 artifacts. The museum contains a gallery, lecture hall, library, gift shop, and 4,550 square feet of exhibit spaces displaying over 3,000 artifacts. There are many artifacts and displays about Native Americans in New England, including a timeline, a diorama of a 4,300 year old village, Native American dolls, a handcrafted mishoon (dugout canoe), and portraits.

== History ==
Prior to the Robbins Museum, the Society maintained its collection at the Bronson Museum in Attleboro, Massachusetts, which proved too small as its collection, of over 90,000 artifacts, continued to grow. The Robbins Museum dates to 1988, when the existing Robertson Factory building was renovated to accommodate the museum complex and named in honor of Dr. Maurice Robbins, the MAS founder.
