= Massachusetts Archaeological Society =

Massachusetts Archaeological Society logo

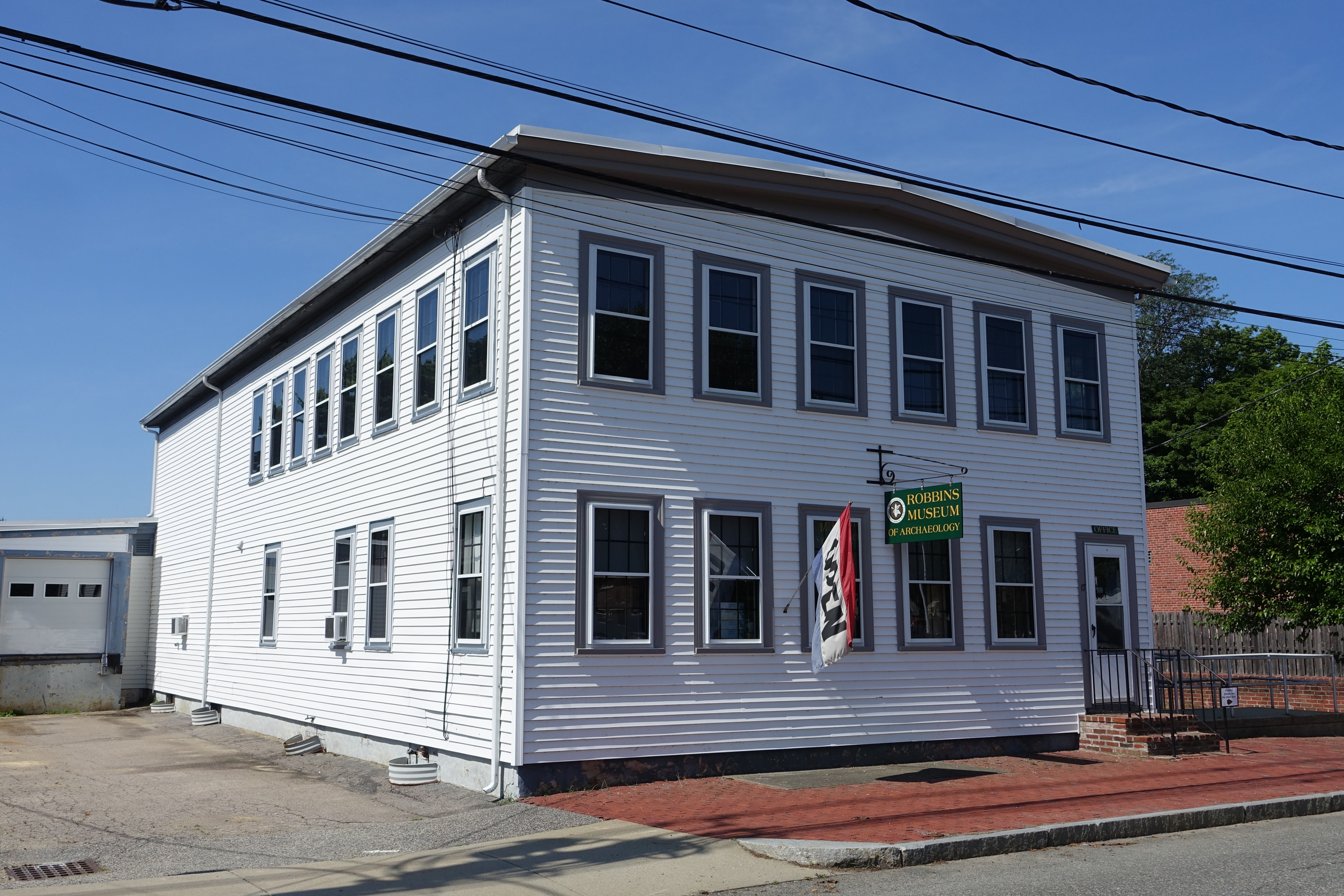
Robbins Museum

The Massachusetts Archaeological Society is an archaeological society based at the Robbins Museum, which it also runs, at Middleborough, Massachusetts. It publishes a scholarly journal, the Bulletin of the Massachusetts Archaeological Society, and is a member of the Eastern States Archeological Federation.
