= Eastern States Archeological Federation =

American archeological society

Eastern States Archeological Federation logo

The Eastern States Archeological Federation is an archaeological society that was founded in 1933. Its member societies represent the Eastern United States and Canada. It has published a Bulletin since 1941 and an annual journal, Archaeology of Eastern North America, since 1973.

The member societies are:

- Archaeological Society of Connecticut
- Archaeological Society of Delaware
- Archaeological Society of New Jersey
- Maryland Archaeological Society
- Maine Archaeological Society
- Massachusetts Archaeological Society
- New Hampshire Archaeological Society
- New York State Archaeological Association
- Ohio Archaeological Council
- Society for Pennsylvania Archaeology
- Vermont Archaeological Society
- Archeological Society of Virginia
- West Virginia Archaeological Society
