= Oley Hills site =

Enigmatic complex of stone walls in Pennsylvania, US

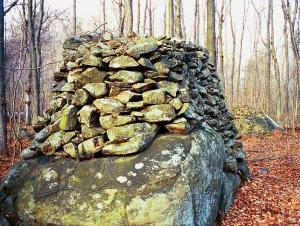
Shaped rock piles on boulders at the Oley Hills site

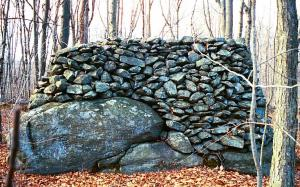
Large shaped rock pile at the Oley Hills site

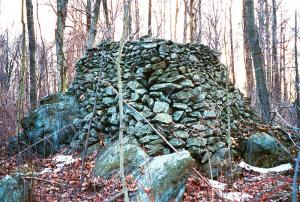
Cairn or rock pile at the Oley Hills site: sometimes said to resemble a turtle

The Oley Hills site, or Oley Hills stone work site, located in Berks County, Pennsylvania, is an enigmatic complex of snaking dry stone walls, carefully shaped rock piles or cairns, perched boulders, and unusually shaped natural boulders. It is possible to see animal and human forms in some of the rock piles and boulders, but whether those images were intended by the builders or are phenomena of the imaginations of modern observers has not been demonstrated. The site boasts other features such as an enormous "split-wedged boulder," a split boulder with another stone wedged into the split.

A luminescence analysis of the site suggests the cairns were erected around 570 BC, possibly by the Adena culture, which was centered in the Ohio River Valley. The complex is large and elaborate, at 46 acres (19 ha) in the central site alone, with many outliers along the ridge, as shown by the work of Norman Muller, conservator of the Princeton University Art Museum, who argued it was thus unlikely to have been the product of a field clearing operation. Muller argued instead that the site was the product of Native American ceremonial practices. It may be an example of the ceremonial stone landscapes described by USET, United Southern and Eastern Tribes, Inc. in their resolution on the topic.
