= Mustatil =

Rectangular prehistoric sandstone monuments in northwest Saudi Arabia

Mustatils
- Map of Saudi Arabia showing the location of the mustatils
- 25°52′54″N 39°23′38″E
- Type: Monument
- Location: northwest Saudi Arabia

History
- Built: Neolithic

Site notes
- Material: sandstone
- Height: 1.2 metres (3 ft 11 in) high
- Length: 20–600 metres (66–1,969 ft) long

Mustatils are monuments from Prehistoric Arabia, made of sandstone walls, found in northwestern region of modern-day Saudi Arabia.

== Location, prevalence, and layout ==
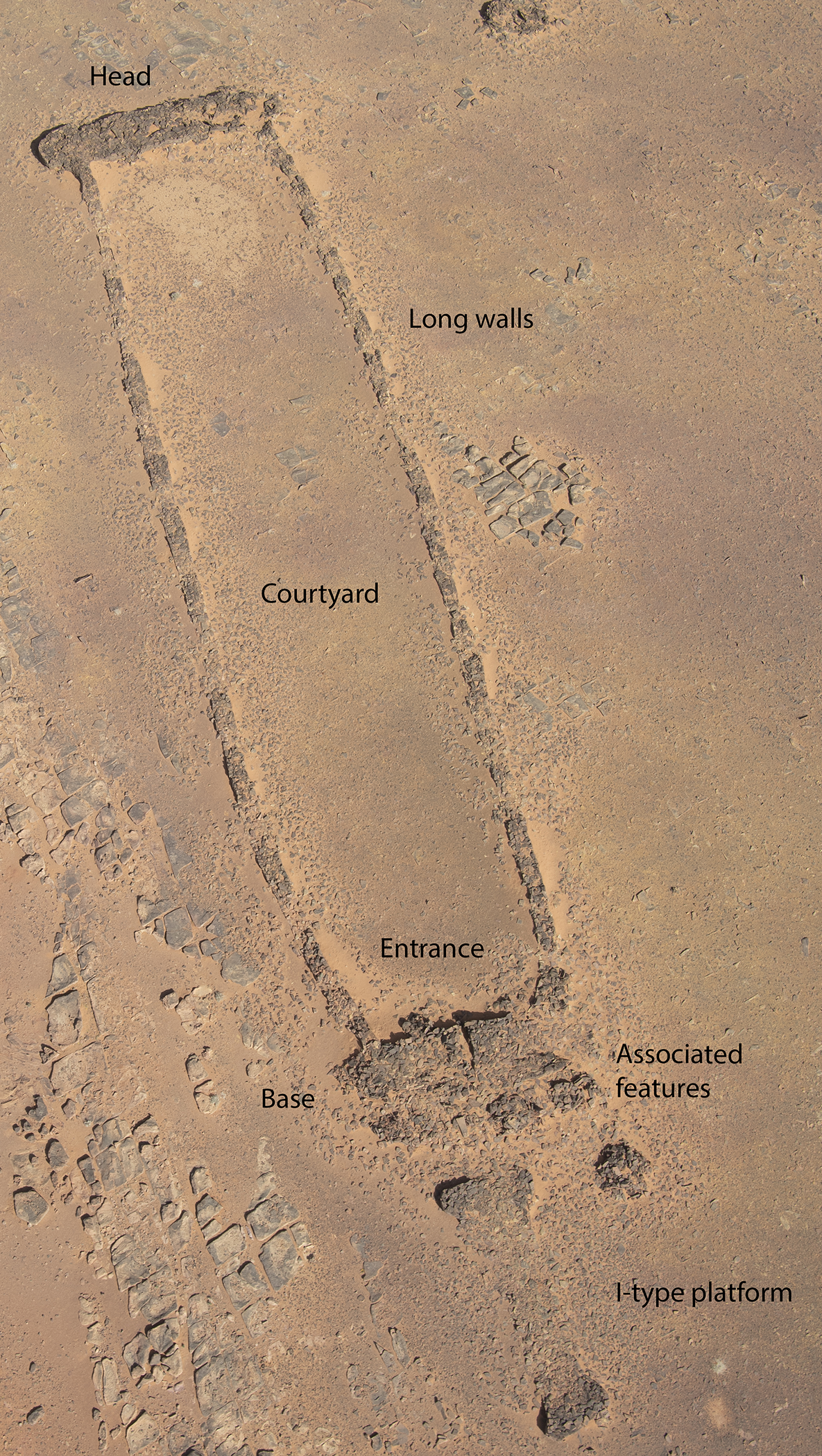
The architectural layout of a typical mustatil.

Named mustatil (Arabic: مستطيل, lit. 'rectangle', plural مُسْتَطِيلَات, mustaṭīlāt) for their shape, they have walls surrounding a long central courtyard, with a rubble platform at one end and entrances at the end opposite the platform. Some entrances are closed off with stones.

Over 1,000 mustatils, clustered in groups of 2–19, are spread out across a ritual landscape covering 200,000 square kilometres. They range from 20 to over 600 metres in length, with walls that are 1.2 metres high. Some of the sandstone blocks used in their construction weigh more than 500 kilograms.

== History of discovery and research ==
The mustatils first came to the attention of researchers in the 1970s. Excavation of one mustatil funded by the Royal Commission for Al-'Ula revealed a chamber at the center containing fragments of cattle skulls, but no remains from other parts of the animals; they are believed to be evidence of a previously unknown cattle cult.

Radiocarbon dating of the skulls revealed that the mustatil, and maybe the others, was built between 5300–5000 BCE, during the Holocene Humid Period, a time when the area was a grassland that went through frequent droughts. This would make the mustatils one of the oldest-known large-scale ritual landscapes in the world.

== See also ==
- Desert kite
- Havilah
