= Gungywamp =

Archaeological site in Groton, Connecticut

Coordinates: 41.39°N 72.06°W

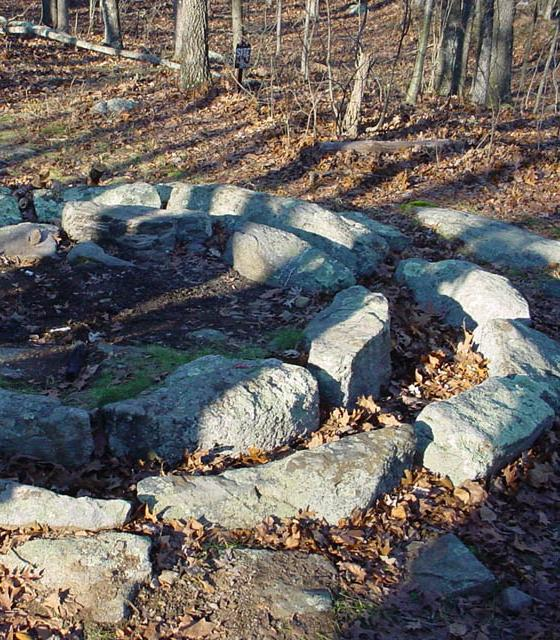
Gungywamp stone circle

Gungywamp /ˈɡʌndʒiwɒmp/ is an archaeological site in Groton, Connecticut consisting of artifacts and the remains of colonial structures. The site includes the remains of houses and a storage structure, as well as a double circle of stones near its center. Two concentric circles of large quarried stones are at the center of the site, 21 large slabs laid end to end.

In 2018, the deed to 270 acres of the original 400-acre parcel was transferred to the State of Connecticut by the YMCA. It was named a State Archaeological Preserve in 2023.

== Overview ==
The 100-acre (40 ha) site consists of multiple elements covering a broad range of time. There are remains of houses and potential cloth and iron processing sites. There are multiple stone chambers believed to be root cellars, two of which are completely intact. Connecticut State Archaeologist Nicholas Bellantoni states that these were root cellars which acted "like an early refrigerator." He adds that "the thing that's unique at Gungywamp is that there are so many of them."

There are two circles of stones near the structures, one within the other, the outermost circle more than ten feet in diameter. The outermost ring is made up of 12 curved stones which archaeologists consider to have been part of a mill. Archaeologist Ken Feder notes that the stones are recumbent rather than upright, unlike European stone circles, and he identifies it as a bark mill used to extract tannin for leather. Animals would pull the mill wheel between the double circle of stones in a circular fashion.

The stone circles are of Native American manufacture. Feder argues that "as storage facilities for root crops, the chambers were intentionally aligned with their openings to the rising of the winter sun in the southern sky" in order to excessively hard freezing of the contents.

== Suggested European influence ==
The stone chambers share similarities with structures from England, Scotland and Ireland, leading some to suggest a transatlantic origin in the constructions. Proponents of this theory suggest their method of construction resembles a technique known as "coping and dyking", which is employed in the British Isles. However, there are important differences between these structures and the technique as used in Europe, and as such, no evidence is present for anything other than a Native American construction.
