= Desert kite =

Converging drystone walls in the Middle East, to aid in hunting herd animals

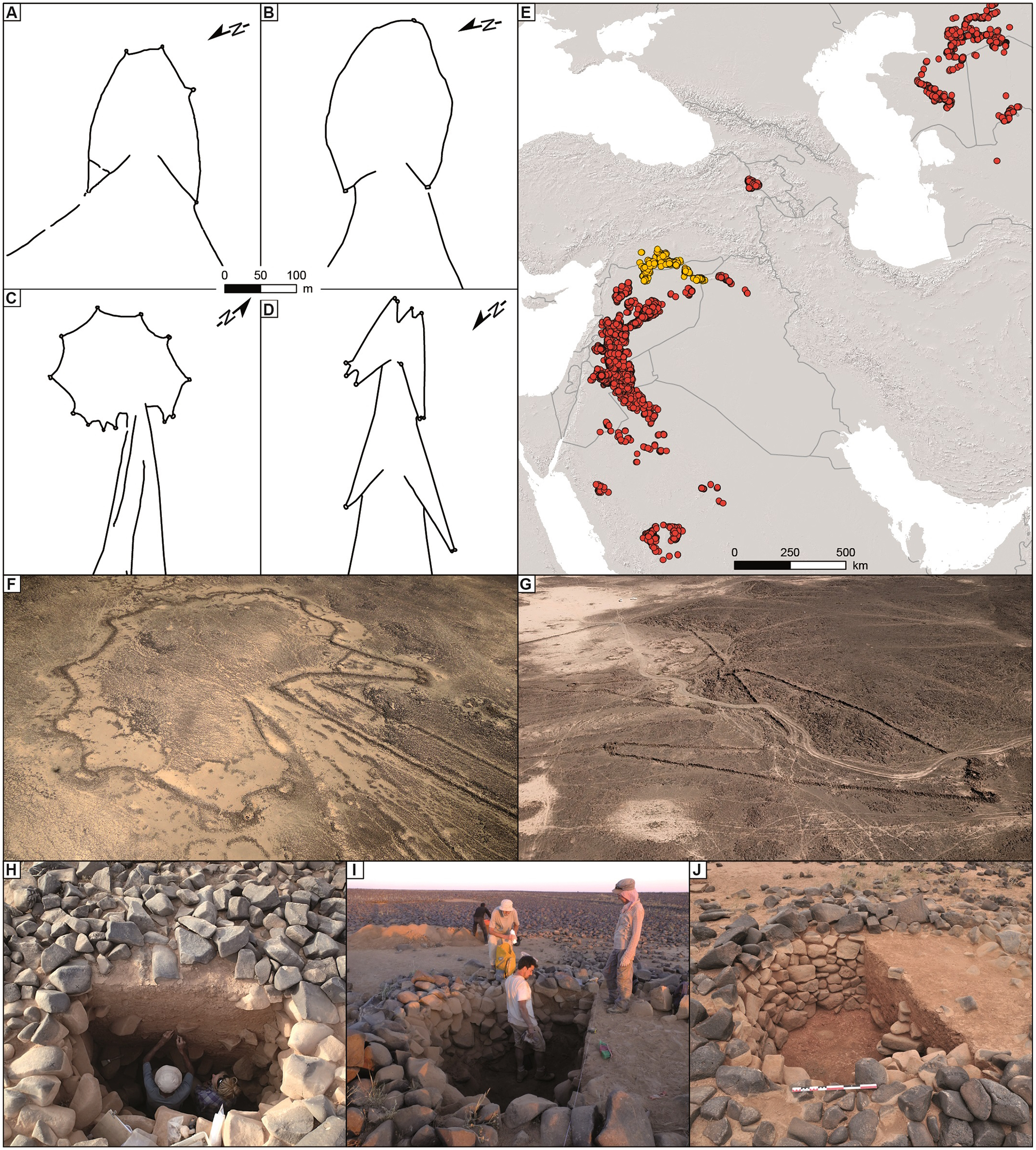
Distribution and characterization of West Asia desert kites.

Desert kites (Arabic: مصائد صحراوية, romanized: maṣāʾid ṣaḥrāwiyya, lit. 'desert traps') are dry stone wall structures found in Southwest Asia (Middle East, but also North Africa, Central Asia and Arabia), which were first discovered from the air during the 1920s. There are over 6,000 known desert kites, with sizes ranging from less than a hundred metres to several kilometres. They typically have a kite shape formed by two convergent "antennae" that run towards an enclosure, all formed by walls of dry stone less than one metre high, but variations exist.

Little is known about their ages, but the few dated examples appear to span the entire Holocene. While the majority view holds that these structures were traps for hunting game animals such as gazelles, which were driven into the kites, a minority view suggests they were used for managing livestock.

== Appearance ==
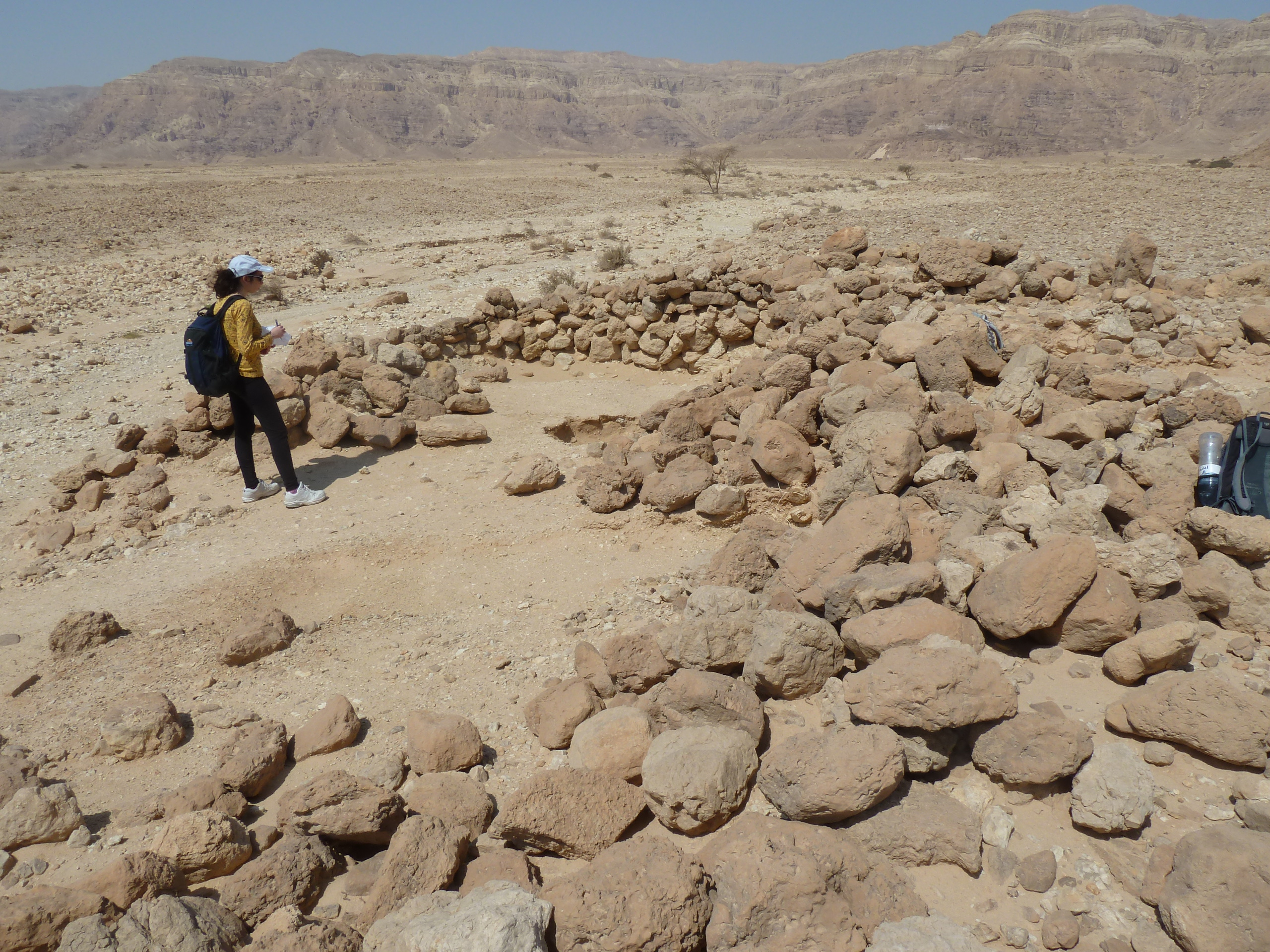
Desert kite in southern Israel

Desert kites are stone structures with a convergent shape, composed of linear piles of stones. The structures have lengths ranging from less than a hundred metres to several kilometres and heights of less than one metre, even accounting for erosion. There often are gaps in the lines, which were presumably either purposeful (left by the builders) or the consequence of lines being formed by alignments of cairns rather than a continuous row.

There are a number of different shapes that are referred to as "desert kites", but common features of all such structures are the lines forming two walls ("antennae") that converge into an enclosure ("head") with attached cells. Different regions have different prevalent kite types. Sometimes the existence of these cells is considered essential for a desert kite to be considered as such.

Research published in 2022 has shown that pits several metres deep often lie at the margins of enclosures, which have been interpreted as traps and killing pits. The kites enclose surface areas with a median of 10,000 square metres (110,000 sq ft), but much larger and much smaller sizes are also known.

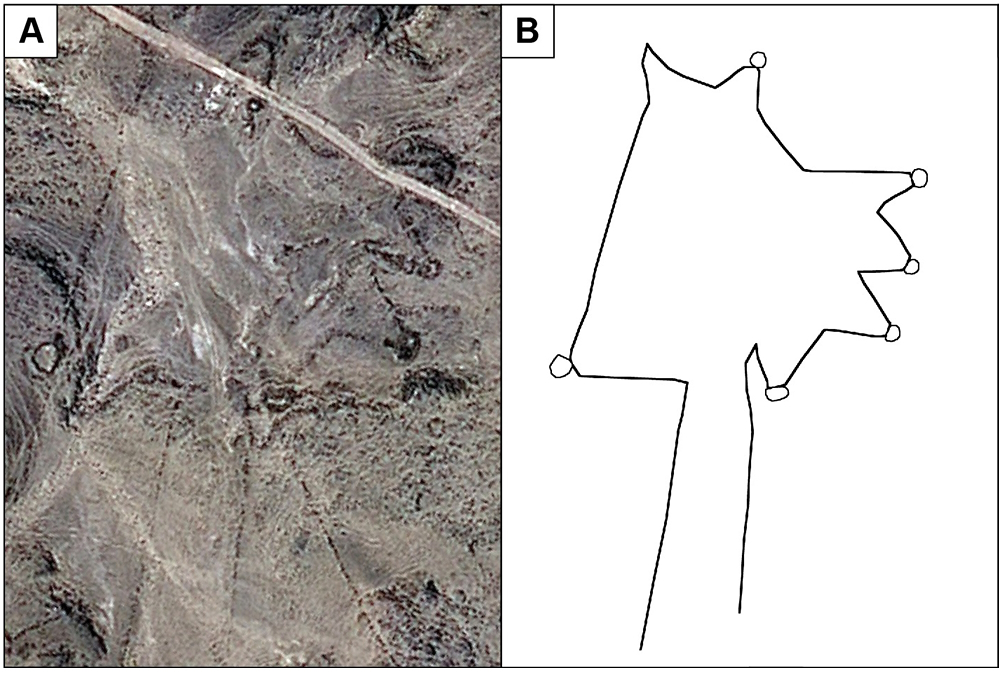
Satellite view of desert kite, with contouring.

They are typically found in areas with elevated but flat topography or topographically complex terrain, but are rare or absent from sloping terrain, mountainous regions, or within endorheic basins, although they occur at the margins of mountains. Often, the terrain within the kite is much more open than the outside terrain, lacking vegetation and rocks. In general, the visibility of the kites from their inside is poor, which appears to be a purposeful feature of their construction; for example, the ends and entrances of the kites often coincide with slope breaks (places where the slope changes). Within a given region, the kites tend to have a preferred orientation. They are absent from humid climates and from certain hyperarid areas, and their use may have been influenced by Holocene climate changes.

Their often enormous size and conspicuousness in arid or semiarid terrain renders them visible in aerial images, while their construction in rough terrain makes them almost invisible on the ground. Sometimes, natural features like cliffs are used in conjunction with the artificial walls to form a kite. Clearing vegetation around the lines or using rocks with a different colour from the background has been documented in volcanic terrain. In Arabia, cairns and linear stone alignments have been found associated with kites.

== Dating ==
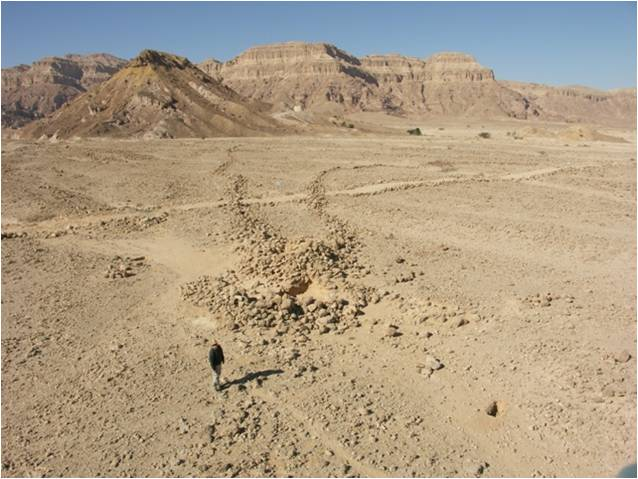
A kite in the Aravah near Kibbutz Samar

Dating kites is difficult; various dating methods like radiocarbon dating and optically stimulated luminescence (OSL) have yielded ages ranging from the early to the late Holocene, and there are sporadic reports of their use in travel records. The early Holocene kites are the most complex man-made structures of that time. Some kites have been overprinted by later archaeological structures, destroyed, eroded or submerged, or built out over time to form more complex shapes. In some places, structures like cairns, tombs or square walls occur alongside kites.

== Occurrence ==
Kites are known from the Middle East and Central Asia, with examples known mainly from Uzbekistan, Kazakhstan, Armenia, Turkey, Iraq, Syria, Lebanon, Israel, Palestine, Jordan, Saudi Arabia, Yemen, Egypt, Libya and Algeria. Kites have also been found in Mongolia and South Africa. As of 2018, there were over 6,000 known kites in Asia and the Middle East, and in some parts of Syria there are as many as 1 kite every 2 square kilometres (0.77 sq mi), to the point that they are partially overlapping or form complicated structures. Similar large enclosures that were presumably used as traps have been found in Europe, where they were dated to Mesolithic and Neolithic age; North America, where structures known as drive lines have been used into the 19th century AD; South America such as at Isluga in the Central Andes; and Japan.

== Function ==
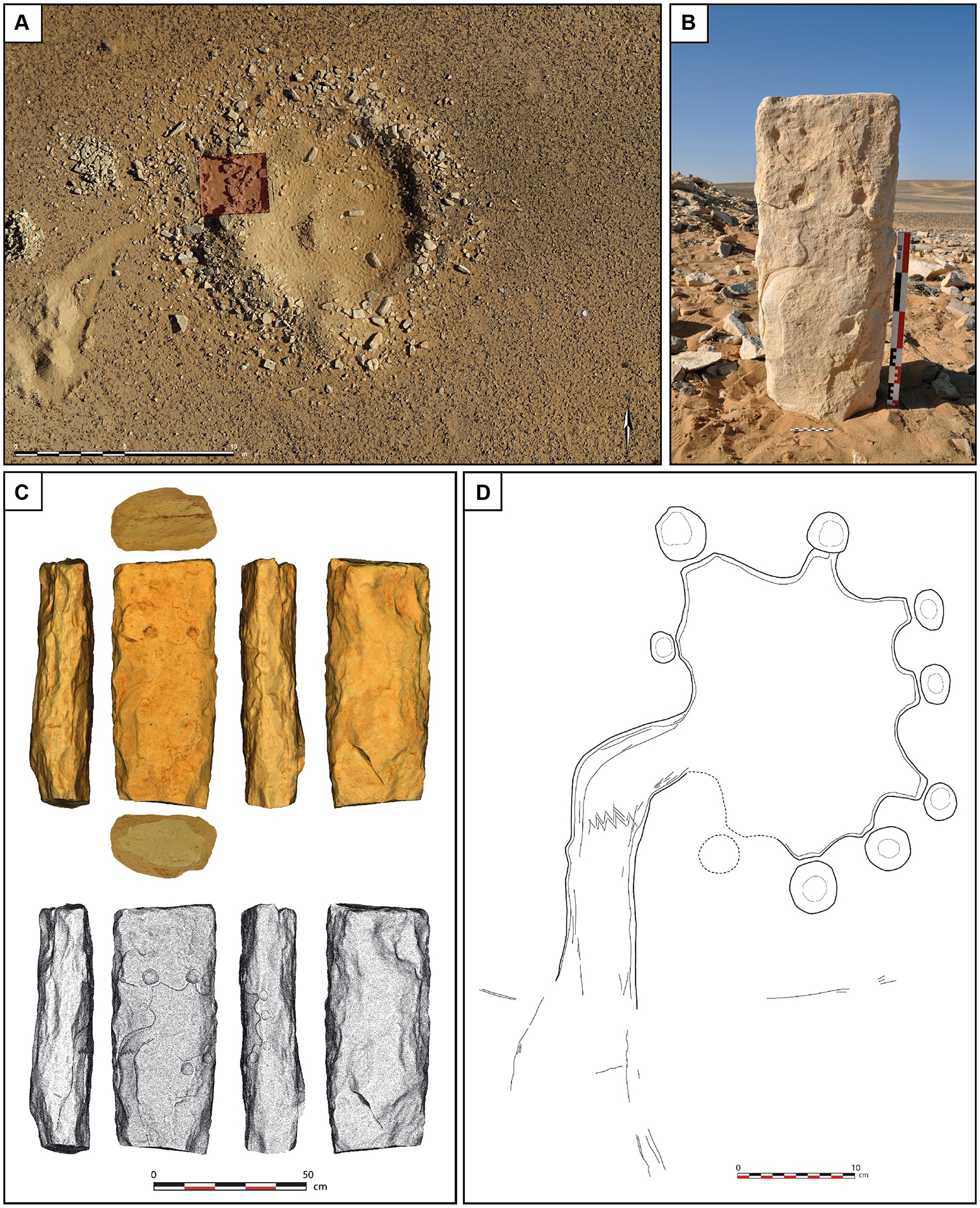
Desert-kite pillar-stone, with engraving of desert-kite, in Jibal al-Khashabiyeh, Jordan. Dated 6930 ± 80 cal. BCE.

Both archaeological studies and ethnographic accounts from the 19th and 20th century indicate that desert kites in the Middle East and North Africa were used as traps for wild game. A minority viewpoint is that they were used for livestock management. The disagreement stems mainly from a lack of factual evidence to support either hypothesis, from disputes on the interpretation of evidence, and from the extinction of traditions involving desert kites. There is almost no evidence of what happened to animals after they were trapped or which animals were targeted, but ethnographic analyses indicate that kites were used to hunt ungulates like gazelles, which live in groups and form defensive formations when threatened.

The usage of traps in catching animals in the steppe is mentioned in the Epic of Gilgamesh. The construction of kites would have required coordinated work from multiple people and are thus indicative of social organization, even if the trapping of animals is a comparatively simple hunting technique. The use of kites in trapping animals is depicted in Israeli, Mongolian and Sinai petroglyphs; these drawings may not always be contemporaneous to the actual usage of the kites. Petroglyphs relating to kites have been found on kites.

Studies show that even low walls or linear structures like pipelines can effectively "guide" animals, which do not attempt to cross the lines even if they are physically able to do so, explaining the effectiveness of desert kites. The low visibility of the kite structures prevents the animals from recognizing the trap. The positioning of pits at the end of convergent enclosures and the presence of small walls delimitating pits from the enclosure would hide the pit from the animals until they are too close to change course in their panic. The entrances often are situated opposite to the direction of animal migration in the region on a wide scale, or of daily animal behaviours on a small scale. The use of desert kites may have had a significant impact on wild animals.

== Research history ==
The usage of kite-like structures to trap animals is attested in 1831. Desert kites were originally identified in aerial images during the 1920s and were initially interpreted as animal traps, enclosures for domesticated animals or fortresses. They are referred to as "desert kites" or "kites", a name bestowed to them by the Royal Air Force pilot Group Captain Lionel Rees, in reference to their resemblance to toy kites. Given that they are commonly found in desert areas, they later became known as "desert kites", which is now the commonly used term in academic literature.

The advent of publicly available satellite imagery such as Google Earth and Google Maps during the 2010s, on which desert kites are visible to everyone, has led to a resurgence of interest in these archaeological sites and the realization that they are widespread. However, without fieldwork, it is difficult to gain a full picture of what they were. Only a very few kites have been excavated or subject to dating efforts, and many of these are not representative of the majority of kites.

Engraved depictions of the layout of desert kites have been found, some of which are schematic and others are like scaled models. Open questions in kite research include what they were used for, when they were used and why the technology is so widespread.

== See also ==
- Buffalo jump
- Fishing weir
- Game drive system
- Hartashen Megalithic Avenue
- Jawa, Jordan
- Mustatil, similar formations in Arabia
- Petroform
