= Archaeological Society of Connecticut =

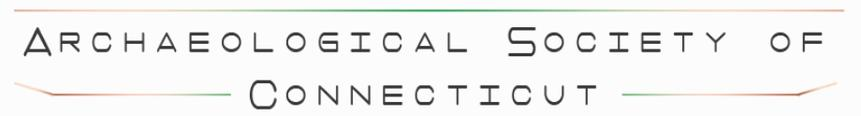
Archaeological Society of Connecticut logo

The Archaeological Society of Connecticut was founded in New Haven in 1934. It has published a journal, the Bulletin of the Archaeological Society of Connecticut, since 1935, the complete run of which is available to view online without subscription. The president of the society is currently David Leslie, PhD, who is the Senior Archaeologist at Archaeological and Historical Services in Storrs.
