= Rhode Island Historical Preservation and Heritage Commission =

- Old Rhode Island State House Home of the Rhode Island Historical Preservation and Heritage Commission
- U.S. National Register of Historic Places
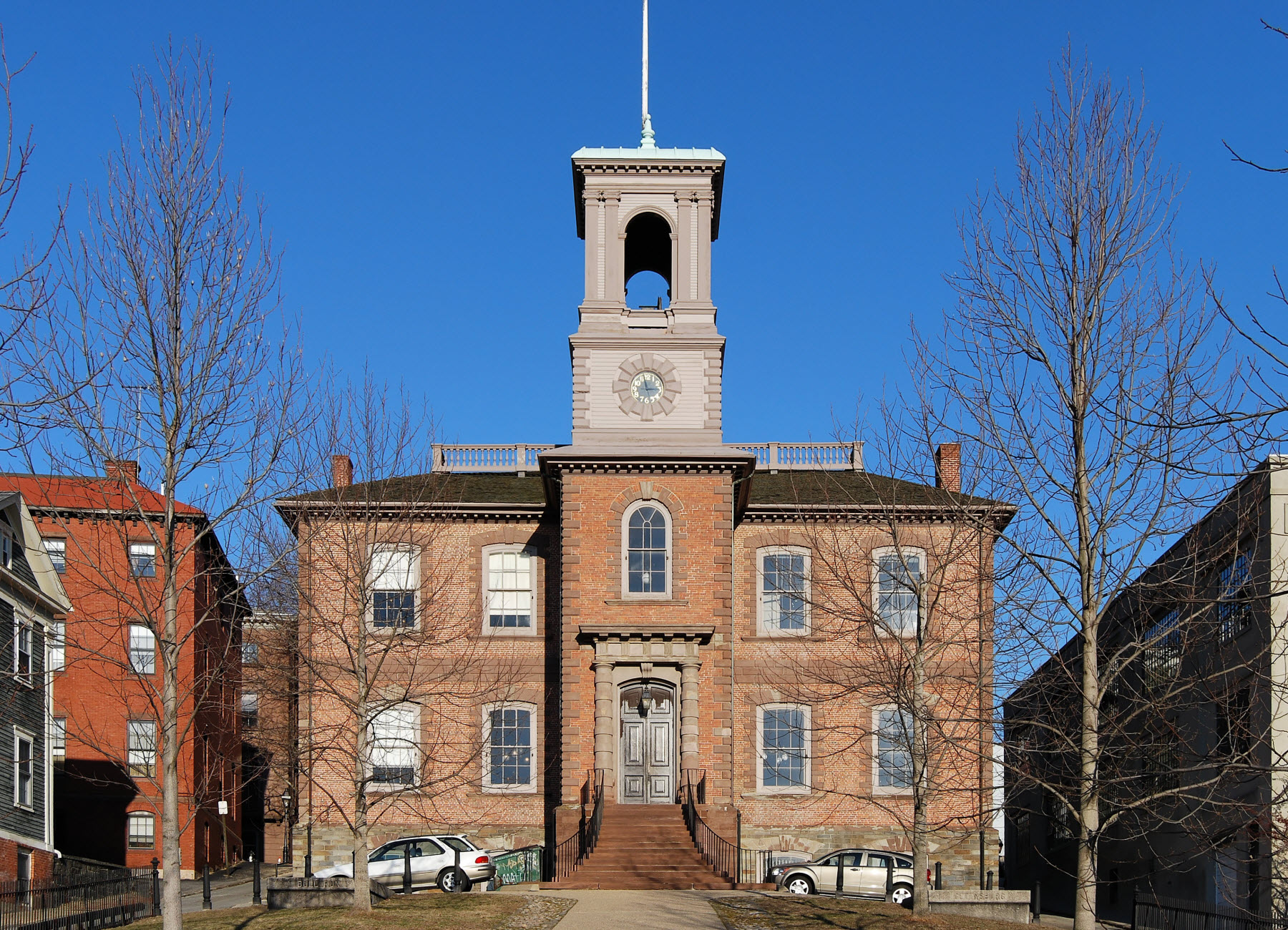
- Old State House in 2008
- Location: 150 Benefit St., Providence, Rhode Island
- Built: 1762
- Architectural style: Georgian architecture
- NRHP reference No.: 70000092
- Added to NRHP: April 28, 1970

The Rhode Island Historical Preservation and Heritage Commission, often called RIHPHC, is an agency run by the state of Rhode Island that aims to preserve the state's history and heritage. The commission works statewide to protect and upkeep historical buildings, districts, archæological sites and structures. It offers partial funding to those renovating or maintaining historical properties. It also has the role of establishing programs designed to record and celebrate the state's culture and heritage. RIHPHC has also published a series of publications on the history of each of Rhode Island's thirty-nine communities and with a list of important historical places located in each.

The current headquarters of the Rhode Island Historical Preservation and Heritage Commission are in the Old State House, which functioned as the state capitol from 1762 to 1901.

Among its former chairs is historical preservationist Antoinette Downing, who held that post for more than three decades beginning in 1968.
