= Noach =

2nd weekly Torah portion in the annual Jewish cycle of Torah reading

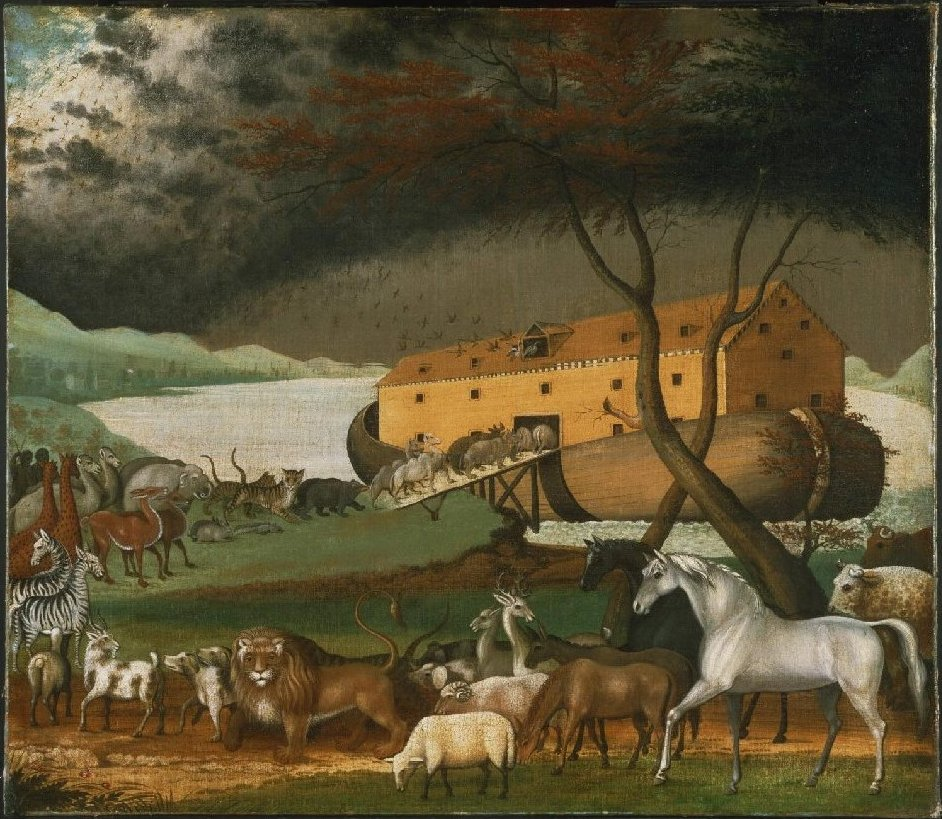
Noah's Ark (1846 painting by Edward Hicks)

Noach (/ˈnoʊ.ɑːk/, /ˈnoʊ.ɑːx/) (Note: From נֹחַ, Hebrew pronunciation: [no.ˈaχ], Hebrew for the name "Noah," the third word, and first distinctive word, of the parashah.) is the second weekly Torah portion (פָּרָשָׁה, parashah) in the annual Jewish cycle of Torah reading. It constitutes Genesis 6:9–11:32. The parashah tells the stories of the Flood and Noah's Ark, of Noah's subsequent drunkenness and cursing of Canaan, and of the Tower of Babel.

The parashah has the most verses of any weekly Torah portion in the Book of Genesis (but not the most letters or words). It is made up of 6,907 Hebrew letters, 1,861 Hebrew words, 153 verses, and 230 lines in a Torah Scroll (סֵפֶר תּוֹרָה, Sefer Torah). (In the Book of Genesis, Parashat Miketz has the most letters, Parashat Vayeira has the most words, and Parashat Vayishlach has an equal number of verses as Parashat Noach.)

Jews read it on the second Sabbath after Simchat Torah, generally in October or early November.

In traditional Sabbath Torah reading, the parashah is divided into seven readings, or עליות, aliyot, and a shorter, concluding reading called the maftir (מפטיר). In the Masoretic Text of the Tanakh (Hebrew Bible), Parashat Noach has five "open portion" (פתוחה, petuchah) divisions (roughly equivalent to paragraphs, often abbreviated with the Hebrew letter פ (peh)). Parashat Noach has several further subdivisions, called "closed portion" (סתומה, setumah) divisions (abbreviated with the Hebrew letter ס (samekh)) within the open portion divisions. The first open portion is from the first reading through the fifth readings. The second and third open portion divisions divide the sixth reading. And the fourth and fifth open portion divisions divide the seventh reading. Closed portion divisions divide the first reading, set off the third and fourth readings, and further divide the sixth and seventh readings.

== First reading—Genesis 6:9–22 ==
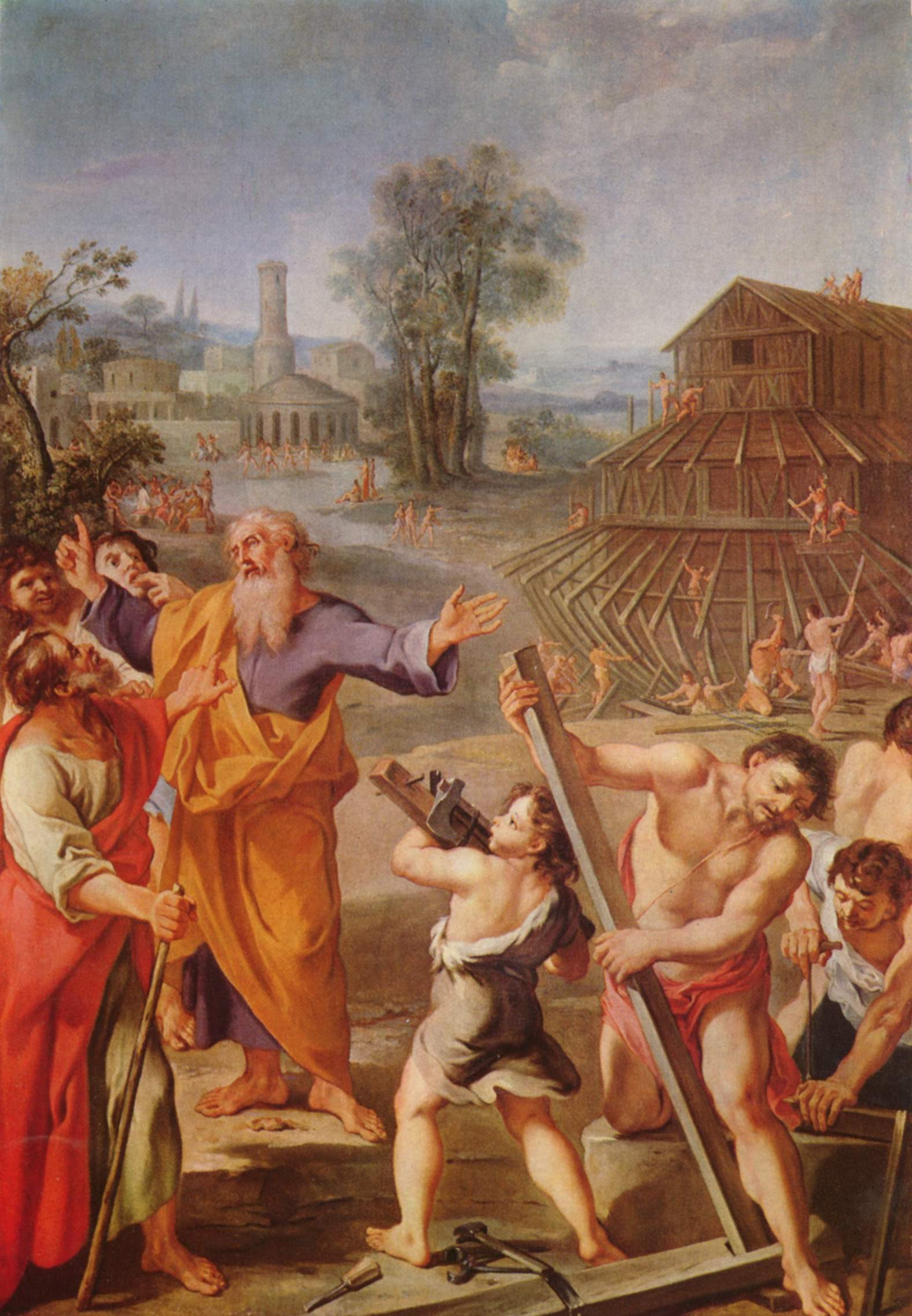
The Building of Noah's Ark (painting by a French master of 1675)

In the first reading, the Torah tells that Noah was a righteous man, blameless in his age, who walked with God. Noah had three sons: Shem, Ham, and Japheth. God saw that all flesh on earth had become corrupt and lawless. The first closed portion ends here.

In the continuation of the reading, God told Noah that God had decided to bring a flood to destroy all flesh. God directed Noah to make an ark of gopher wood and cover it with pitch inside and outside. The Ark was to be 300 cubits long, 50 cubits wide, and 30 cubits high. It was to have an opening for daylight near the top, an entrance on its side, and three decks. God told Noah that God would establish a covenant with Noah, and that he, his sons, his wife, his sons' wives, and two of each kind of beast—male and female—would survive in the Ark. Noah did everything that God commanded him to do. The first reading ends here with the end of chapter 6.

=== In classical rabbinic interpretation ===
The parashah discussed in these rabbinic sources is from the era of the Mishnah and the Talmud:

==== Noah's moral character ====
Interpreting the words, "Noah was a just man, and perfect in his generations," in Genesis 6:9, Rabbi Joḥanan taught that Noah was considered righteous in his generations but would not have been considered righteous in other generations. Resh Lakish, however, maintained that if even in his generations Noah was able to be righteous, then he certainly would have been righteous in other generations. Rabbi Ḥaninah compared Rabbi Joḥanan's view of Noah to a barrel of wine lying in a vault of acid. In its place, its aroma is fragrant (compared to that of the acid). Elsewhere, its aroma would not be considered fragrant. Rabbi Oshaia compared Resh Lakish's view of Noah to a vial of spikenard oil lying amidst refuse. If it is fragrant where it is, how much more so would it be among spices!

Similarly, Rabbi Judah and Rabbi Nehemiah differed in interpreting the words "Noah was a just man, and perfect in his generations," in Genesis 6:9. Rabbi Judah taught that only "in his generations" was he a righteous man (by comparison). Had he lived in the generation of Moses or Samuel, he would not have been called righteous. Rabbi Judah said that in the street of the totally blind, the one-eyed man is called clear-sighted, and the infant is called a scholar. Rabbi Judah compared it to a man with a wine vault who opened one barrel and found it vinegar, opened another and found it vinegar, and opened a third to find it turning sour. When people told him that it was turning, he asked if the vault contained any better. Similarly, "in his generations" Noah was a righteous man. Rabbi Nehemiah, however, taught that if Noah was righteous even in his generation (despite the corrupt environment), how much more so would he have been, had he lived in the age of Moses. Rabbi Nehemiah compared Noah to a tightly closed vial of perfume in a graveyard, which nevertheless gave forth a fragrant aroma. How much more fragrant would it have been outside the graveyard.

==== Walk with god interpretation ====
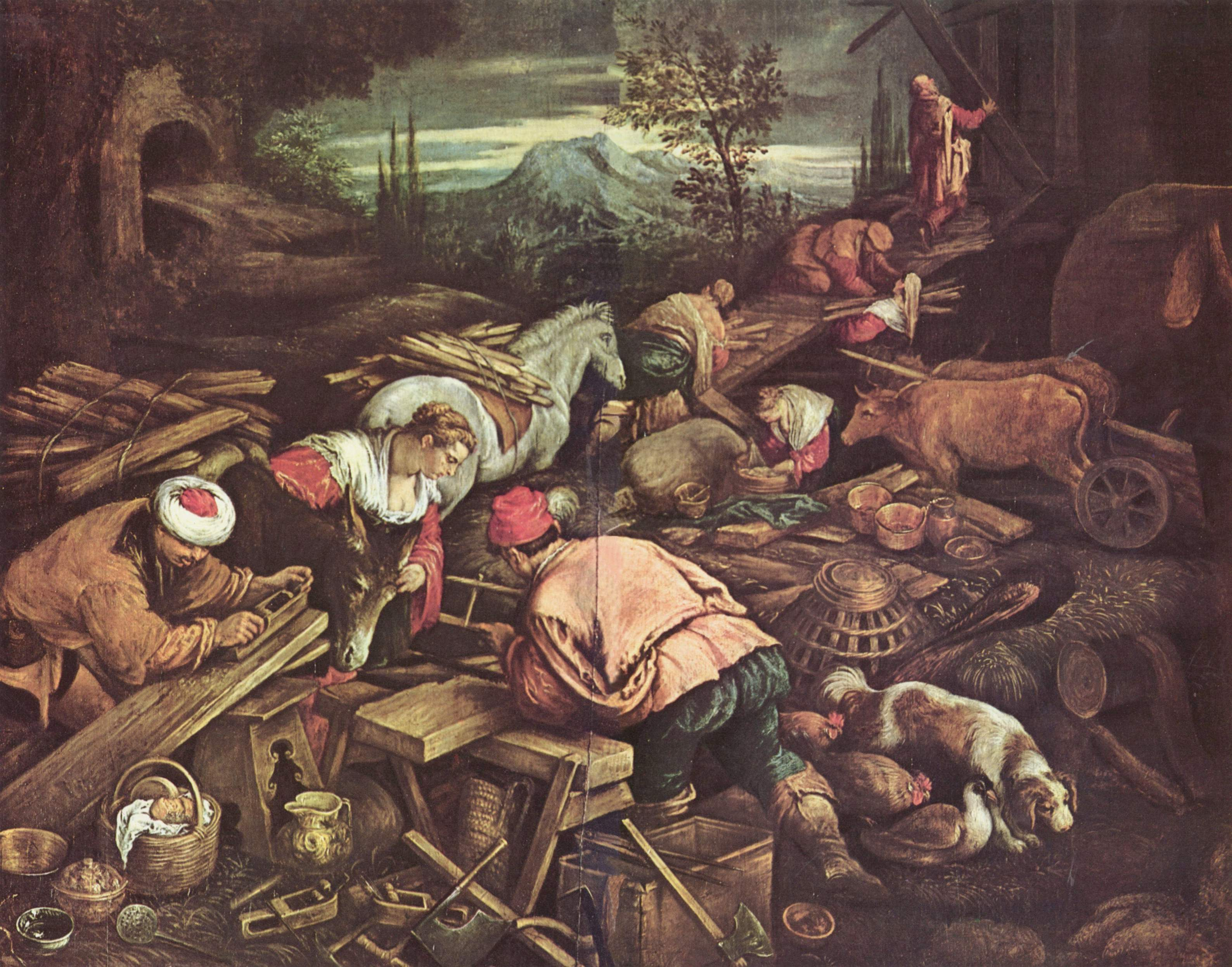
The Building of Noah's Ark (16th-century painting by Jacopo Bassano)

Rabbi Judah contrasted the words "Noah walked with God" in Genesis 6:9 with God's words to Abraham, "walk before Me," in Genesis 17:1. Rabbi Judah compared it to a king who had two sons, one grown up and the other a child. The king asked the child to walk with him. But the king asked the adult to walk before him. Similarly, to Abraham, whose moral strength was great, God said, "Walk before Me." But of Noah, who was feeble, Genesis 6:9 says, "Noah walked with God." Rabbi Nehemiah compared Noah to a king's friend who was plunging about in dark alleys, and when the king saw him sinking in the mud, the king urged his friend to walk with him instead of plunging about. Abraham's case, however, was compared to that of a king who was sinking in dark alleys, and when his friend saw him, the friend shined a light for him through the window. The king then asked his friend to come and shine a light before the king on his way. Thus, God told Abraham that instead of showing a light for God from Mesopotamia, he should come and show one before God in the Land of Israel.

Similarly, a midrash read the words "Noah walked with God" in Genesis 6:9 to mean that God supported Noah, so that Noah should not be overwhelmed by the evil behavior of the generation of the Flood. The midrash compared this to a king whose son went on a mission for his father. The road ahead of him was sunken in mire, and the king supported him so that he would not sink in the mire. However, in the case of Abraham, God said in Genesis 17:1, "walk before Me," and regarding the Patriarchs, Jacob said in Genesis 48:15, "The God before whom my fathers Abraham and Isaac walked." For the Patriarchs would try to anticipate the Divine Presence, and would go ahead to do God's will.

Another midrash, however, read the words of Genesis 6:9, "Noah walked with God" to mean that Noah walked in humility, whole-heartedness, and integrity before his Creator, even as Micah 6:8 says, "And what does the Lord require of you? Only to do justly, and to love mercy, and to walk humbly with your God." Moreover, the midrash taught that Noah took upon himself the yoke of the Seven Commandments and transmitted them to his sons, and thus of him, Proverbs 20:7 says, "He that walks in his integrity as a just man, happy are his children after him."

==== God's regret ====
Rabbi Abba bar Kahana read Genesis 6:7–8 together to report God saying, "I repent that I have made them and Noah." Thus even Noah, who was left, was not worthy, save that (in the words of Genesis 6:8) "Noah found grace in the eyes of the Lord."

==== Marital status ====
Rabbi Abba bar Kahana said that Naamah, the sister of Tubal-cain, mentioned in Genesis 4:22, was Noah's wife. She was called Naamah, because her deeds were pleasing (ne'imim). But the rabbis said that Naamah was a woman of a different stamp, for her name denotes that she sang (man'emet) to the timbrel in honor of idolatry.

The Tosefta taught that the generation of the Flood acted arrogantly before God on account of the good that God lavished on them. So (in the words of Job 21:14–15) "they said to God: 'Depart from us; for we desire not the knowledge of Your ways. What is the Almighty, that we should serve Him? And what profit should we have, if we pray unto Him?'" They scoffed that they needed God for only a few drops of rain, and they deluded themselves that they had rivers and wells that were more than enough for them, and as Genesis 2:6 reports, "there rose up a mist from the earth." God noted that they took excess pride based upon the goodness that God lavished on them, so God replied that with that same goodness God would punish them. And thus Genesis 6:17 reports, "And I, behold, I do bring the flood of waters upon the earth." Similarly, the rabbis taught in a baraita that the good that God lavished upon the generation of the Flood led them to become arrogant.

==== Scope of the sin punished ====
Interpreting the words, "And the earth was corrupt (תִּשָּׁחֵת,tishachet) before God," in Genesis 6:11, a baraita of the School of Rabbi Ishmael taught that whenever Scripture uses the word "corruption," it refers to sexual immorality and idolatry. Reference to sexual immorality appears in Genesis 6:12, which says, "for all flesh had corrupted (הִשְׁחִית,hishchit) their way upon the earth" (and the use of the term "their way" (דַּרְכּוֹ,darko) connotes sexual matters, as Proverbs 30:19 indicates when it says, "the way (דֶרֶךְ,derech) of a man with a young woman"). And Deuteronomy 4:16 shows that "corruption" connotes idolatry when it says, "lest you deal corruptly (תַּשְׁחִתוּן,tashchitun), and make a graven image."

Rabbi Joḥanan deduced from the words "all flesh had corrupted their way upon the earth" in Genesis 6:12 that they mated domesticated animals with wild animals, and animals with humans. Rav Abba bar Kahana taught that after the Flood, they all returned to their own kind, except for the tushlami bird.

Interpreting Genesis 6:13, Rabbi Joḥanan deduced that the consequences of robbery are great. For though the generation of the Flood transgressed all laws, God sealed their decree of punishment only because they robbed. In Genesis 6:13, God told Noah that "the earth is filled with violence (that is, robbery) through them, and behold, I will destroy them with the earth." And Ezekiel 7:11 also states, "Violence (that is, robbery) is risen up into a rod of wickedness; none of them shall remain, nor of their multitude, nor any of theirs; neither shall there be wailing for them." Rabbi Eleazar interpreted Ezekiel 7:11 to teach that violence stood up before God like a staff, and told God that there was no good in any of the generation of the Flood, and none would bewail them when they were gone.

Similarly, midrash interpreted the words, "the earth is filled with violence," in Genesis 6:13 to teach that it was because they were steeped in robbery that they were blotted out from the world.

Interpreting Genesis 6:13, Rabbi Ḥaninah told what the people of the age of the Flood used to do. When a person brought out a basket of beans for sale, one would come and seize less than the worth of the smallest coin in circulation, a perutah (and thus there was no redress under the law). And then everyone would come and seize less than a perutah's worth, so that the seller had no redress at law. Seeing this, God said that the people had acted improperly, so God would deal with them improperly (in a way that they would not relish).

Interpreting Genesis 6:13, Rabbi Levi taught that "violence" (חָמָס, chamas) connotes idolatry, sexual immorality, and murder, as well as robbery. Reference to sexual immorality appears in Jeremiah 51:35, which says, "The violence done to me (חֲמָסִי, chamasi) and to my flesh (שְׁאֵרִי, she'eri) be upon Babylon" (and שְׁאֵר, she'er refers to sexual immorality, for example, in Leviticus 18:6). And reference to murder appears in Joel 4:19, which says, "for the violence (חָמָס, chamas) against the children of Judah, because they have shed innocent blood in their land."

==== Interpretations related to god's instructions ====
Interpreting God's words in Genesis 6:13, "I will destroy them with the earth," Rav Huna and Rabbi Jeremiah in Rav Kahana's name taught that the Flood washed away even the three handbreadths of the Earth's surface that a plough turns. It was as if a prince had a tutor, and whenever the prince did wrong, the king punished the tutor. Or it was as if a young prince had a nurse, and whenever the prince did wrong, the king punished the nurse. Similarly, God said that God would destroy the generation of the Flood along with the earth that nurtured them.

Rabbi Isaac taught that God told Noah that just as a pair of birds (ken) cleansed a person with skin disease (as instructed in Leviticus 14:4–8), so Noah's Ark would cleanse Noah (so that he would be worthy to be saved from the Flood).

Rabbi Yassa noted that in four places, Scripture uses the expression, "make for yourself (עֲשֵׂה לְךָ, oseh l'cha)." In three of those instances, God explained the material from which to make the thing, and in one God did not. Genesis 6:14 says, "Make for yourself an ark of gopher wood"; Numbers 10:2 says, "make for yourself two silver trumpets"; and Joshua 5:2 says, "make for yourself knives of flint." But Numbers 21:8 says merely, "make for yourself a fiery serpent" without further explanation. So Moses reasoned that a serpent is essentially a snake, and made the snake of copper, because in Hebrew, the word for copper (נְחֹשֶׁת, nechoshet) sounds like the word for snake (נְחַשׁ, nechash).

Rav Adda taught that the scholars of Rav Shila interpreted "gopher wood" in Genesis 6:14 to mean mabliga (a resinous species of cedar), while others maintained it was golamish (a very hard and stone-like species of cedar).

While Genesis 6:14 tells that Noah's Ark had pitch "within and without," Exodus 2:3 tells that Jochebed daubed the Ark of the infant Moses "with slime and with pitch". A Tanna taught that the slime was inside and the pitch outside so that that righteous child would not have to smell the bad odor of the pitch.

Reading God's words in Genesis 6:15, "And this is how you shall make it" to indicate that God pointed with God's finger, Rabbi Ishmael said that each of the five fingers of God's right hand appertain to the mystery of Redemption. Rabbi Ishmael said that God showed the little finger of the hand to Noah, pointing out how to make the Ark, as in Genesis 6:15, God says, "And this is how you shall make it." With the second finger, next to the little one, God smote the Egyptians with the ten plagues, as Exodus 8:15 (8:19 in the KJV) says, "The magicians said to Pharaoh, 'This is the finger of God.'" With the middle finger, God wrote the Tablets of Stone, as Exodus 31:18 says, "And He gave to Moses, when He had made an end of communing with him ... tables of stone, written with the finger of God." With the index finger, God showed Moses what the children of Israel should give for the redemption of their souls, as Exodus 30:13 says, "This they shall give ... half a shekel for an offering to the Lord." With the thumb and all the hand, God will in the future smite God's enemies (who Rabbi Ishmael identified as the children of Esau and Ishmael), as Micah 5:9 says, "Let your hand be lifted up above your adversaries, and let all your enemies be cut off."

Rabbi Joḥanan interpreted the words, "A light (צֹהַר, tzohar) shall you make to the Ark," in Genesis 6:16 to teach that God instructed Noah to set therein luminous precious stones and jewels, so that they might give light as bright as noon (צָּהֳרָיִם, tzaharayim). Similarly, Rav Aḥava bar Zeira taught that when Noah entered the Ark, he brought precious stones and jewels with him to keep track of day and night. When the jewels shone dimly, he knew that it was daytime, and when they shone brightly, he knew that it was night. The Gemara noted that it was important for Noah to be able to tell day from night, for some animals eat only during the day, and others eat only during the night, and thus Noah could determine the proper feeding times for the animals under his care. The Gemara noted that if in Genesis 6:16 God told Noah, "A window shall you make to the ark," then Noah should have been able to tell day from night. The Gemara explained that Noah needed the jewels because the account of Noah bringing jewels into the Ark followed the view that the celestial bodies—including the sun—did not serve during the year of the Flood. (Thus, no sunlight entered the Ark, and Genesis 6:16 must refer to jewels rather than a window.)

The Gemara read the words, "and to a cubit shall you finish it upward," in Genesis 6:16 to ensure that thus would it stand firm (with the sides of the roof sloping, so that the rain would fall off it).

A Tanna read the words "with lower, second, and third stories shall you make it," in Genesis 6:16, to teach that the bottom story was for the dung, the middle for the animals, and the top for Noah's family. A midrash, however, reported that some said that the words "with lower, second, and third stories shall you make it" meant that the bottom story was for waste, the second for Noah's family and the clean animals, and the third for the unclean animals. And the midrash reported that others said that the bottom story was for the unclean animals, the second for Noah's family and the clean animals, and the top for the garbage. The midrash taught that Noah managed to move the waste by arranging a kind of trapdoor through which he shoveled it sideways.

==== Interpretations related to the mocking of Noah by contemporaries ====
Noting that Genesis 6:9 calls Noah "a man," a midrash taught that wherever Scripture employs the term "a man," it indicates a righteous man who warned his generation. The midrash taught that for 120 years (deduced from Genesis 6:3), Noah planted cedars and cut them down. When they would ask him what he was doing, he would reply that God had informed him that God was bringing a flood. Noah's contemporaries replied that if a flood did come, it would come only on Noah's father's house. Rabbi Abba taught that God said that one herald arose for God in the generation of the Flood—Noah. But they despised him and called him a contemptible old man.

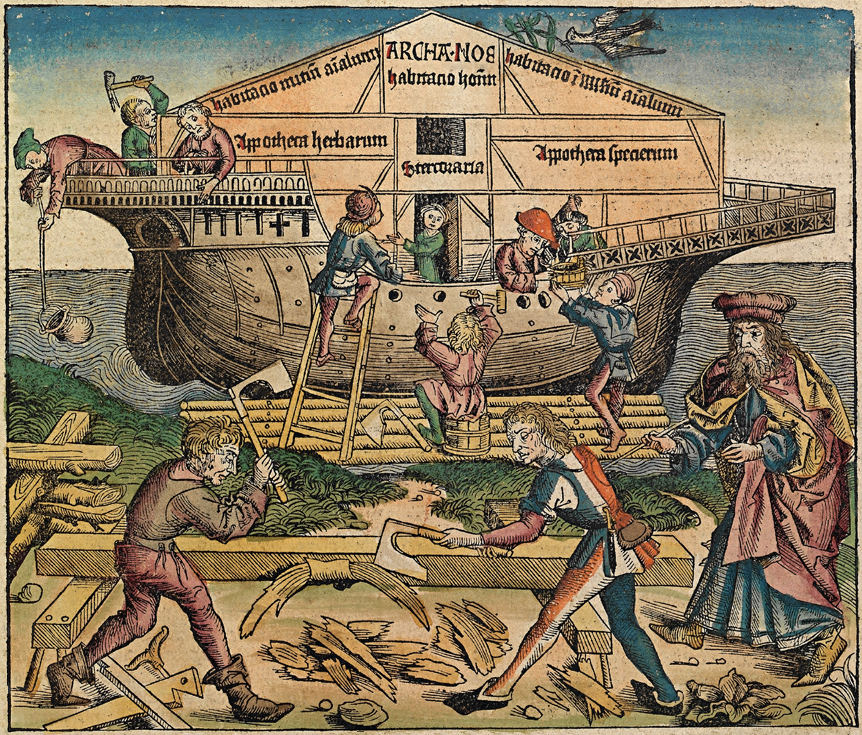
Noah's Ark (illustration from the 1493 Nuremberg Chronicle)

Similarly, Rabbi Jose of Caesarea read the words, "He is swift upon the face of the waters; their portion is cursed in the earth, he turns not by the way of the vineyards," in Job 24:18 to teach that the righteous Noah rebuked his contemporaries. Noah urged them to repent, or God would bring a deluge upon them and cause their bodies to float upon the water like gourds, reading Job 24:18 to say, "He floats lightly upon the face of the waters." Moreover, Noah told them that they would be taken as a curse for all future generations, as Job 24:18 says, "their portion is cursed." And Rabbi Jose of Caesarea taught that the words, "he turns not by the way of the vineyards," indicate that as the people worked in their vineyards, they asked Noah what prevented God from bringing the Flood at that moment. And Noah replied that God had one dear one, one dove, to draw out before God could bring the Flood. (That is, the aged Methuselah had to die first, so that he would not suffer the punishment of the Flood).

Similarly, a midrash taught that Noah reproved them, calling them good-for-nothings who forsook the One whose voice breaks cedars, to worship a dry log. But they reacted as in Amos 5:10, which says, "They hate him that reproves in the gate, and they abhor him that speaks uprightly."

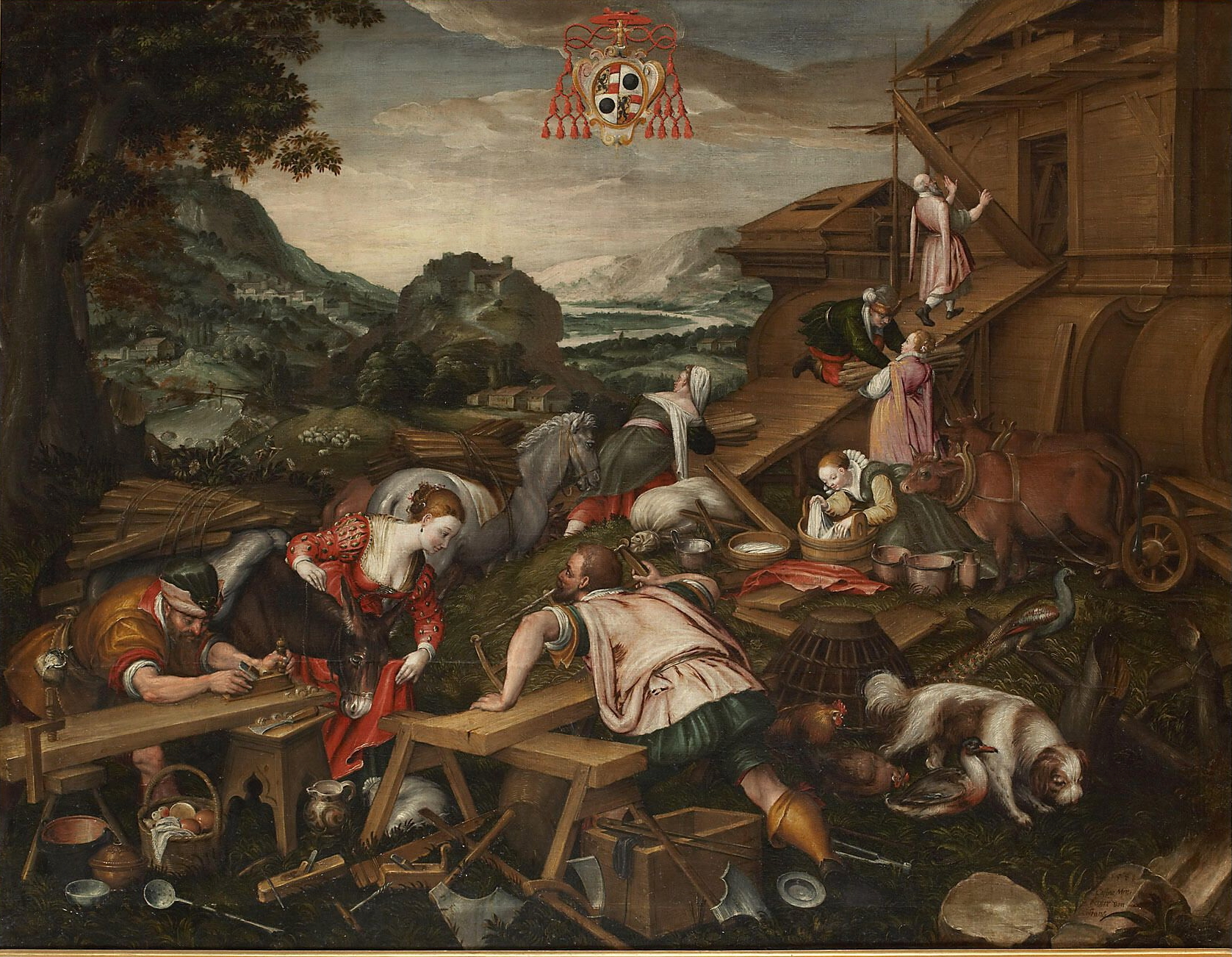
Construction of Noah's Ark (late 16th-century painting by Kaspar Memberger the Elder)

And Rava interpreted the words of Job 12:5, "He that is ready to slip with his feet is as a stone despised in the thought of him that is at ease," to teach that when Noah rebuked them and spoke words as hard as fiery flints, they would deride him. They called Noah "old man," and asked him what the Ark was for. Noah replied that God was bringing a flood upon them. They asked with what God would flood the earth. If God brought a flood of fire, they said, they had a thing called alitha (that would extinguish fire). If God brought a flood of water up from the earth, they said, they had iron plates with which they could cover the earth (to prevent the water from coming up). If God brought a flood of water from heaven, they said, they had a thing called akob (or some say akosh) (that could ward it off). Noah replied that God would bring it from between the heels of their feet, as Job 12:5 says, "He is ready for the steps of your feet."

A midrash compared Noah to Moses and found Moses superior. While Noah was worthy to be delivered from the generation of the Flood, he saved only himself and his family and had insufficient strength to deliver his generation. Moses, however, saved both himself and his generation when they were condemned to destruction after the sin of the Golden Calf, as Exodus 32:14 reports, "And the Lord repented of the evil that He said He would do to His people." The midrash compared the cases to two ships in danger on the high seas, on board of which were two pilots. One saved himself but not his ship, and the other saved both himself and his ship.

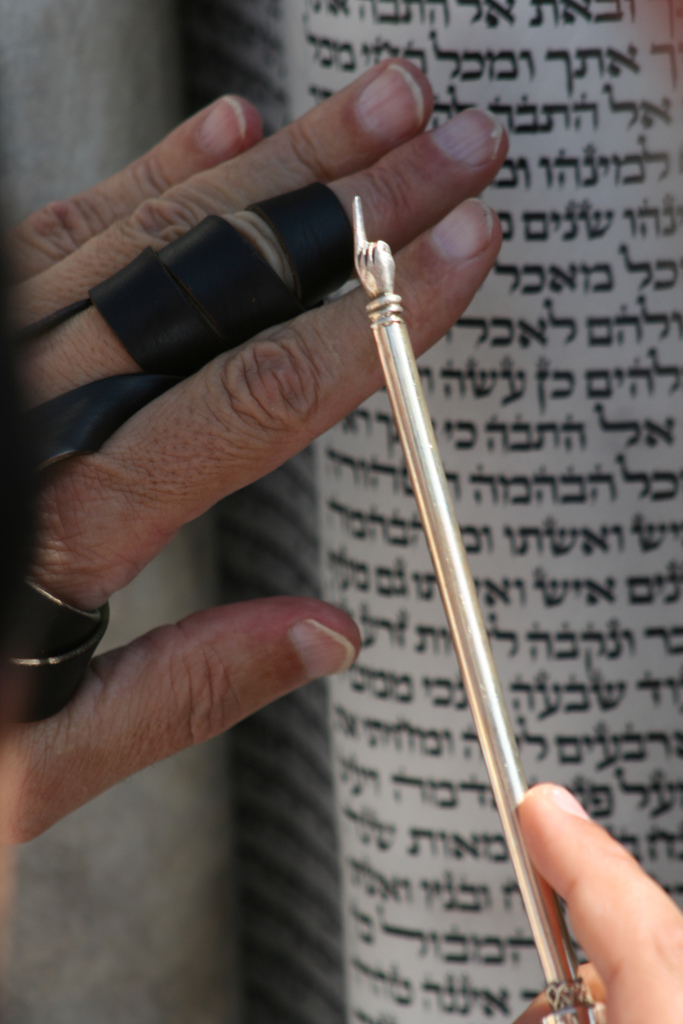
Genesis 6:18–7:8 in a Torah scroll

==== Regarding condition inside the Ark ====
Reading God's words to Noah in Genesis 6:18, "But I will establish My covenant with you," a midrash taught that God was telling Noah that he would need a covenant to ensure that the produce would not decay or rot on the Ark. Further, the midrash taught, Noah needed a covenant to prevent giants from plugging the openings of the deep and seeking to enter the Ark, and to prevent additional lions from coming into the Ark. Rabbi Ḥiyya bar Abba explained that God was thus telling Noah that though he may have built the Ark, but for God's covenant, Noah could not have entered the Ark. Thus, Noah's ability to enter the Ark at all was proof of the covenant God established with Noah in Genesis 6:18.

Rabbi Hanan said in the name of Rabbi Samuel ben Isaac that as soon as Noah entered the Ark, God prohibited his family from cohabitation, saying in Genesis 6:18: "you shall come into the Ark, you, and your sons," speaking of them apart, and "your wife, and your sons' wives," speaking of them apart. When Noah left the Ark, God permitted cohabitation to him again, saying in Genesis 8:16: "Go forth from the Ark, you and your wife," speaking of them together. Similarly, Rabbi Joḥanan deduced from the same sources that God had forbidden cohabitation for all the Ark's inhabitants. The rabbis taught in a baraita that three nonetheless cohabited in the Ark—the dog, the raven, and Ham—and they were all punished.

=== In medieval Jewish interpretation ===
The parashah is discussed in these medieval Jewish sources:

Baḥya ibn Paquda read the description "perfect" (תָּמִים, tamim) in Genesis 6:9 to describe one who aims to make one's exterior and interior selves equal and consistent in the service of God, so that the testimony of the heart, tongue, and limbs are alike and support and confirm each other.

Maimonides taught that God, being incorporeal, is elevated above the use of a sense of sight. Thus, when Scripture says that God "sees"—as in Genesis 6:12, "And God saw the earth, and behold, it was corrupt"—it means that God perceives visible things. Maimonides thus argued that "God saw" would be more properly translated "it was revealed before God."

Maimonides taught that whenever Scripture relates that God spoke to a person, this took place in a dream or in a prophetic vision. Thus Genesis 6:13, "And God said to Noah," reports a prophecy proclaimed by Noah acting as a prophet.

Abraham ibn Ezra wrote that Genesis 6:18, "But I will establish My covenant," could be read to indicate that God had sworn earlier to Noah that he and his children would not die in the Flood, even though the text had not previously mentioned it. Alternatively, ibn Ezra taught that "But I will establish" meant that God would keep God's oath. Ibn Ezra also taught that the "covenant" alluded to the covenant that God would make when God set the rainbow in the sky in Genesis 9:8–17. After reviewing Ibn Ezra's analysis, Naḥmanides argued that the expression, "And I will establish My covenant," meant that when the Flood came, God's covenant would be established with Noah so that he and his family and two of all the animals would come into the Ark and remain alive, and "covenant" meant God's word when God decrees something without any condition and fulfills it. Naḥmanides also taught that by way of the Kabbalah, the covenant (בְּרִית, berit) is everlasting, the word being derived from Genesis 1:1, "In the beginning God created (בָּרָא, bara)." God thus commanded that the covenant exist and be with the righteous Noah.

Maimonides taught that before Abraham's birth, only a very few people recognized or knew God in the world, among them Enoch, Methuselah, Noah, Shem, and Eber.

The Zohar compared Moses to Noah and found Moses superior. For when God told Moses in Exodus 32:10, "Now therefore let me alone, that My anger may grow hot against them, and that I may consume them; and I will make of you a great nation," Moses immediately asked whether he could possibly abandon Israel for his own advantage. Moses protested that the world would say that he had killed Israel and did to them as Noah did to his generation. For when God bade Noah to save himself and his household from the Flood, Noah did not intercede on behalf of his generation but let them perish. It is for this reason that Scripture names the waters of the Flood after Noah, as Isaiah 54:9 says, "For this is as the waters of Noah to me." Thus, Moses sought mercy for his people, and God indeed showed them mercy.

=== In modern interpretation ===
The parashah is discussed in these modern sources:

Ephraim Speiser contrasted the reason for the Flood given by the Jahwist in Genesis 6:5–8—that God “regretted” with “sorrow in His heart” that man had not been able to master his evil impulses—with the reason given by the Priestly source in Genesis 6:13—that the world was lawless and thus had to be destroyed.

Although the text does not name Noah's wife when it mentions her in Genesis 6:18; 7:7, 13; and 8:18, Carol Meyers reported that postbiblical discussions of the Genesis Flood story assigned her more than 103 different names.

=== In inner-biblical interpretation ===
The parashah has parallels or is discussed in these Biblical sources:

The wording of Genesis 6:9, "Noah was a righteous (תָּמִים, tamim) man," is echoed in relation to Abram in Genesis 17:1: "the Eternal appeared to Abram and said to him, 'I am El Shaddai—walk along before Me and be pure of heart (תָּמִים, tamim)'."

In Genesis 6:13, God shared God's purpose with Noah, saying, "I have decided to put an end to all flesh," and in an internal dialogue in Genesis 18:17–19, God asked, "Shall I hide from Abraham what I am about to do ... ? For I have singled him out, that he may instruct his children and his posterity to keep the way of the Lord by doing what is just and right, in order that the Lord may bring about for Abraham what He has promised him." Similarly, in Amos 3:7, the 8th century BCE prophet Amos reported, "Indeed, my Sovereign God does nothing without having revealed the purpose to God's servants the prophets."

== Second reading—Genesis 7:1–16 ==
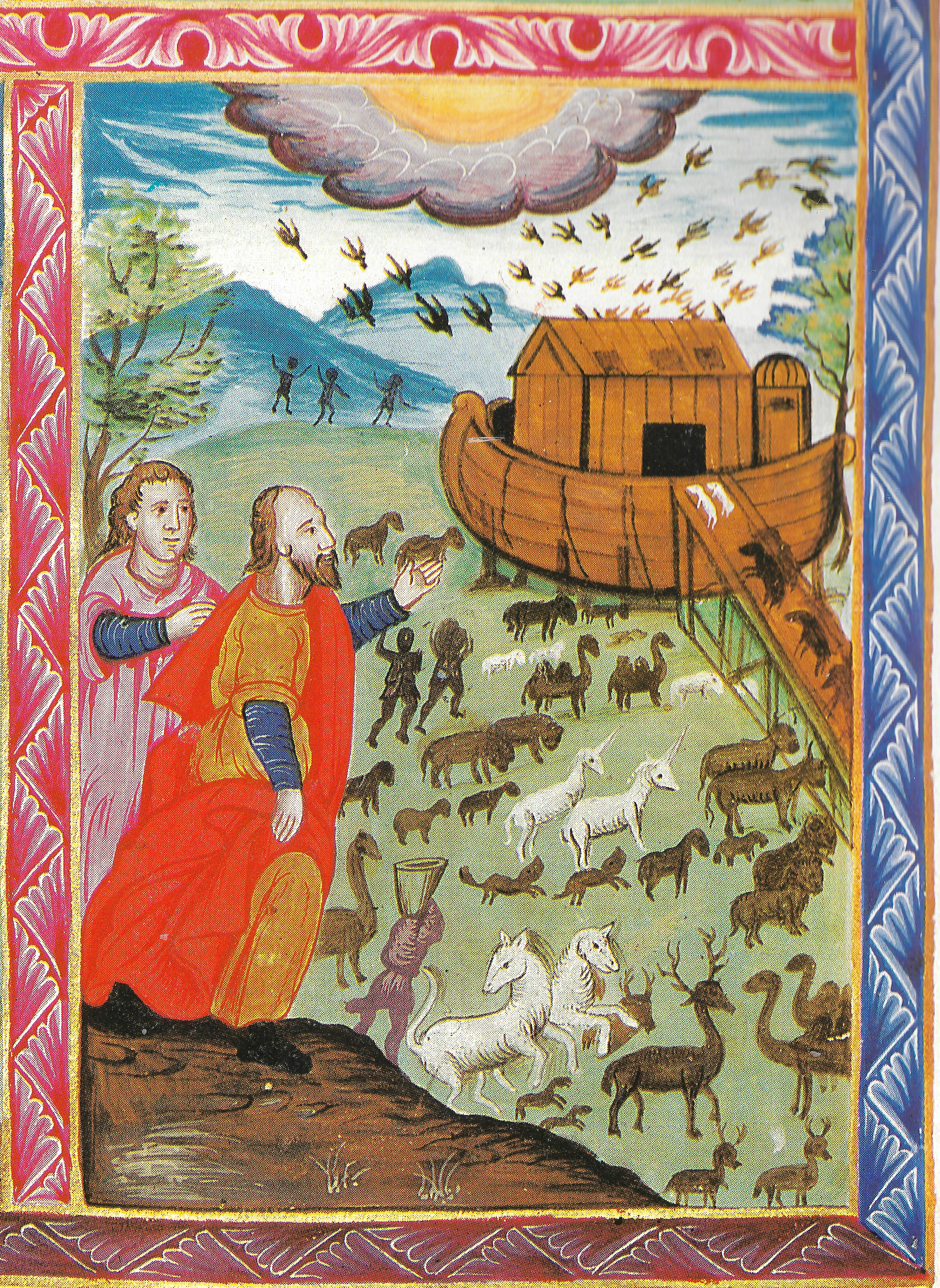
Armenian icon depicting Noah and the animals embarking the ark, 1643

In the second reading, in chapter 7, seven days before the Flood, God told Noah to go into the Ark with his household, and to take seven pairs of every clean animal and every bird, and two pairs of every other animal, to keep their species alive. When Noah was 600 years old, the Flood came, and that same day, Noah, his family and the beasts went into the Ark, and God shut him in. The second reading ends here.

=== In classical rabbinic interpretation ===
==== The differentiation of clean and unclean ====
Reading in Genesis 7:2 the command that "of every clean beast you shall take seven, man and wife," the Gemara asked whether beasts have marital relationships. Rabbi Samuel bar Naḥman said in Rabbi Jonathan's name that the command means of those animals with which no sin had been committed (that is, animals that had not mated with other species). The Gemara asked how Noah would know. Rav Ḥisda taught that Noah led them past the Ark, and those that the Ark accepted had certainly not been the object of sin, while those that the Ark rejected had certainly been the object of sin. And Rabbi Abbahu taught that Noah took only those animals (fulfilling that condition) that came of their own accord. Similarly, Rav Ḥisda asked how Noah knew (before the giving of Leviticus 11) which animals were clean and which were unclean. Rav Ḥisda explained that Noah led them past the Ark, and those that the Ark accepted (in multiples of seven) were certainly clean, and those that the Ark rejected were certainly unclean. Rabbi Abbahu cited Genesis 7:16, "And they that went in, went in male and female," to show that they went in of their own accord (in their respective pairs, seven of the clean and two of the unclean).

The Gemara read Genesis 7:8 to employ the euphemistic expression "not clean," instead of the brief but disparaging expression "unclean," so as not to speak disparagingly of unclean animals. The Gemara reasoned that it was thus likely that Scripture would use euphemisms when speaking of the faults of righteous people, as with the words, "And the eyes of Leah were weak," in Genesis 29:17.

==== Meaning of "Seven animals each" ====
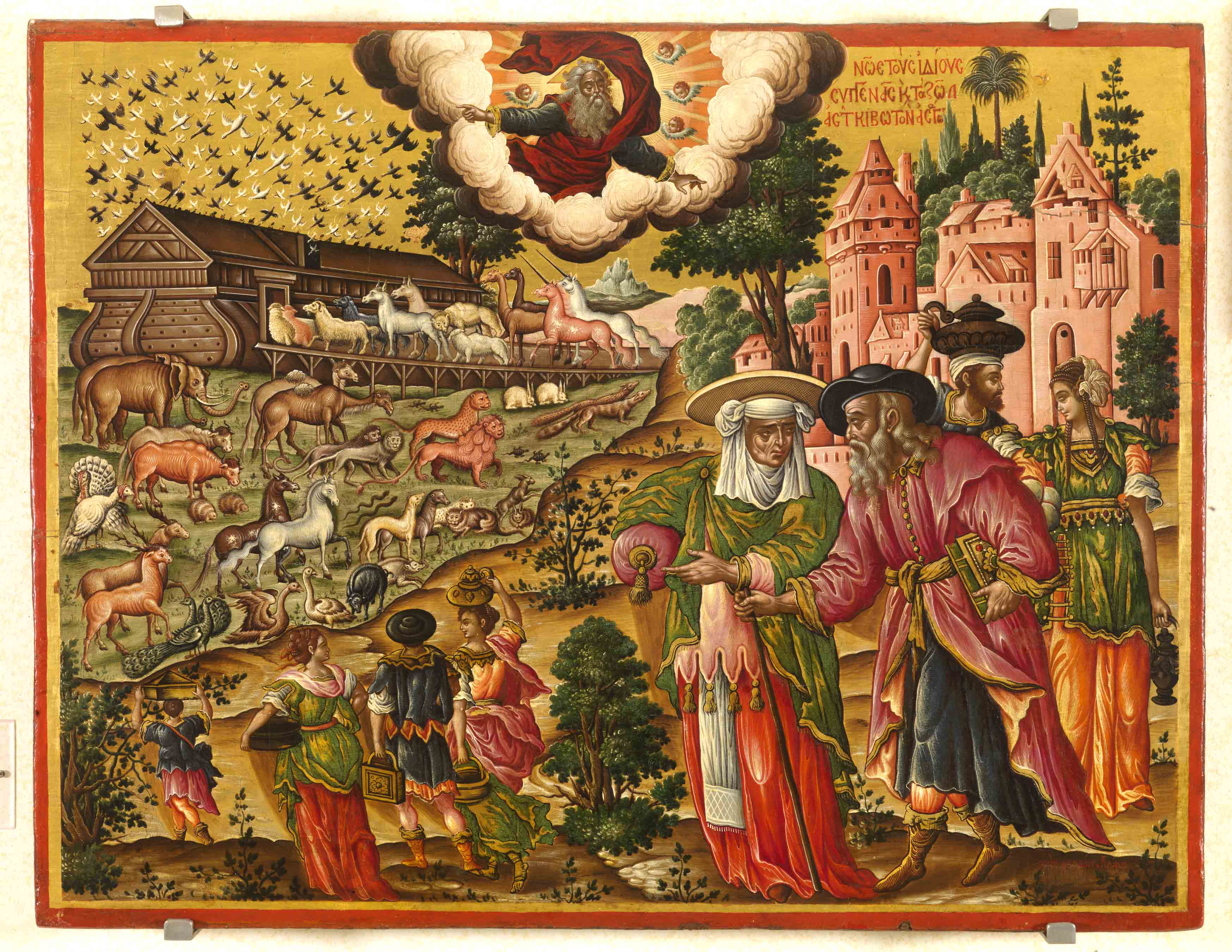
Noah's Ark by Theodoros Poulakis, 17th century

Reading in Genesis 7:3 the command to take into the Ark "of the fowl also of the air, seven each," a midrash hypothesized that the command might have meant seven of each kind of animal (three of one gender and four of the other). But then one of them would lack a mate. Hence the midrash concluded that God meant seven males and seven females. Of course, God did not need them, but they were to come (in the words of Genesis 7:3) "to keep seed alive upon the face of all the earth". The Gemara interpreted the words "every bird (צִפּוֹר, tzippor) of any winged (כָּנָף, kanaf) [species]" in Genesis 7:14. The Gemara read the word "bird" (צִפּוֹר, tzippor) here to refer only to clean birds, and "winged" (כָּנָף, kanaf) to include both unclean birds and grasshoppers.

==== 40 day quarantine ====
Rabbi Simeon ben Yoḥai taught that because the generation of the Flood transgressed the Torah that God gave humanity after Moses had stayed on the mountain for 40 days and 40 nights (as reported in Exodus 24:18 and 34:28 and Deuteronomy 9:9–11, 18, 25; and 10:10), God announced in Genesis 7:4 that God would "cause it to rain upon the earth 40 days and 40 nights." Similarly, Rabbi Joḥanan taught that because the generation of the Flood corrupted the features that take shape after 40 days (in the womb), God announced in Genesis 7:4 that God would "cause it to rain upon the earth 40 days and 40 nights, and every living substance that I have made will I blot out."

==== Possible inclusion of cain in the purge ====
Reading in Genesis 7:4 that God said, "every living substance (יְקוּם, yekum) that I have made will I blot out," Rabbi Abin taught that this included the one who rose up (יָּקָם, yakam) against his brother—Cain. Rabbi Levi said in the name of Resh Lakish that God kept Cain's judgment in suspense until the Flood and then God swept Cain away. And thus, Rabbi Levi read Genesis 7:23 to say, "And He blotted out every one that had arisen."

A midrash read the words "And Noah did all that the Lord commanded him," in Genesis 7:5 narrowly to refer to the taking in of the animals, beasts, and birds.

==== Seven days before the flood ====
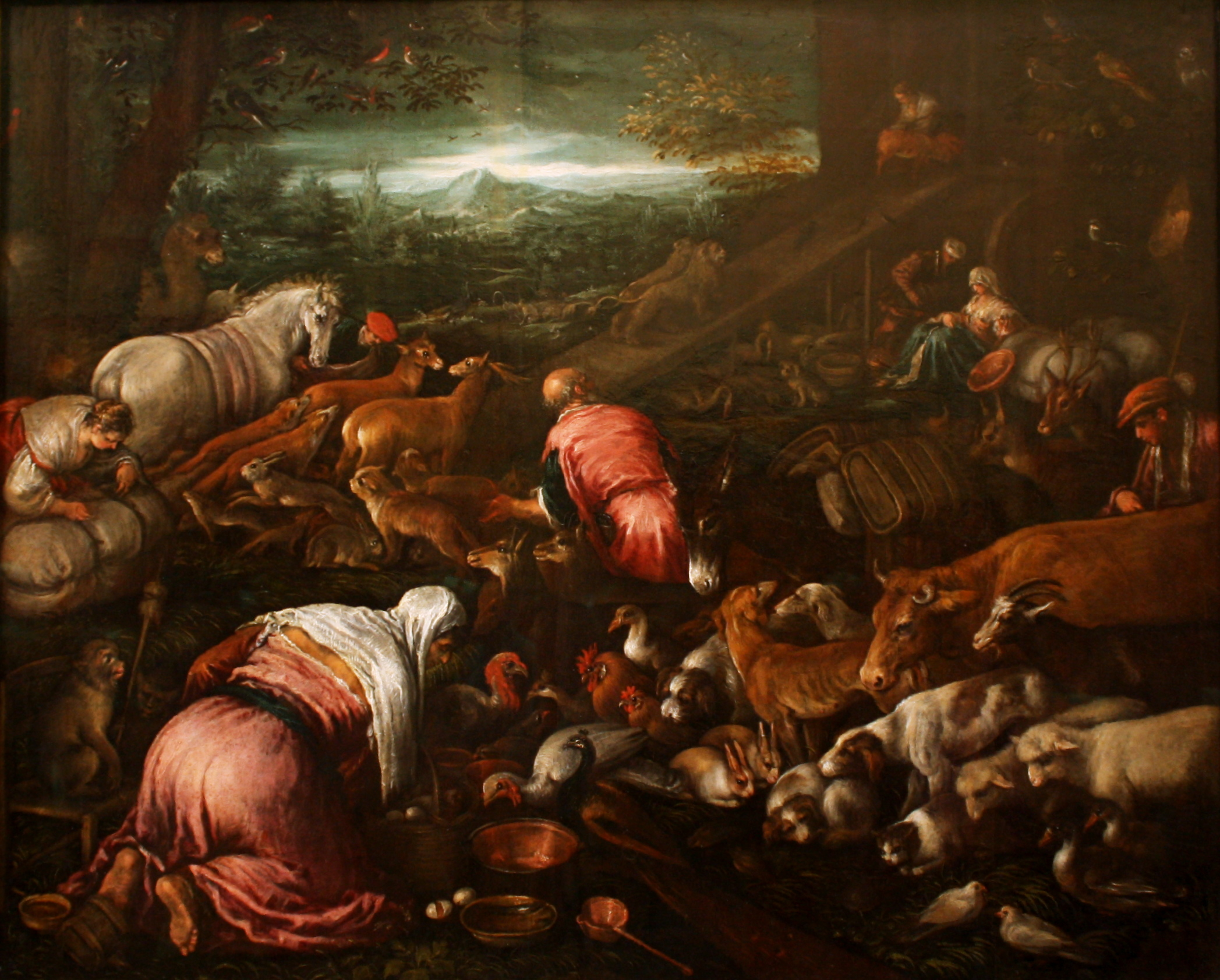
Animals boarding Noah's Ark, by Jacopo Bassano's workshop, late 16th century

Reading in Genesis 7:10 that "it came to pass, after seven days, that the waters of the Flood were upon the earth," the Gemara asked what the nature of these seven days was (that God delayed the Flood on their account). Rav taught that these were the days of mourning for Methuselah, and thus that lamenting the righteous postpones retribution. Another explanation is that during "the seven days" God reversed the order of nature (בְּרֵאשִׁית, bereishit) (established at the beginning of creation), and the sun rose in the west and set in the east (so that sinners might be shocked into repentance). Another explanation is that God first appointed for them a long time (the 120 years to which Genesis 6:3 alludes), and then a short time (a seven-day grace period in which to repent). Another explanation is that during "the seven days," God gave them a foretaste of the world to come, so that they might know the nature of the rewards of which they were depriving themselves.

Similarly, the Jerusalem Talmud linked "the seven days" in Genesis 7:10 to the law of seven days of mourning for the death of a relative (שִׁבְעָה, shivah). Rabbi Jacob bar Aḥa taught in the name of Rabbi Zorah that the command to Aaron in Leviticus 8:35, "at the door of the tent of meeting shall you abide day and night seven days, and keep the charge of the Lord," served as a source for the law of shivah. Rabbi Jacob bar Aḥa interpreted Moses to tell Aaron that just as God observed seven days of mourning for the then-upcoming destruction of the world at the time of the Flood of Noah, so too Aaron would observe seven days of mourning for the upcoming death of his sons Nadab and Abihu. And we know that God observed seven days of mourning for the destruction of the world by the Flood from Genesis 7:10, which says, "And it came to pass after the seven days, that the waters of the Flood were upon the earth." The Gemara asked whether one mourns before a death, as Jacob bar Aḥa appears to argue happened in these two cases. In reply, the Gemara distinguished between the mourning of God and people: People, who do not know what will happen until it happens, do not mourn until the deceased dies. But God, who knows what will happen in the future, mourned for the world before its destruction. The Gemara noted, however, that there are those who say that the seven days before the Flood were days of mourning for Methuselah (who died just before the Flood).

A midrash taught that God kept seven days of mourning before God brought the Flood, as Genesis 7:10 reports, "And it came to pass after the seven days, that the waters of the flood were upon the earth." The midrash deduced that God was mourning by noting that Genesis 6:6 reports, "And it repented the Lord that He had made man on the earth, and it grieved Him (וַיִּתְעַצֵּב, vayitatzeiv) at His heart." And 2 Samuel 19:3 uses the same word to express mourning when it says, "The king grieves (נֶעֱצַב, ne'etzav) for his son."

==== Debate around Genesis 7:11 ====
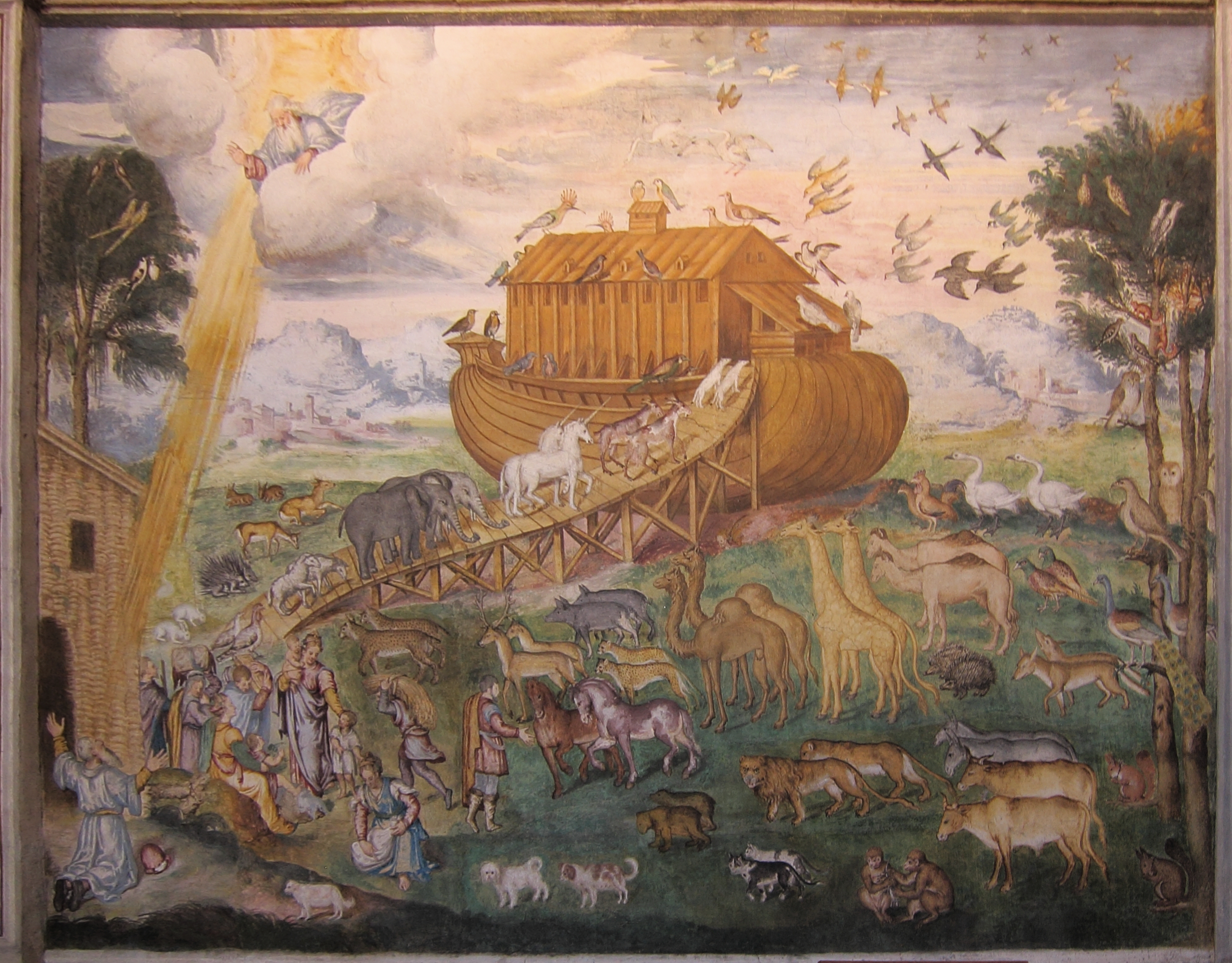
Rising in Noah's ark, Aurelio Luini, circa 1556

Rabbi Joshua and Rabbi Eliezer differed about when the events took place in Genesis 7:11, where it says, "In the sixth hundredth year of Noah's life, in the second month, on the seventeenth day of the month." Rabbi Joshua taught that the events of Genesis 7:11 took place on the seventeenth day of Iyar, when the constellation of the Pleiades sets at daybreak and the fountains begin to dry up. Because the generation of the Flood perverted its ways (from the way of creation), God changed for them the work of creation and made the constellation of the Pleiades rise at daybreak. God took two stars from the Pleiades and brought the Flood on the world. Rabbi Eliezer, however, taught that the events of Genesis 7:11 took place on the seventeenth of Cheshvan, a day on which the constellation of the Pleiades rises at daybreak, and the season when the fountains begin to fill. Because the generation of the Flood perverted its ways (from the way of creation), God changed for them the work of creation and caused the constellation of the Pleiades to rise at daybreak. God took away two stars from it and brought the Flood on the world. If one accepts the view of Rabbi Joshua, then one can understand why Genesis 7:11 speaks of the "second month" (to describe Iyar, because Exodus 12:2 describes Nisan as the first month, and Iyar follows Nisan). If one accepts Rabbi Eliezer's view, the "second month" means the month that is second to the Day of Judgment (Rosh Hashanah, which Deuteronomy 11:12 recognizes as the beginning of a year when it says, "The eyes of the Lord are upon it (the Land of Israel) from the beginning of the year"). If one accepts Rabbi Joshua's view, the change in the work of creation was the change in the constellation and the waters. If one accepts Rabbi Eliezer's view, the Gemara asked what change there was in the natural order (as the constellation usually rose at that time and that time of year is usually the rainy season). The Gemara found the answer in the dictum of Rabbi Ḥisda, when he said that with hot passion they sinned, and with hot waters they were punished. The rabbis taught in a baraita that the sages of Israel follow Rabbi Eliezer in dating the Flood (counting Rosh Hashanah as the beginning of the year and Cheshvan as the "second month") and Rabbi Joshua in dating the annual cycles (holding that God created the world in Nisan). The scholars of other peoples, however, follow Rabbi Joshua in dating the Flood as well.

Rabbi Joḥanan taught that because the corruption of the generation of the Flood was great, their punishment was also great. Genesis 6:5 characterizes their corruption as great (רַבָּה, rabbah), saying, "And God saw that the wickedness of man was great in the earth." And Genesis 7:11 characterizes their punishment as great (רַבָּה, rabbah), saying, "on the same day were all the fountains of the great deep broken up." Rabbi Joḥanan reported that three of those great thermal fountains remained open after the Flood—the gulf of Gaddor, the hot-springs of Tiberias, and the great well of Biram.

=== In medieval Jewish interpretation ===
Maimonides taught that although the two Hebrew nouns אִישׁ, ish, and אִישָׁהּ, ishah, were originally employed to designate the "male" and "female" of human beings, they were afterwards applied to the "male" and "female" of other species of the animal creation. Thus, in Genesis 7:2, "Of every clean beast you shall take seven and seven, each with his mate (אִישׁ וְאִשְׁתּוֹ, ish ve-ishto)," the words אִישׁ וְאִשְׁתּוֹ, ish ve-ishto mean "male and female" of those animals.

== Third reading—Genesis 7:17–8:14 ==
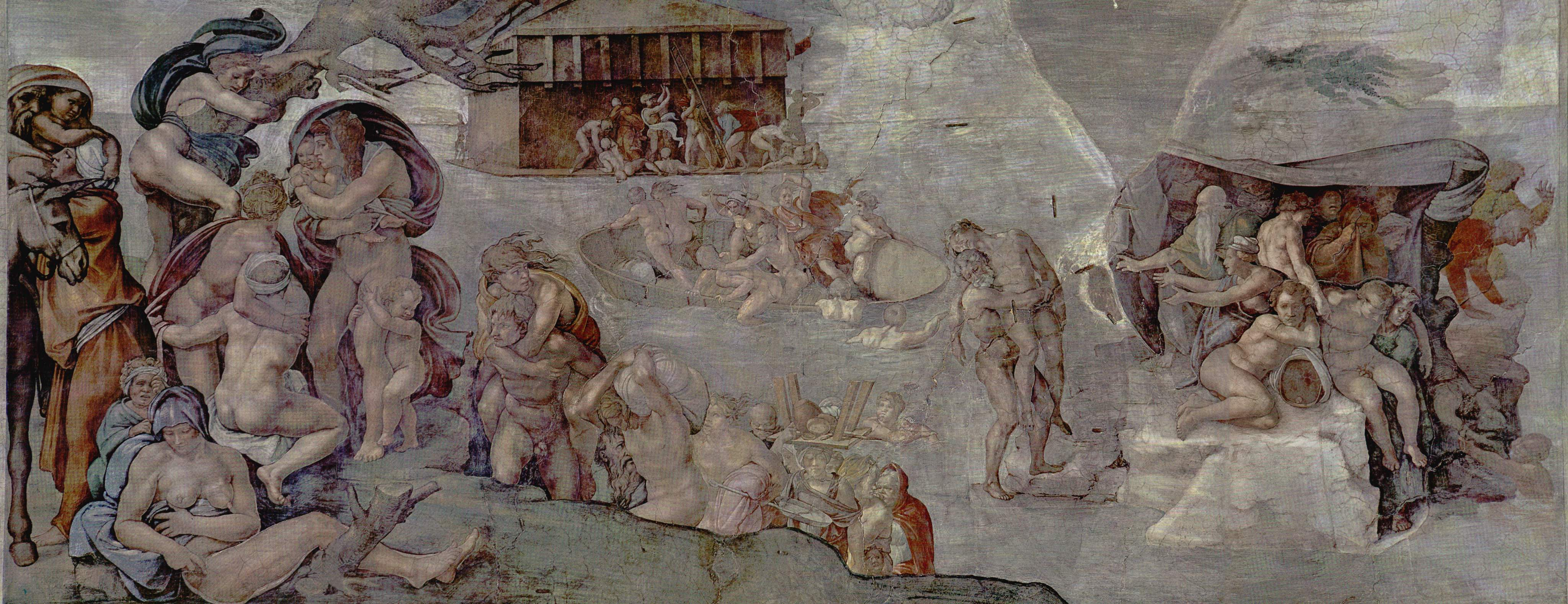
Noah's Ark floats in the background while people struggle to escape the rising water of the Flood (fresco c. 1508–1512 by Michelangelo in the Sistine Chapel)

In the third reading, the rains fell 40 days and 40 nights, the waters swelled 15 cubits above the highest mountains, (Note: About 22 feet (6.7 m).) and all flesh with the merest breath of life died, except for Noah and those with him on the Ark. When the waters had swelled 150 days, God remembered Noah and the beasts, and God caused a wind to blow and the waters to recede steadily from the earth, and the Ark came to rest on the mountains of Ararat.

Forty days after the tops of the mountains were seen, Noah opened the window and sent out a raven, and it went to and fro. Then he sent out a dove to see if the waters had decreased from the ground, but the dove could not find a resting place, and returned to the Ark. He waited another seven days, and again sent out the dove, and the dove came back toward evening with an olive leaf. He waited another seven days and sent out the dove, and it did not return. When Noah removed the covering of the Ark, he saw that the ground had dried. The third reading and a closed portion end here.

=== In classical rabbinic interpretation ===
==== Generational difference ====
The Mishnah concluded that the generation of the Flood and the generation of the dispersion after the Tower of Babel were both so evil as to have no share in the world to come. Rabbi Akiva deduced from the words of Genesis 7:23 that the generation of the Flood will have no portion in the world to come; he read the words "and every living substance was destroyed" to refer to this world and the words "that was on the face of the ground" to refer to the next world. Rabbi Judah ben Bathyra deduced from the words "My spirit will not always enter into judgment with man" of Genesis 6:3 that God will neither revive nor judge the generation of the Flood on Judgment Day.

==== The temperature of the water ====
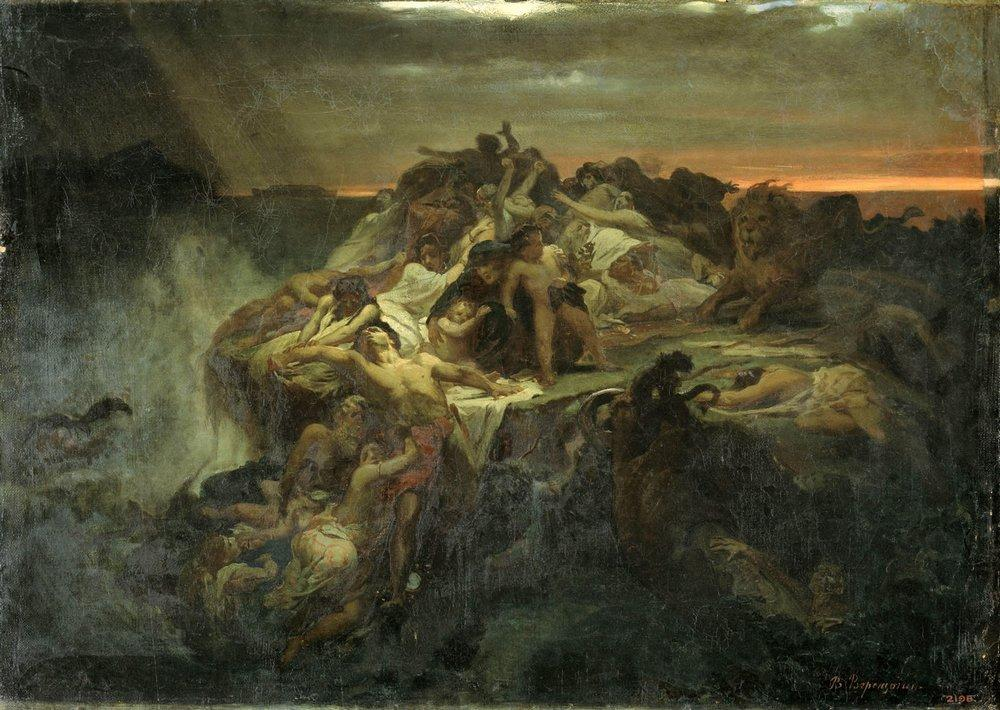
The Deluge (1869 painting by Wassilij Petrovich Wereschtschagin)

According to the Pirke De-Rabbi Eliezer, Noah warned the generation of the Flood to turn from their evil deeds, so that God would not bring the Flood upon them. But they told Noah that if God brought the Flood, they were so tall that the waters would not reach up to their necks, and their feet could plug up the depths. So they placed their feet to close all the depths. So God heated the waters of the deep so that they rose and burnt their flesh, and peeled off their skin, as Job 6:17 says, "What time they wax warm, they vanish; when it is hot, they are consumed out of their place."

A baraita interpreted Job 12:5 to teach that the waters of the Flood were as hot and viscous as bodily fluids. And Rav Ḥisda taught that since it was with hot passion that they sinned, it was with hot water that they were punished. For Genesis 8:1 says, "And the water cooled" (יָּשֹׁכּוּ, yashoku, more often translated as 'abated'), and Esther 7:10 says, "Then the king's wrath cooled down" (שָׁכָכָה, shachachah).

==== The question of water levels ====
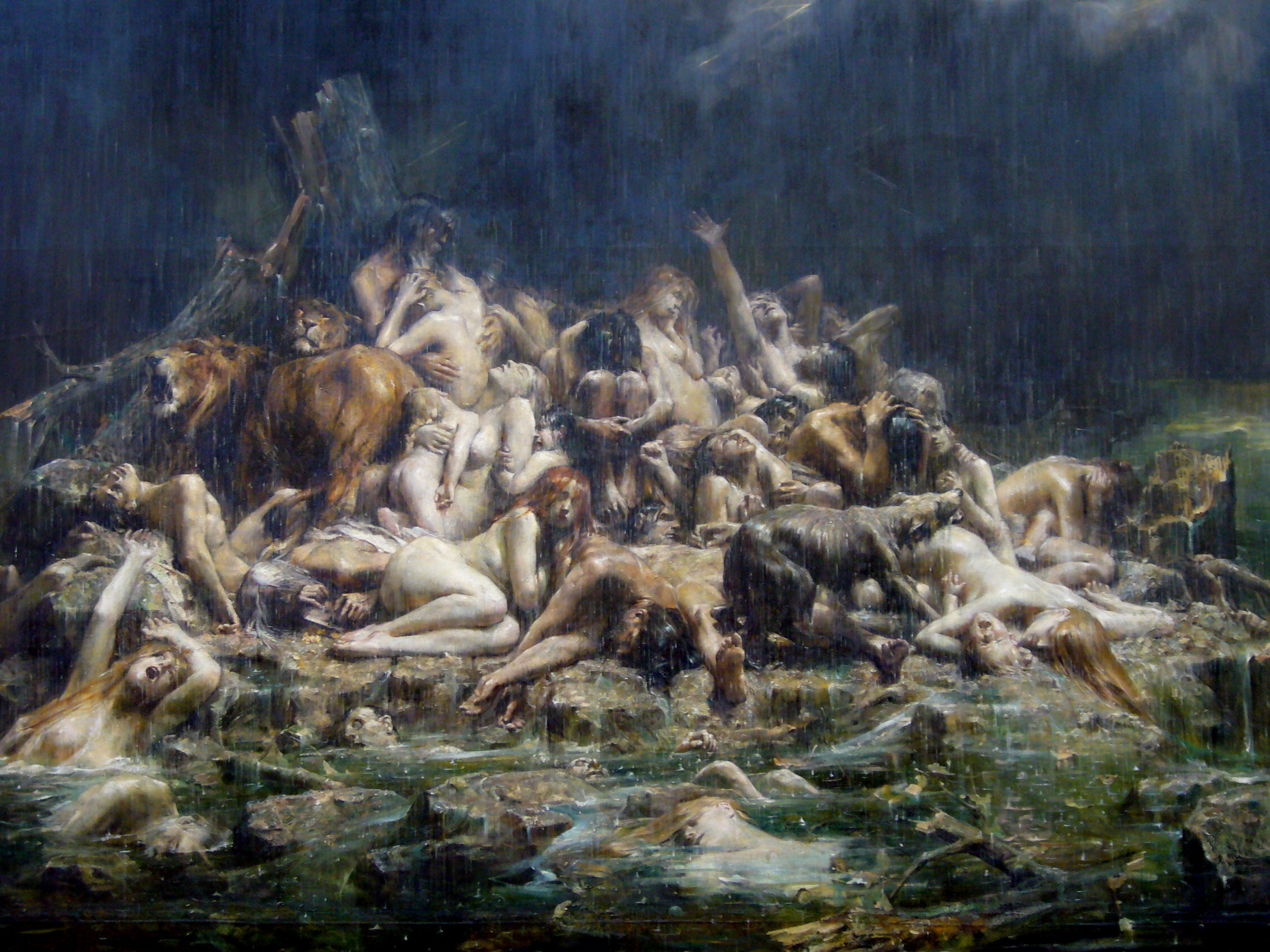
The Deluge (late 19th-century painting by Léon Comerre)

In a baraita, Rabbi Eleazar of Modi'im interpreted Genesis 7:22, "Fifteen cubits upward did the waters prevail; and the mountains were covered." Rabbi Eleazar of Modi'im asked whether waters that measured fifteen cubits high on the mountains could also measure fifteen cubits in the valley. To do so, the waters would have to stand like a series of walls (terraced with the topography). And if so, the ark could not have come to rest on the top of the mountains. Rather, Rabbi Eleazar of Modi'im taught that all the fountains of the great deep came up first until the water was even with the mountains, and then the water rose fifteen more cubits.

==== On how the purge was delivered ====
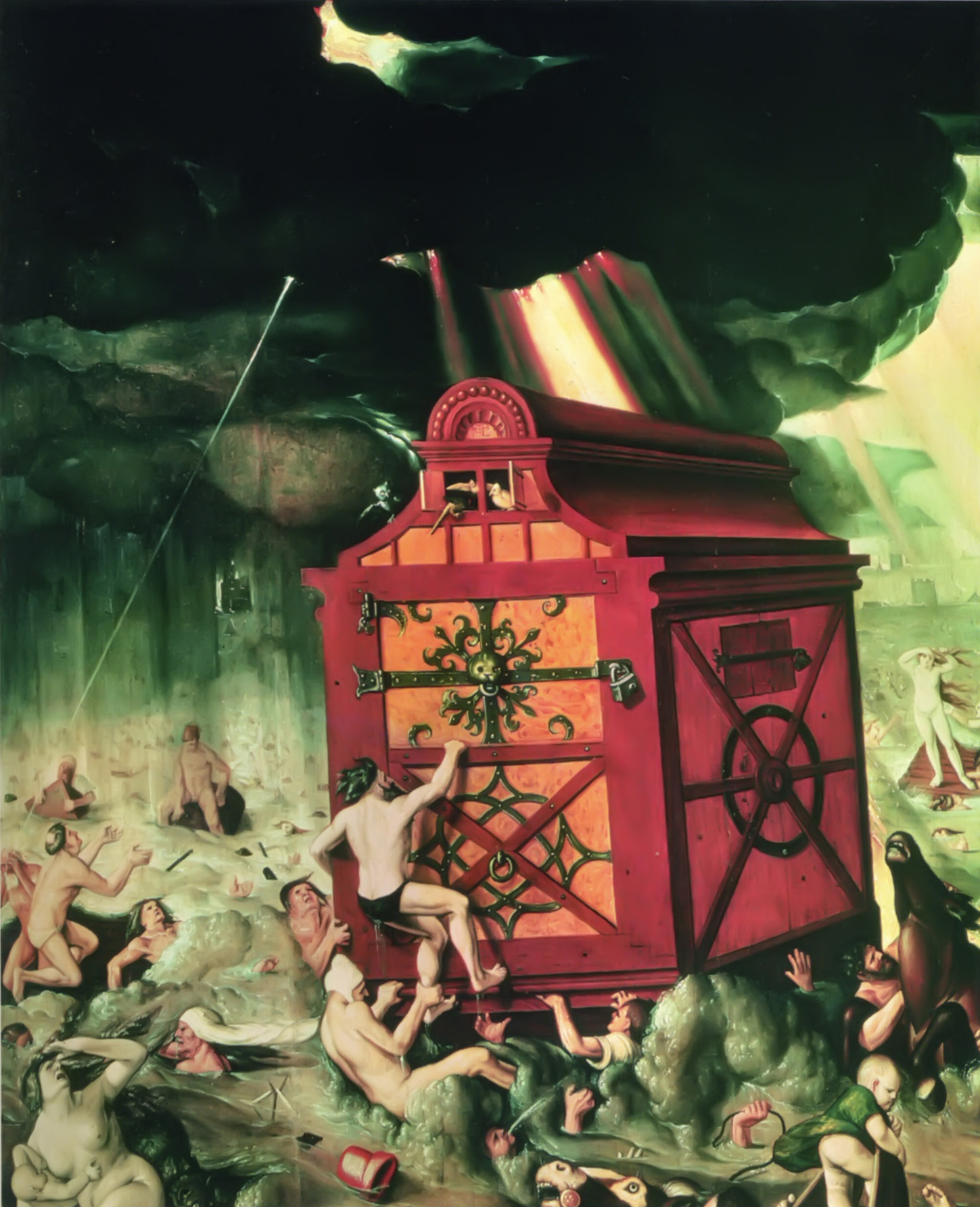
The Flood (1516 painting by Hans Baldung)

Reading in Genesis 7:22 that "all that was on the dry land died," the Gemara deduced that the fish in the sea did not die (apparently not having committed the transgressions that land animals had).

The Tosefta taught that the Flood killed people before animals (as seen in the order of Genesis 7:23), because man sinned first (as shown in Genesis 6:5).

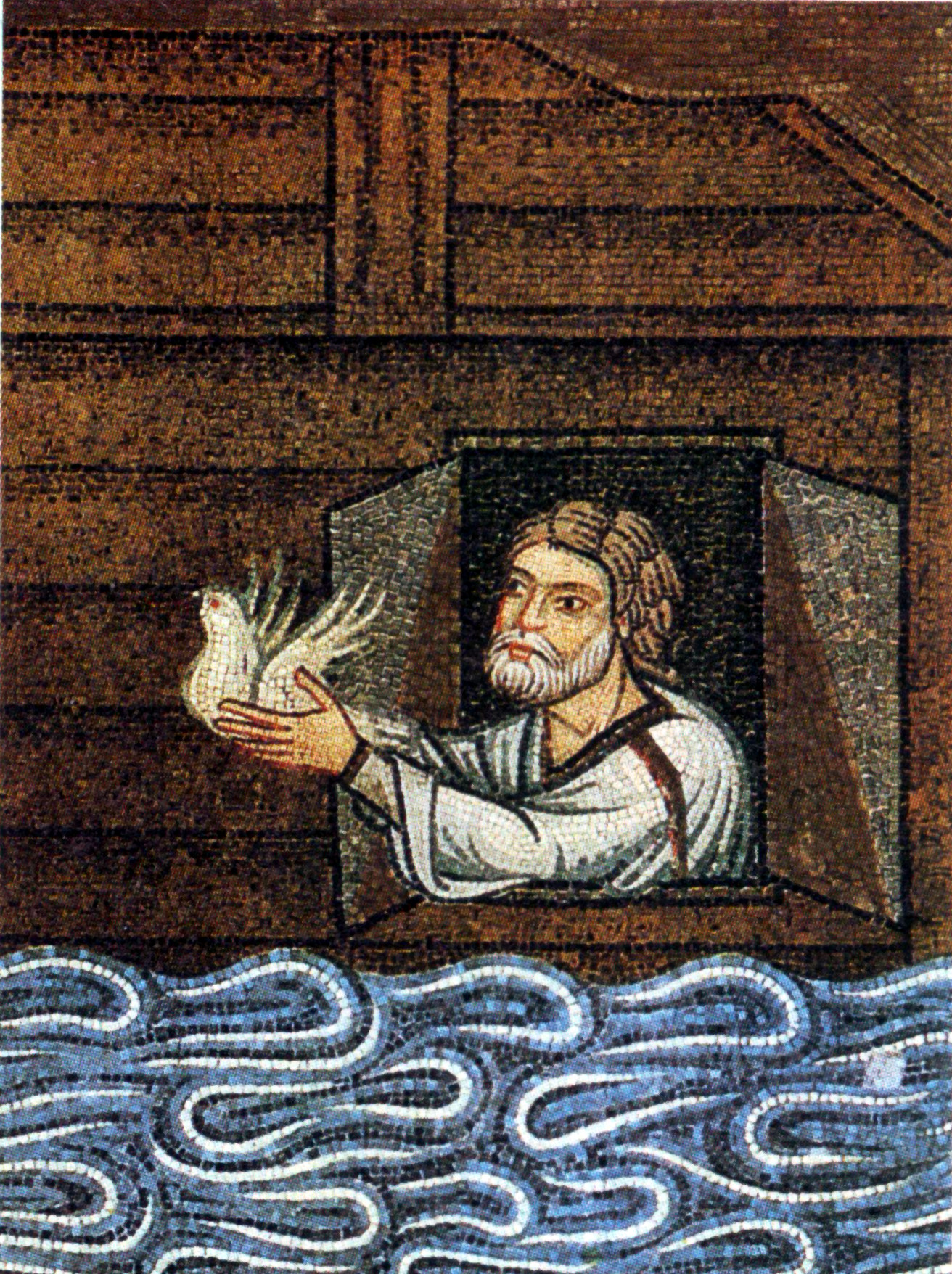
Noah and the Dove (mosaic circa 12th–13th century in St Mark's Basilica, Venice)

Rabbi taught that, in conferring honor, the Bible commences with the greatest, in cursing with the least important. With regard to cursing, the Gemara reasoned that Rabbi must have meant the punishment of the Flood, as Genesis 7:23 says, "And He blotted out every living substance which was upon the face of the ground, both man and cattle," starting with the people before the cattle.

Reading in Genesis 7:23 that "every living substance was destroyed that was upon the face of the ground"—people and animals alike—the Gemara asked how the beasts had sinned (to deserve this punishment). A baraita on the authority of Rabbi Joshua ben Karḥa compared this to a father who set up a bridal canopy for his son and prepared a banquet with every sort of food. But then his son died. So the father broke up the canopy, saying that he had prepared it only for his son. Now that the son was dead, the father had no need for a banquet. Thus, God created the animals only for the benefit of people. Now that people had sinned, God had no need for the animals.

==== Noah as common ancestor of non jews and jews ====
The Mishnah taught that those who vow not to benefit from the children of Noah may not benefit from non-Jews, but may benefit from Jews. The Gemara asked how Jews could be excluded from the "children of Noah," as Genesis 7:23 indicates that all humanity descended from Noah. The Gemara answered that since God singled out Abraham, Jews are considered descendants of Abraham.

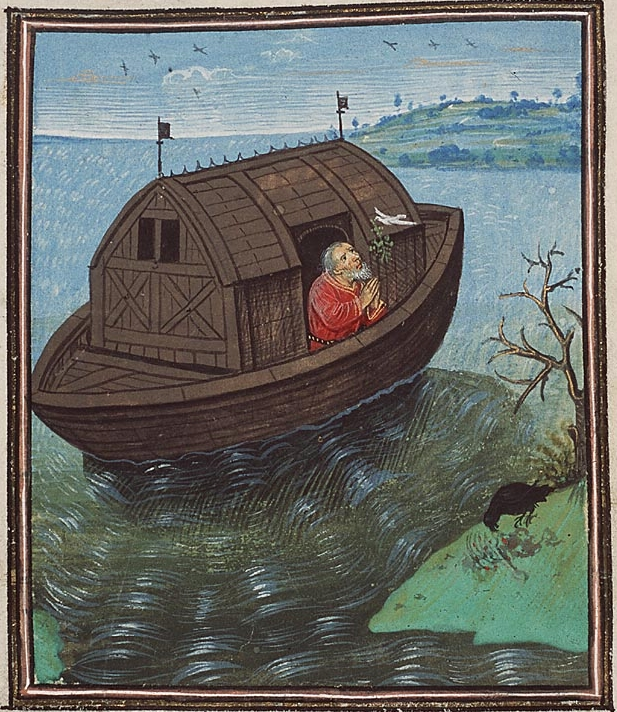
Noah sends off a dove from the Ark (miniature on vellum by Jean Dreux circa 1450–1460 at the Museum Meermanno-Westreenianum, The Hague)

==== The raven ====
Reading "and he sent forth a raven" in Genesis 8:7, Resh Lakish taught that the raven gave Noah a triumphant retort, arguing that both God and Noah must have hated the raven. It was evident that God hated the raven because God commanded Noah to save seven pairs of the clean creatures on the Ark, but only two of the unclean (among which the raven counted itself under Leviticus 11:15). And it was evident that Noah hated the raven because Noah had left in the Ark the species of which there were seven pairs and sent one of which there were only two. If the angel of heat or cold had smitten the raven, the world would have been missing the raven's kind.

Similarly, interpreting the words, "and it went forth to and fro" in Genesis 8:7, Rabbi Judan said in the name of Rabbi Judah ben Rabbi Simon that the raven began arguing with Noah. The raven asked Noah why of all the birds that Noah had in the Ark Noah sent none but the raven. Noah retorted that the world had no need of the raven; the raven was fit neither for food nor for sacrifice. Rabbi Berekiah said in Rabbi Abba's name that God told Noah to take that back, because the world would need ravens in the future. Noah asked God when the world would need ravens. God replied that (in the words of Genesis 8:7) "when the waters dry off from on the earth," a righteous man (Elijah) would arise and dry up the world (threatening drought, and then see the threat fulfilled). And God would cause him to have need of ravens, as 1 Kings 17:6 reports, "And the ravens (עֹרְבִים, orvim) brought him bread and flesh." Rabbi Judah maintained that the word orvim (עֹרְבִים) referred to a town within the borders of Bashan called Arbo. But Rabbi Nehemiah insisted that 1 Kings 17:6 literally meant ravens, and the ravens brought Elijah food from King Jehoshaphat's table.

==== The dove ====
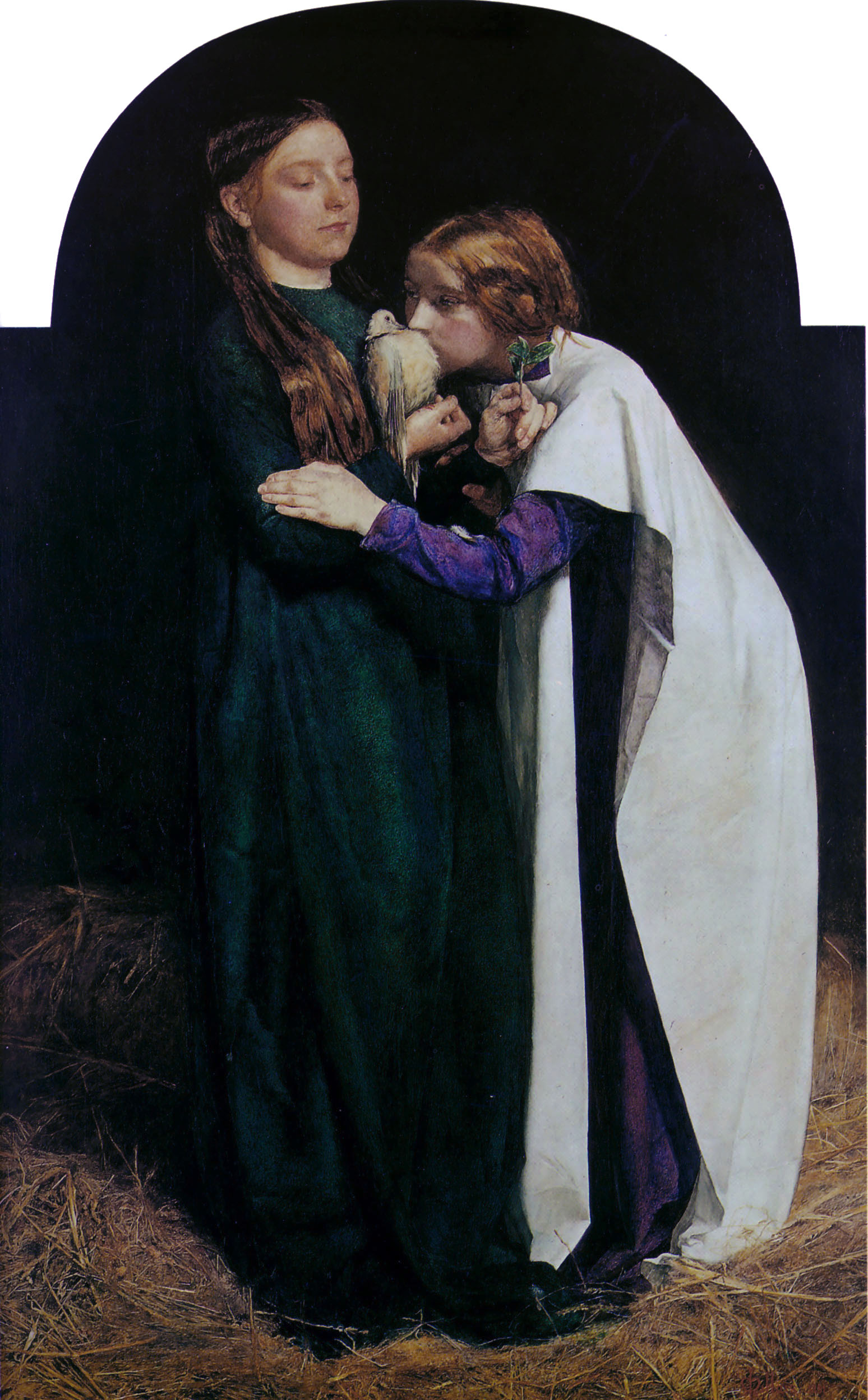
The Return of the Dove to the Ark (1851 painting by John Everett Millais)

From the discussion of the dove in Genesis 8:8, Rabbi Jeremiah deduced that the clean fowl lived with the righteous people on the Ark. (Of the raven, Genesis 8:7 says, "he sent forth a raven." But of the dove, Genesis 8:8 says, "he sent forth a dove from him" indicating that the dove was with him.)

Reading of the dove in Genesis 8:11, "and lo, in her mouth was an olive leaf," a midrash asked where the dove found it. Rabbi Abba taught that the dove brought it from the young shoots of the Land of Israel. Rabbi Levi taught that the dove brought it from the Mount of Olives, for the Flood had not submerged the Land of Israel. Thus God told Ezekiel (in Ezekiel 22:24): "Son of man, say to her: 'You are a land that is not cleansed, nor rained upon on the day of indignation.'" Rabbi Birai (or some say Rabbi Berekiah) taught that the gates of the Garden of Eden were opened for the dove, and from there the dove brought the olive leaf. Rabbi Abbahu asked if the dove had brought it from the Garden of Eden, would the dove not have brought something better, like cinnamon or a balsam leaf. But in fact, the dove was giving Noah a hint, saying to him in effect that better is bitterness from God than sweetness from Noah's hand.

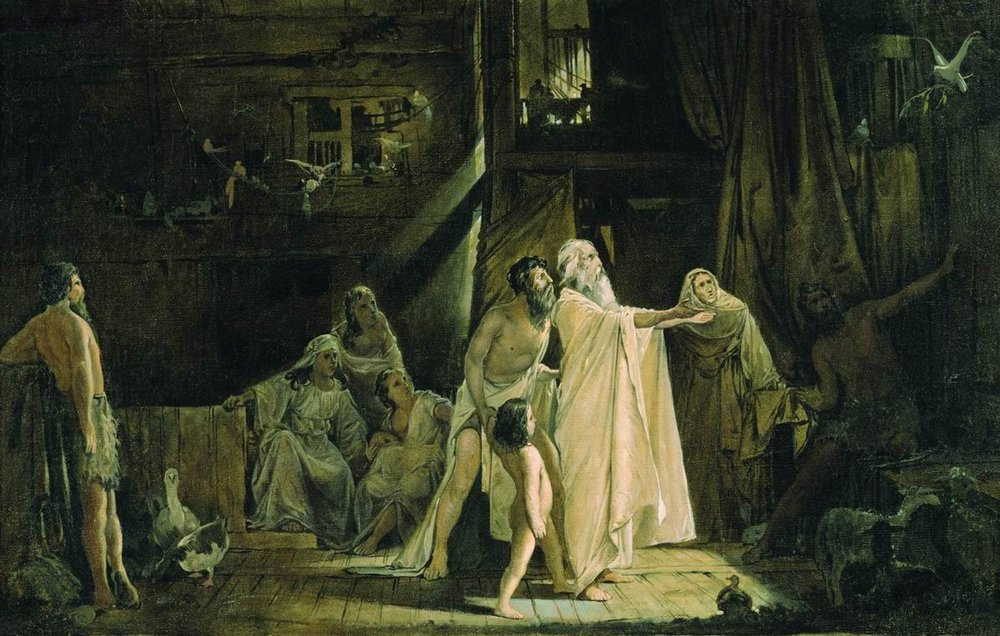
Noah's Ark (1882 painting by Andrei Ryabushkin at the State Russian Museum, Saint Petersburg)

Similarly, reading of the dove in Genesis 8:11, "and lo, in her mouth was an olive leaf," Rabbi Eleazar (or others say Rabbi Jeremiah ben Eleazar) taught that the dove prayed to God that God might let the dove's sustenance be as bitter as the olive but given by God, rather than sweet as honey and given by flesh and blood (upon whom the dove was therefore dependent).

=== In medieval Jewish interpretation ===
The Zohar teaches that the waters did not touch the Land of Israel, that is, Jerusalem.

Reading Genesis 8:1, "And God remembered Noah," Saadia Gaon taught that Scripture designates the deliverance of the human world from a painful situation as a recollection on the part of God. Saadia argued that the verse does not permit the use of the term "forgetfulness" in connection with God's desisting from delivering God's creatures.

== Fourth reading—Genesis 8:15–9:7 ==
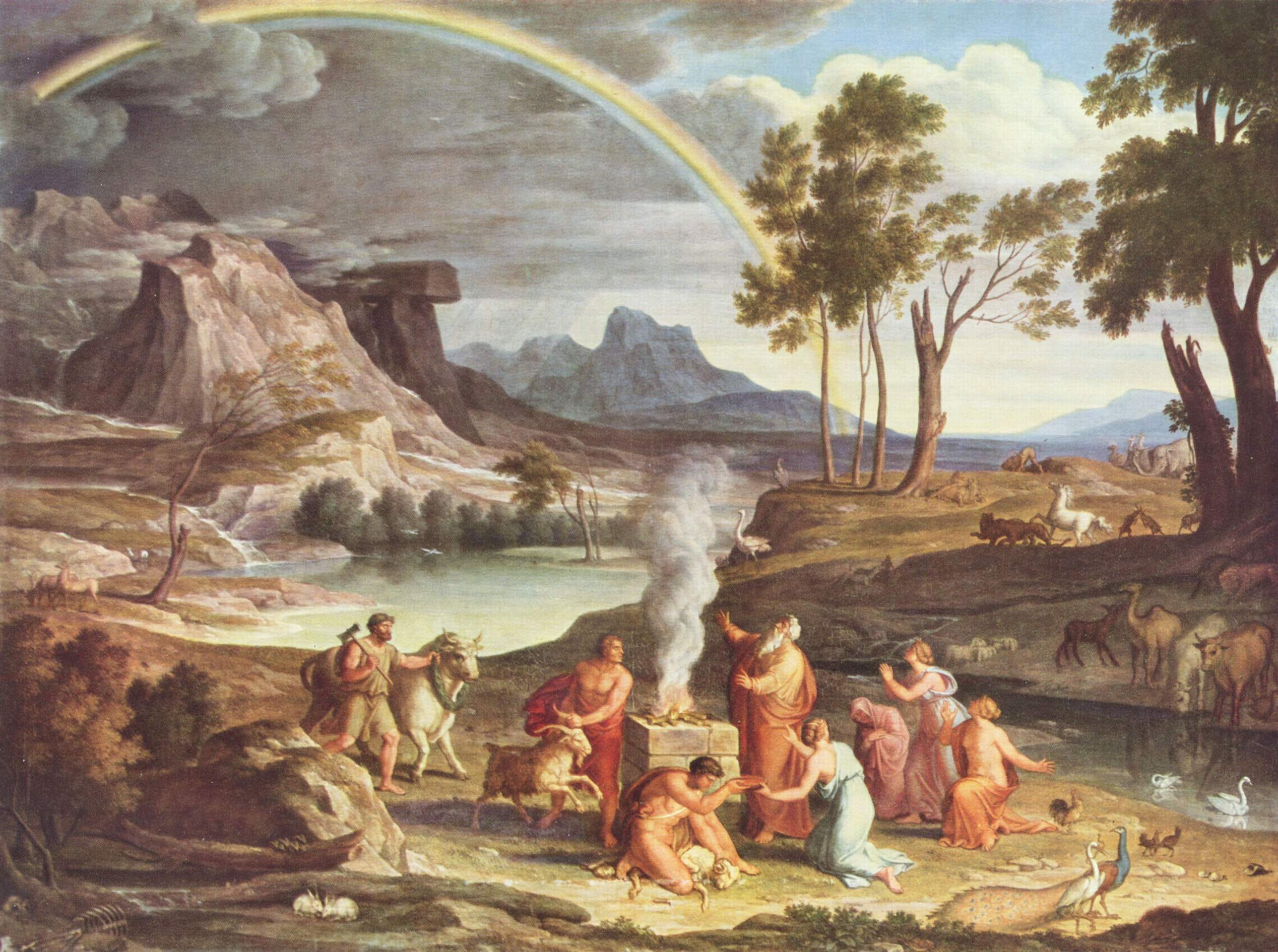
Landscape with Noah's Thank Offering (painting c. 1803 by Joseph Anton Koch)

In the fourth reading, God told Noah to come out of the Ark with his family and to free the animals. Then Noah built an altar to God and offered burnt offerings of every clean animal and of every clean bird. God smelled the pleasing odor and vowed never again to doom the earth because of humankind, as human imaginings are evil from their youth, but God would preserve the seasons so long as the earth endured. God blessed Noah and his sons, telling them to be fertile and increase, and put the fear of them into all the beasts, which God gave into their hands to eat. God prohibited eating flesh with its life-blood in it. God would require a reckoning of every person's and beast's life-blood, and whoever shed the blood of a human would have their blood shed by humans, for in God's image did God make humankind. God told them again to be fertile and increase. The fourth reading and a closed portion end here.

=== In classical rabbinic interpretation ===
==== Unloading the ark ====
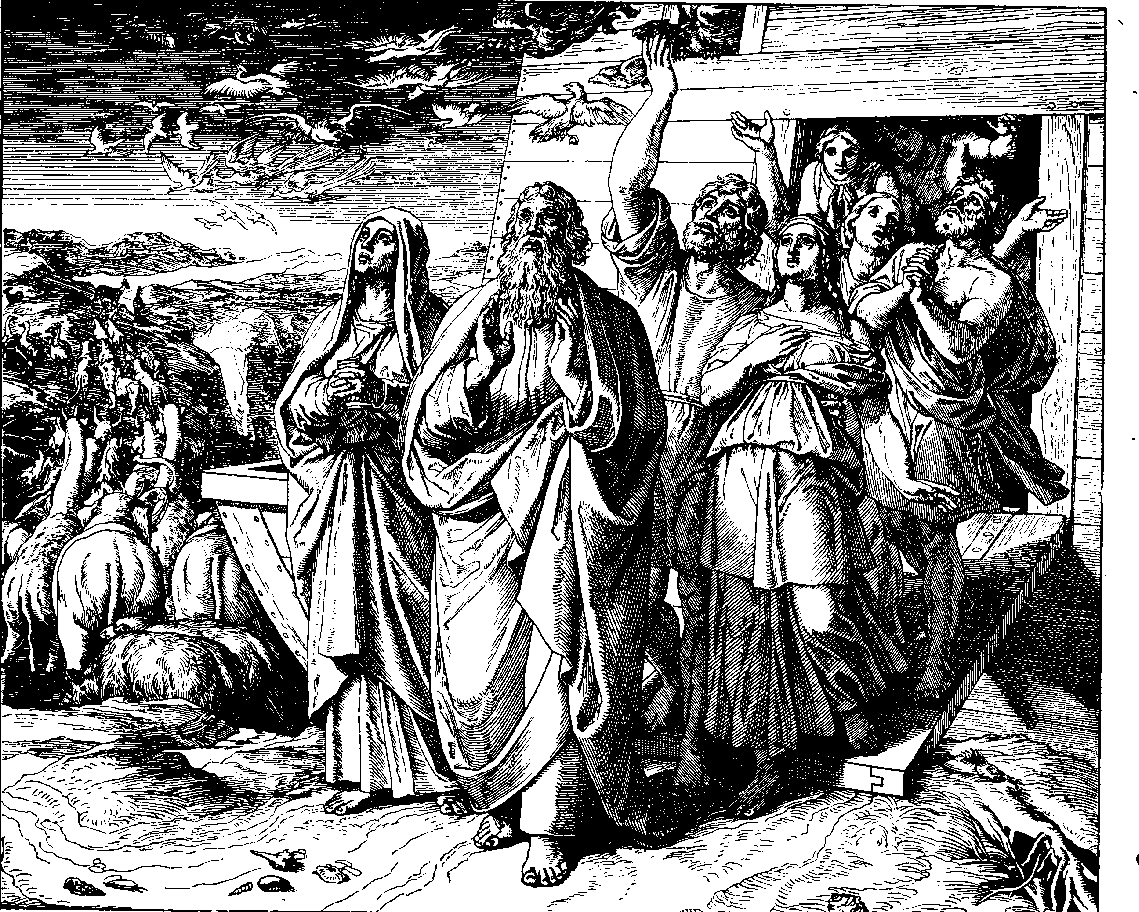
The Ark Rests upon Ararat (woodcut by Julius Schnorr von Carolsfeld from the 1860 Die Bibel in Bildern)

A midrash taught that when Psalm 142:8 says, "Bring my soul out of prison," it refers to Noah's imprisonment 12 months in the Ark, and when Psalm 142:8 says, "for You will deal bountifully with me," it refers to God's bounty to Noah when God told Noah in Genesis 8:16, "Go forth from the Ark."

Rabbi Joḥanan interpreted the words, "After their kinds they went forth from the Ark," in Genesis 8:19 to teach that the animals went out by their families, not alone. Rabbi Hana bar Bizna taught that Abraham's servant Eliezer once inquired of Noah's son Shem about these words in Genesis 8:19, asking Shem how his family managed. Shem replied that they had a difficult time in the Ark. During the day they fed the animals that usually fed by day, and during the night they fed those that normally fed by night. But Noah did not know what the chameleon ate. One day Noah was cutting a pomegranate, when a worm dropped out of it, and the chameleon ate it. From then on, Noah mashed up bran for the chameleon, and when the bran became wormy, the chameleon would eat. A fever struck the lion, so it lived off its reserves rather than eating other animals. Noah discovered the avarshinah bird (some say the phoenix bird) lying in the hold of the Ark and asked it if it needed food. The bird told Noah that it saw that Noah was busy and decided not to give him any more trouble. Noah replied by asking that it be God's will that the bird not perish, as Job 19:18 says, "Then I said: 'I shall die with my nest, and I shall multiply my days as the phoenix.'"

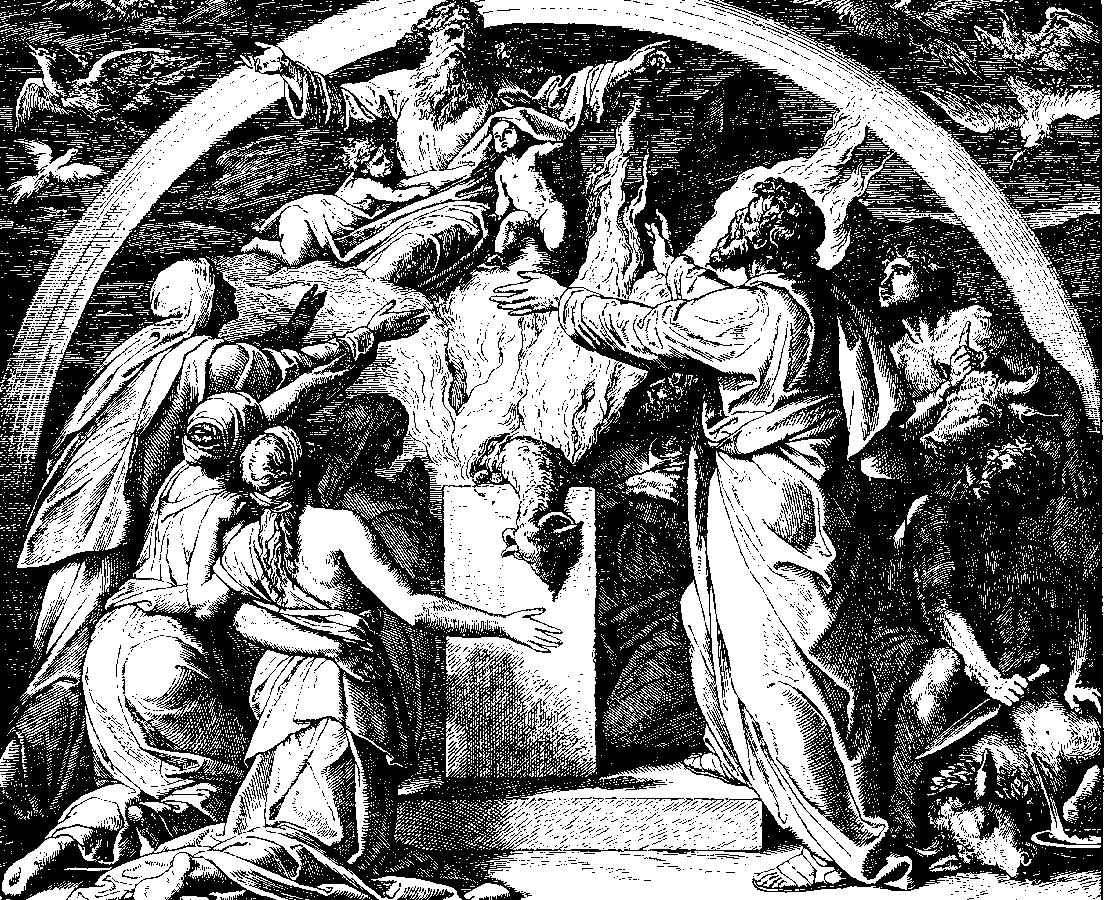
The Covenant of the Rainbow (woodcut by Julius Schnorr von Carolsfeld from the 1860 Die Bibel in Bildern)

A midrash recounted that Noah fed and provided for the Ark's inhabitants for all of 12 months. But Rav Huna said in Rabbi Liezer's name that when Noah was leaving the Ark, a lion nonetheless set on him and maimed him, so that he was not fit to offer sacrifices, and his son Shem sacrificed in his stead. The midrash took this as an application of the words of Proverbs 11:31: "the righteous shall be requited on earth; how much more the wicked and the sinner." From this, the midrash inferred that if despite his comparative righteousness, Noah was punished for his sins, "how much more" was the generation of the Flood.

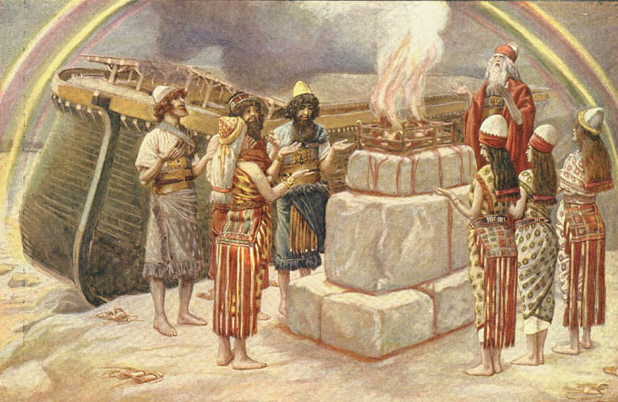
Noah's Sacrifice (watercolor circa 1896–1902 by James Tissot)

Rav Huna cited the report in Genesis 8:20 that Noah offered burnt offerings from every clean animal and bird to support the proposition in a baraita that all animals were eligible to be offered, as the words "animal" (בְּהֵמָה, behemah) and "bird" (עוֹף, of) refer to any animal or bird, and the term "animal" (בְּהֵמָה, behemah) includes wild beasts (חַיָה, hayyah).

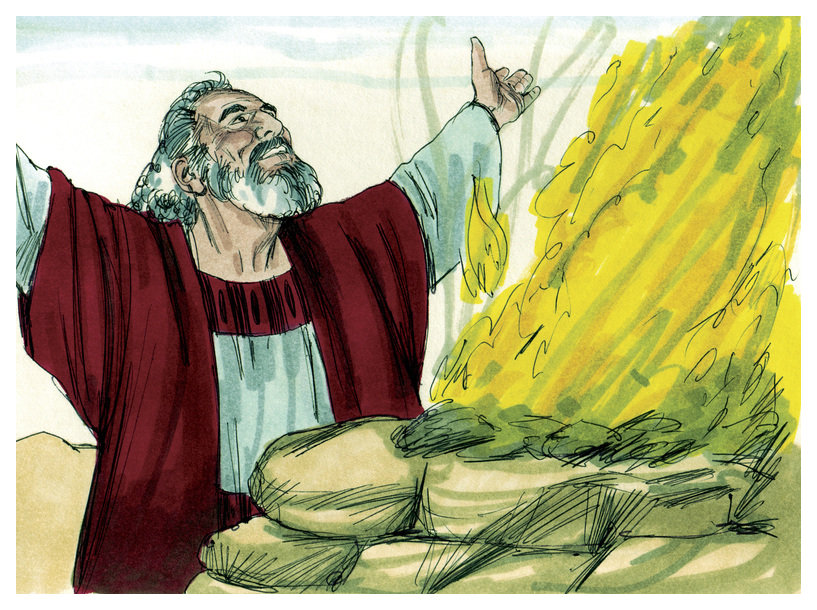
When Noah got off the ark, he built an altar to the Lord. (1984 illustration by Jim Padgett, courtesy of Sweet Publishing)

Rabbi Ḥaninah cited the report of Genesis 8:21 that "the Lord smelled the sweet savor; and ... said ... 'I will not again curse the ground any more for man's sake,'" for the proposition that those who allow themselves to be pacified when drinking wine possess some of the characteristics of the Creator.

==== The presence of yetzer hara post flood ====
Rav Awira (or some say Rabbi Joshua ben Levi) taught that the Evil Inclination (yetzer hara) has seven names. God called it "Evil" in Genesis 8:21, saying, "the imagination of man's heart is evil from his youth." Moses called it "the Uncircumcised" in Deuteronomy 10:16, saying, "Circumcise therefore the foreskin of your heart." David called it "Unclean" in Psalm 51:12; Solomon called it "the Enemy" in Proverbs 25:21–22; Isaiah called it "the Stumbling-Block" in Isaiah 57:14; Ezekiel called it "Stone" in Ezekiel 36:26; and Joel called it "the Hidden One" in Joel 2:20.

The rabbis taught in a baraita that the Evil Inclination is hard to bear, since even God its Creator called it evil, as in Genesis 8:21, God says, "the desire of man's heart is evil from his youth."

In the Jerusalem Talmud, some questioned whether very young children have evil thoughts, but Rabbi Abbahu replied by quoting Genesis 8:21 to show that children's thoughts are evil. And Rabbi Judan read Genesis 8:21 to show that human thoughts are evil from their awakening.

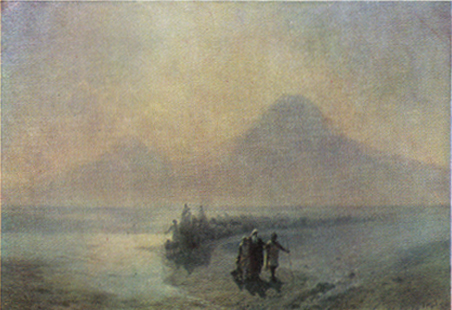
Noah Descending from Ararat (1889 painting by Ivan Aivazovsky)

==== Noahide laws and its applications ====
The rabbis interpreted Genesis 9 to set forth seven Noahide laws binding on all people: (1) to set up courts of justice, (2) not to commit idolatry, (3) not to commit blasphemy, (4) not to commit sexual immorality, (5) not to commit bloodshed (see Genesis 9:6), (6) not to commit robbery, and (7) not to eat flesh cut from a living animal (see Genesis 9:4). Rabbi Hanina taught that they were also commanded not to consume blood from a living animal. Rabbi Leazar taught that they were also commanded not to crossbreed animals. Rabbi Simeon taught that they were also commanded not to commit witchcraft. Rabbi Joḥanan taught that they were also commanded not to emasculate animals. And Rabbi Assi taught that the children of Noah were also prohibited to do anything stated in Deuteronomy 18:10–11: "There shall not be found among you any one that makes his son or his daughter to pass through the fire, one that uses divination, a soothsayer, or an enchanter, or a sorcerer, or a charmer, or one that consults a ghost or a familiar spirit, or a necromancer." The Tosefta instructed that Israelites should not tempt anyone to violate a Noahide law.

==== Fear ====
Rabbi Shimon ben Eleazar deduced from Genesis 9:2 that even a one-day-old child scares small animals but said that the corpse of even the giant Og of Bashan would need to be guarded from weasels and rats.

==== Dietary rules ====
Rabbi Tanhum ben Hanilai compared the laws of kashrut to the case of a physician who went to visit two patients, one whom the physician judged would live, and the other whom the physician judged would die. To the one who would live, the physician gave orders about what to eat and what not to eat. On the other hand, the physician told the one who would die to eat whatever the patient wanted. Thus, to the nations who were not destined for life in the World to Come, God said in Genesis 9:3, "Every moving thing that lives shall be food for you." But to Israel, whom God intended for life in the World to Come, God said in Leviticus 11:2, "These are the living things which you may eat."

The Gemara noted the paradox that mother's milk is kosher even though it is a product of the mother's blood, which, due to Genesis 9:4, is not kosher. In explanation, the Gemara quoted Job 14:4: “Who can bring a pure thing out of an impure? Is it not the One?” For God can bring a pure thing, such as milk, out of an impure thing, such as blood.

==== Differing opinions on Genesis 9:5 ====
It was taught in a baraita that Rabbi Eleazar interpreted the words of Genesis 9:5, "And surely your blood of your lives will I require," to mean that God will require retribution (in the Afterlife) from those who shed their own blood (by committing suicide).

Similarly, the Tosefta cited Genesis 9:5–6 for the proposition that just as one is liable for injury done to another, so is one liable for injury done to oneself. And Rabbi Simeon ben Eleazar said in the name of Rabbi Hilpai ben Agra, which he said in the name of Rabbi Joḥanan ben Nuri, that if one pulled out one's own hair, tore one's own clothing, broke one's utensils, or scattered one's coins, in a fit of anger, it should be seen as if that person did an act of service for an idol.

The midrash also read Genesis 9:5, "And surely (וְאַךְ, ve-ach) your blood of your lives will I require," to include one who strangles oneself. But the midrash taught that the principle of retribution for suicide did not apply to one in the plight of Saul (who committed suicide to save himself from the Philistines) or one like Hananiah, Mishael, and Azariah (who risked their lives to sanctify God's name), as the word אַךְ, ach implies a limitation on the general rule.

Rav Judah read the words of Genesis 9:5, "And surely your blood of your lives will I require," to teach that even a single judge could try a non-Jew (under the seven Noahide laws, as "will I require" is stated in the singular). A midrash read Genesis 9:5, "at the hand of every beast will I require it," to teach that when a murder is committed in secret, even if no one knows of it and a court cannot punish the murderer, still God will avenge the victim's blood.

Rabbi Akiva said that it demonstrated the value of human beings that God created us in God's image, and that it was an act of still greater love that God let us know (in Genesis 9:6) that God had created us in God's image. And Rabbi Akiva also said that whoever spills blood diminishes the Divine image. Rabbi Eleazar ben Azariah and Ben Azzai both said that whoever does not have children diminishes the Divine image as demonstrated by proximity of the notice that God created us in God's image (Genesis 9:6) and the command to be fruitful and multiply (Genesis 9:7). Similarly, a midrash taught that some say a man without a wife even impairs the Divine likeness, as Genesis 9:6 says, "For in the image of God made He man," and immediately thereafter Genesis 9:7 says, "And you, be fruitful, and multiply (implying that the former is impaired if one does not fulfill the latter).

=== In medieval Jewish interpretation ===
The Midrash ha-Ne'lam (The Midrash of the Concealed) told that when Noah left the Ark and saw the terrible destruction all around, he wept and cried out to God that God should have shown compassion for God's creatures. God called Noah a foolish shepherd and asked why Noah complained only then, and not when God told Noah in Genesis 7:1, "You have I seen righteous before Me in this generation"; or when in Genesis 6:17, God told Noah, "And I, behold, I do bring the flood of waters upon the earth, to destroy all flesh"; or when in Genesis 6:14, God told Noah, "Make an ark of gopher wood." God told Noah those things so that Noah would seek compassion for the world. But as soon as Noah heard that he would be saved in the Ark, the evil of the world did not touch his heart. Noah built the Ark and saved himself! Now that the world had been destroyed, Noah opened his mouth before God with prayers and supplications! When Noah realized his mistake, he offered sacrifices, as Genesis 8:20 says, "And Noah built an altar to the Lord; and took of every clean beast, and of every clean fowl, and offered burnt offerings on the altar." Similarly, the Midrash ha-Ne'lam contrasted Noah with the righteous heroes who arose for Israel afterward. Noah did not shield his generation and did not pray for them as Abraham did for his. For as soon as God told Abraham in Genesis 18:20, "the cry of Sodom and Gomorrah is great," immediately in Genesis 18:23, "Abraham drew near, and said." Abraham countered God with more and more words until he implored that if just ten righteous people were found there, God would grant atonement to the generation for their sake. Abraham thought that there were ten in the city, counting Lot and his wife, his daughters and sons-in-law, and that is why he beseeched no further.

Maimonides read Genesis 8:21 to refer to the evil inclination (yetzer ha-ra). Maimonides taught that the three terms—the adversary (הַשָּׂטָן, ha-satan), the evil inclination (yetzer ha-ra), and the angel of death—all designate the same thing. And actions ascribed to these three are in reality the actions of one and the same agent. Maimonides taught that the Hebrew term שָּׂטָן, satan was derived from the same root as the word שְׂטֵה, seteh, "turn away," as in Proverbs 4:15, and thus implies the notion of turning and moving away from a thing. Thus, the adversary turns people away from the way of truth and leads them astray in the way of error. Maimonides taught that the same idea is contained in Genesis 8:21, "And the imagination of the heart of man is evil from his youth." Maimonides reported that the sages also said that people receive the evil inclination at birth, for Genesis 4:7 says, "at the door sin crouches," and Genesis 8:21 says, "And the imagination of the heart of man is evil from his youth." The good inclination, however, is developed. Maimonides taught that the sages refer to the evil inclination and the good inclination when they tell that every person is accompanied by two angels, one on the right side and one on the left, one good and one bad.

Baḥya ibn Paquda argued that one proof in creation of God's existence is that out of God's abounding goodness to mankind, God put the fear of humans into dangerous wild creatures, as Genesis 9:2 says, "And the fear of you and the dread of you shall be upon every beast of the earth."

Saadia Gaon read Genesis 9:6, "Whoso sheds man's blood, by man shall his blood be shed," to explain why the death penalty was not imposed on Cain for killing Abel, for at the time of that murder, neither judge or witnesses yet existed to impose the penalty.

Maimonides cited Genesis 9:6 for the proposition that one who hires a murderer to kill another, one who sends one's servants and they kill another, one who binds another and leaves the other before a lion or the like to be killed, and one who commits suicide are all considered to be shedders of blood, and they are liable for death at the hands of God, but they are not liable for execution by the court. Maimonides reasoned that the words of Genesis 9:6, "When a person sheds the blood of a man, by a man his blood shall be shed," refer to one who personally kills another, without employing an agent. Maimonides read the words of Genesis 9:6, "Of the blood of your own lives I will demand an account," to refer to one who commits suicide. Maimonides read the words of Genesis 9:5, "From the hand of every wild beast will I demand an account," to refer to one who places another before a wild beast to be killed. And Maimonides read the words of Genesis 9:5, "From the hand of a man, from the hand of one's brother, will I demand an account for the soul of a man," to refer to one who hires others to kill another. In the last three instances, the verse uses the expression "will I demand an account," indicating that Heaven will execute their judgment.

=== In modern interpretation ===
Walter Brueggemann wrote that God's promise in Genesis 8:20–22 inverts the destructive action of the Flood story and marks the decisive end of the Genesis pre-history.

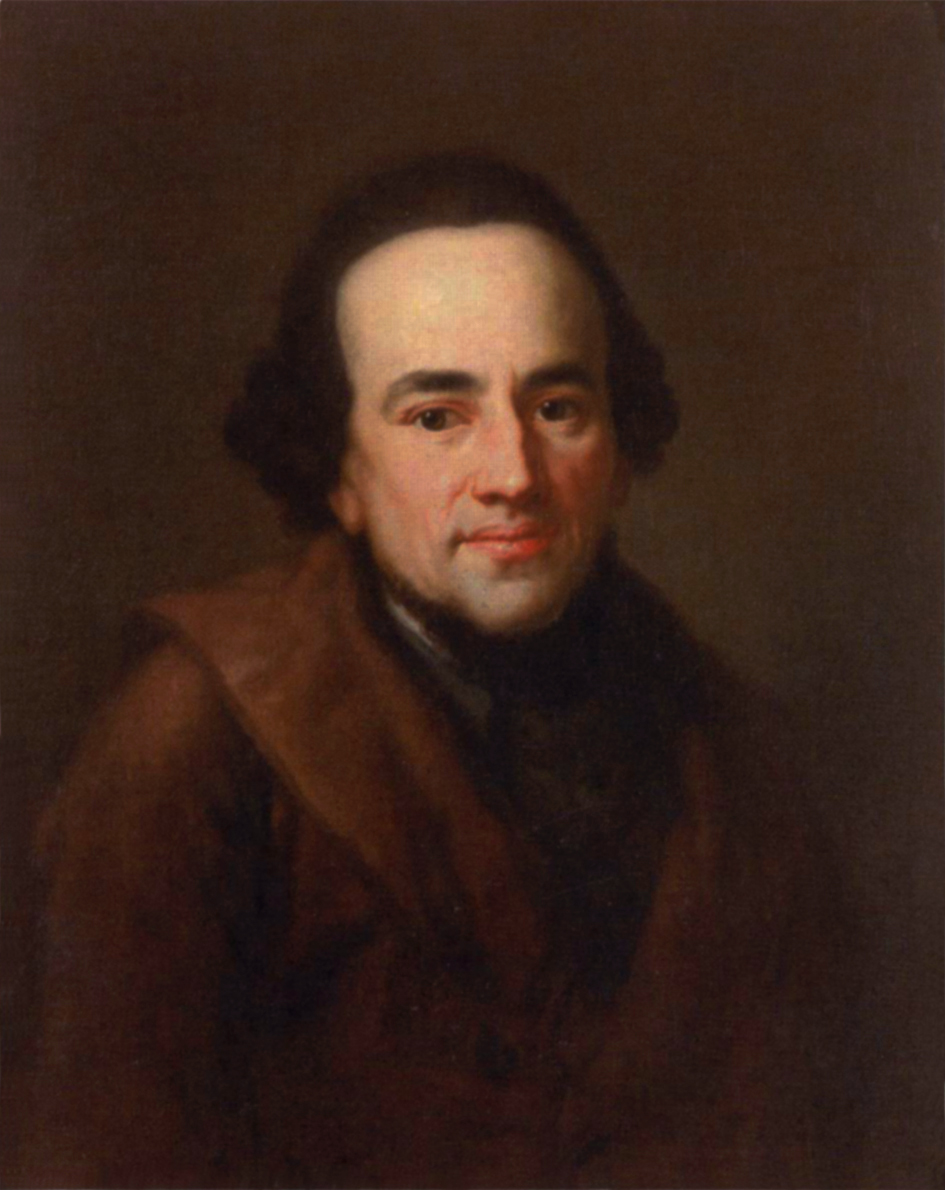
Mendelssohn

Moses Mendelssohn alluded to Genesis 9:6, "in the image of God made He man," in comparing church and state. Government and religion, Mendelssohn asserted, have for their object the promotion, by means of public measures, of human felicity in this life and in the life to come. Both act upon people's convictions and actions, on principles and their application; the state, by means of reasons based on the relations between people, or between people and nature, and religion by means of reasons based on the relations between people and God. The state treats people as the immortal children of the earth; religion treats people as the image of their Creator.

=== In inner-biblical interpretation ===
The food laws of Genesis 9:3–4 come in the wake of that in Genesis 1:29 and anticipate those of Leviticus 11 and Deuteronomy 14:3–21. The prohibition against consuming blood in Genesis 9:4 is echoed in Leviticus 3:17; 7:26; 17:10–12; Deuteronomy 12:23; 15:23.

== Fifth reading—Genesis 9:8–17 ==
In the fifth reading, God made a covenant with Noah, his sons, and every living thing that never again would a flood destroy the earth. God set the rainbow in the clouds as the sign of God's covenant with earth, so that when the bow appeared in the clouds, God would remember God's covenant and the waters would never again flood to destroy all flesh. The fifth reading and the first open portion end here.

=== In classical rabbinic interpretation ===
==== The promise of no calamity yet anticipation of calamity ====
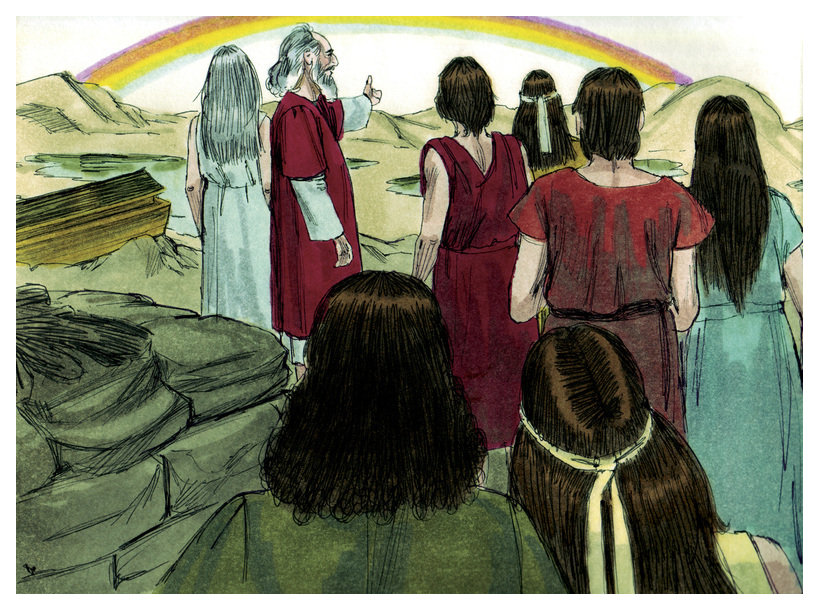
God made a promise never again to destroy all the living things on the earth with a flood. (1984 illustration by Jim Padgett, courtesy of Sweet Publishing)

Rabbi Jacob bar Aha said in the name of Rav Assi that Abraham asked God whether God would wipe out Abraham's descendants as God had destroyed the generation of the Flood. Rabbi Jacob bar Aha said in the name of Rav Assi that Abraham's question in Genesis 15:8, "O Lord God, how shall I know that I shall inherit it?" was part of a larger dialogue. Abraham asked God if Abraham's descendants should sin before God, would God do to them as God did to the generation of the Flood (in Genesis 6–8) and the generation of the Dispersion (in Genesis in Genesis 11:1–9). God told Abraham that God would not. Abraham then asked God (as reported in Genesis 15:8), "Let me know how I shall inherit it." God answered by instructing Abraham (as reported in Genesis 15:9), "Take Me a heifer of three years old, and a she-goat of three years old" (which Abraham was to sacrifice to God). Abraham acknowledged to God that this means of atonement through sacrifice would hold good while a sacrificial shrine remained in being, but Abraham pressed God what would become of his descendants when the Temple would no longer exist. God replied that God had already long ago provided for Abraham's descendants in the Torah the order of the sacrifices, and whenever they read it, God would deem it as if they had offered them before God, and God would grant them pardon for all their iniquities. Rabbi Jacob bar Aha said in the name of Rav Assi that this demonstrated that were it not for the מעמדות, Ma'amadot, groups of lay Israelites who participated in worship as representatives of the public, then heaven and earth could not endure.

Rabbi Meir taught that while it was certain that God would never again flood the world with water (Genesis 9:11), God might bring a flood of fire and brimstone, as God brought upon Sodom and Gomorrah.

==== The rainbow ====
The Mishnah taught that the rainbow (of Genesis 9:13) was one of ten miraculous things that God created on the sixth day of creation at twilight on the eve of the Sabbath. Rabbi Jose and Rabbi Judah disagreed whether verses of remembrance referring to the rainbow (Genesis 9:15–16) needed to be said together or individually.

The Gemara helped explain why (as Genesis 9:13 reports) God chose a rainbow as the symbol of God's promise. The Mishnah taught with regard to those who take no thought for the honor of their Maker, that it would have been better if they had not been born. Rabbi Abba read this Mishnah to refer to those who stare at a rainbow, while Rav Joseph said that it refers to those who commit transgressions in secret. The Gemara explained that those who stare at a rainbow affront God's honor, as Ezekiel 1:28 compares God's appearance to that of a rainbow: "As the appearance of the bow that is in the cloud in the day, so was the appearance of the brightness round about. This was the appearance of the likeness of the glory of the Lord." Thus, those who stare at a rainbow behave as if they were staring directly at God. Similarly, Rabbi Judah ben Rabbi Naḥmani, the speaker for Resh Lakish, taught that because Ezekiel 1:28 compares God's appearance to that of a rainbow, staring at the rainbow harms one's eyesight.

=== In modern interpretation ===
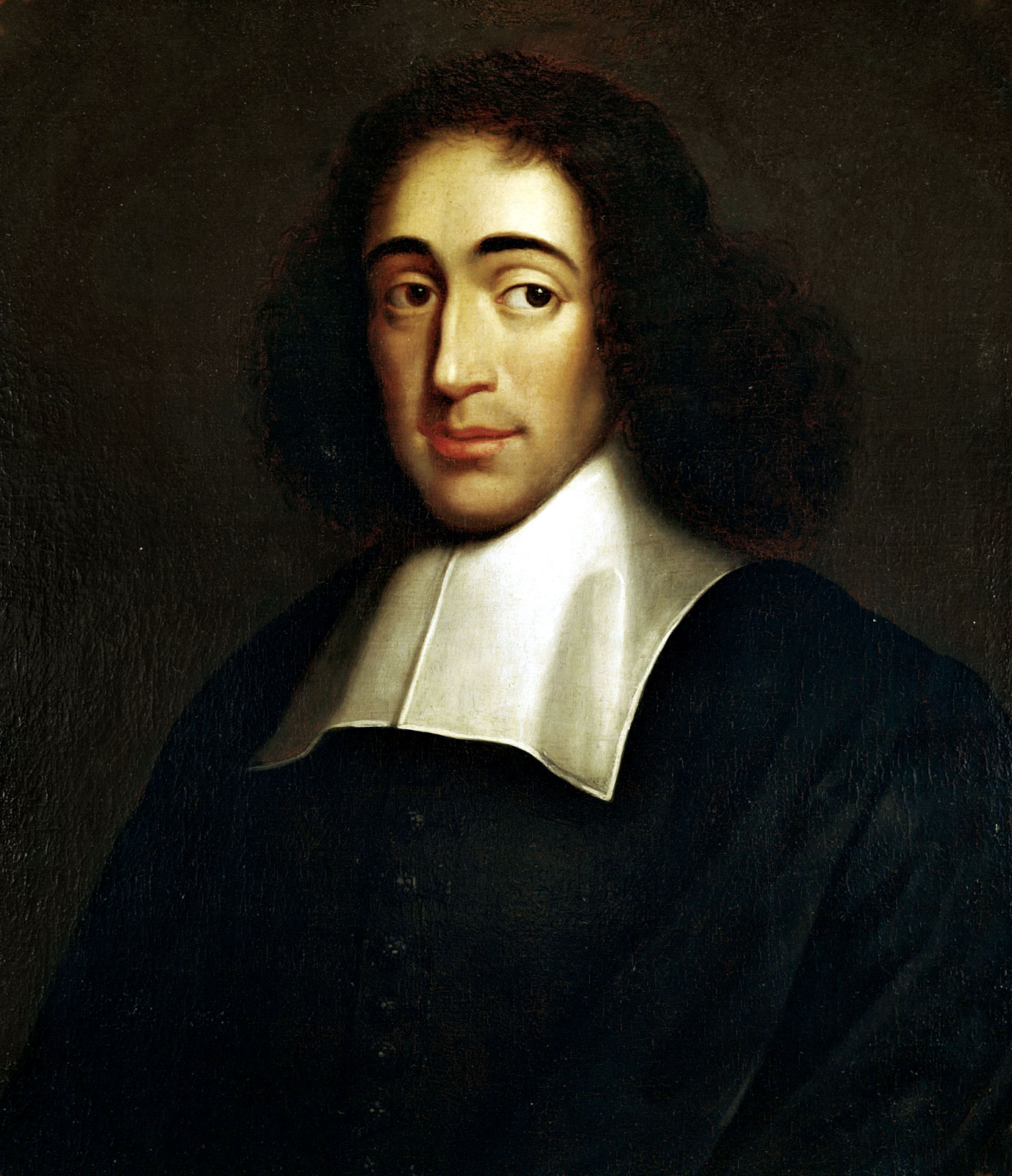
Spinoza

Baruch Spinoza explained the report of Genesis 9:13, in which God told Noah that God would set God's rainbow in the cloud, as but another way of expressing the refraction and reflection that the rays of the sun are subjected to in drops of water. Spinoza concluded that God's decrees and mandates, and consequently God's Providence, are merely the order of nature, and when Scripture describes an event as accomplished by God or God's will, we must understand merely that it was in accordance with the law and order of nature, not that nature had for a time ceased to act, or that nature's order was temporarily interrupted.

== Sixth reading—Genesis 9:18–10:32 ==
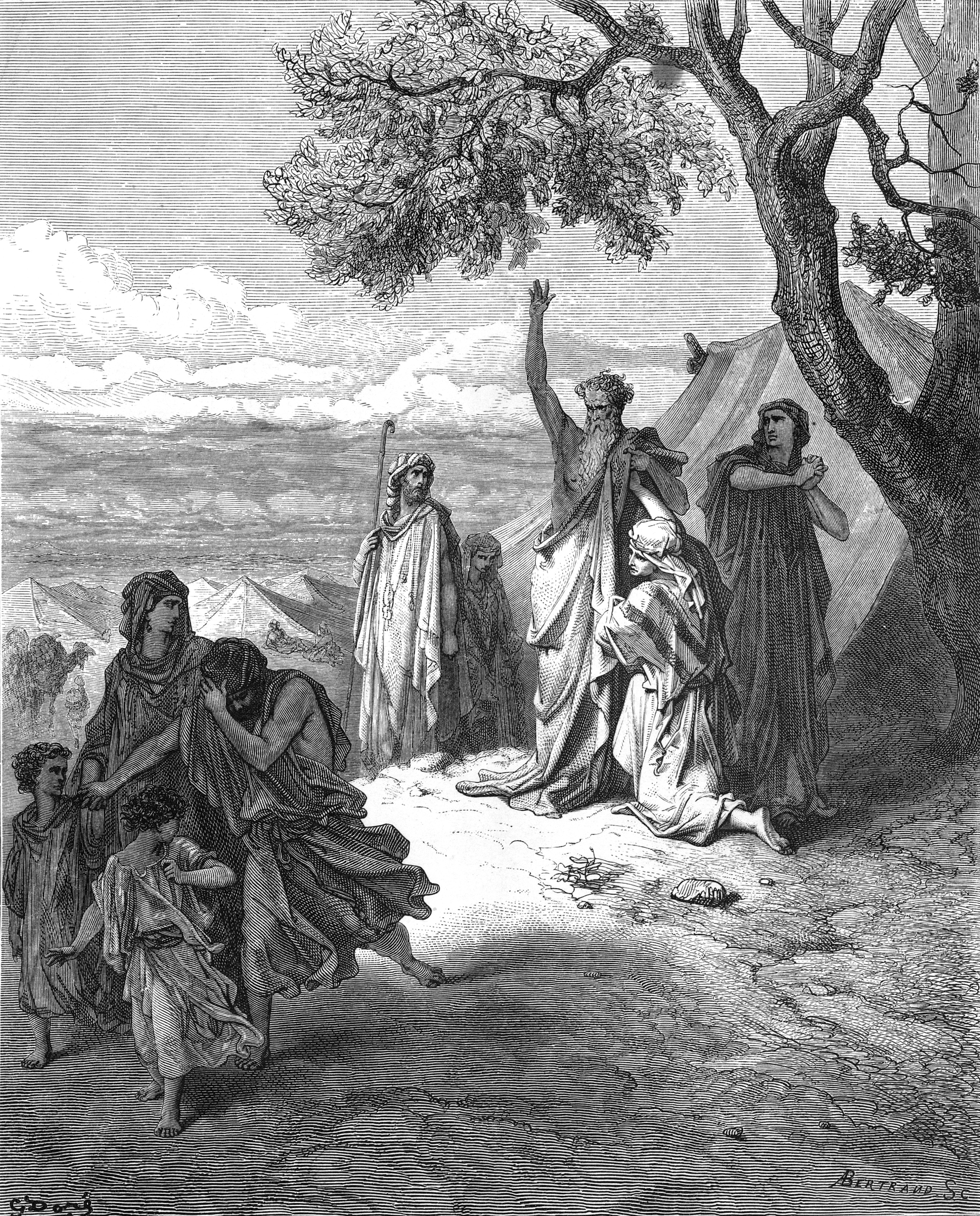
Noah cursing Canaan (illustration by Gustave Doré from the 1865 La Sainte Bible)

In the sixth reading, Noah became the first to plant a vineyard, and he drank himself drunk, and was uncovered within his tent. Ham, the father of Canaan, saw his father's nakedness and told his two brothers. Shem and Japheth placed a cloth against both their backs and, walking backward, covered their father, without seeing their father's nakedness. When Noah woke up and learned what Ham had done to him, he cursed Ham's son Canaan to become the lowest of slaves to Japheth and Shem, prayed that God enlarge Japheth, and blessed the God of Shem. Noah lived to the age of 950 and then died. The second open portion ends here.

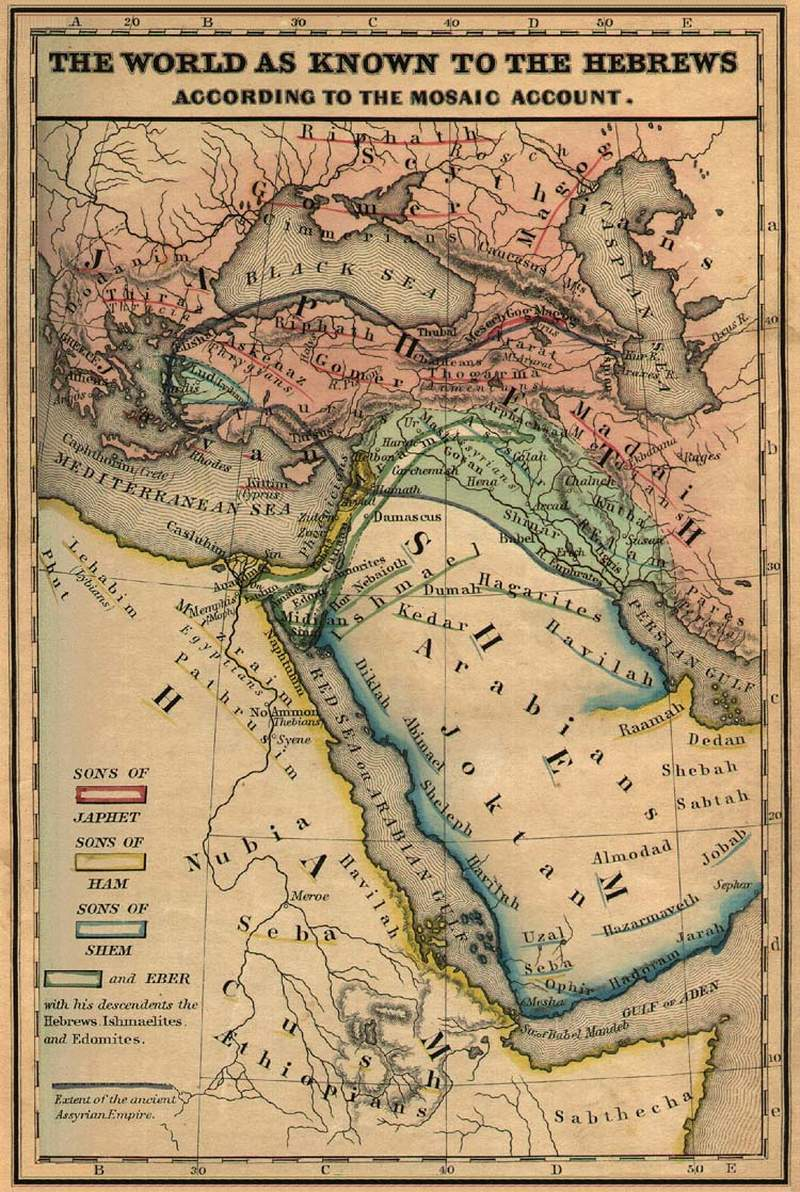
The dispersion of the descendants of Shem, Ham, and Japheth (map from the 1854 Historical Textbook and Atlas of Biblical Geography)

As the reading continues, chapter 10 sets forth the descendants of Shem, Ham, and Japheth, from whom the nations branched out over the earth after the Flood, a section known as the table of nations. Among Japheth's descendants were the Japhetites, which are the maritime nations. Ham's son Cush had a son named Nimrod, who became the first man of might on earth, a mighty hunter, king in Babylon and the land of Shinar. From there Asshur went and built Nineveh. Ham's son Mizraim had sons from whom came the Philistines and Caphtorim. A closed portion ends here.

In the continuation of the reading, Canaan's descendants—Sidon, Heth, the Jebusites, the Amorites, the Girgashites, the Hivites, the Arkites, the Sinites, the Arvadites, the Zemarites, and the Hamathites—spread out from Sidon as far as Gerar, near Gaza, and as far as Sodom and Gomorrah. Another closed portion ends here.

The continuation of the reading set forth Shem's descendants, among whom was Eber. The sixth reading and the third open portion end here with the end of chapter 10.

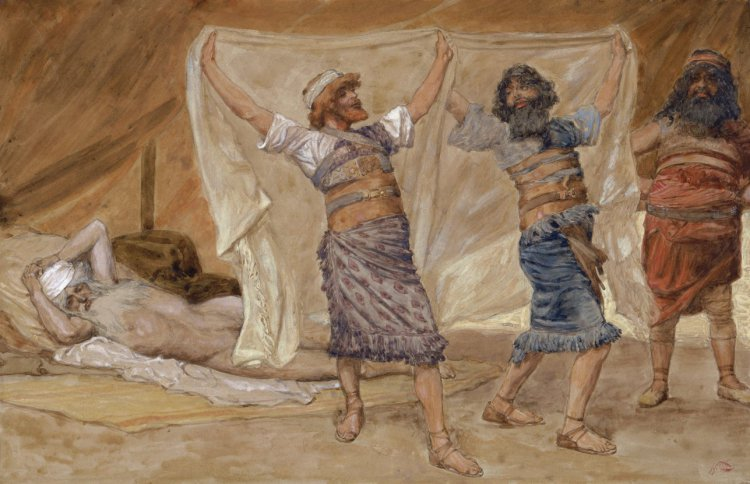
Noah's Drunkenness (watercolor circa 1896–1902 by James Tissot)

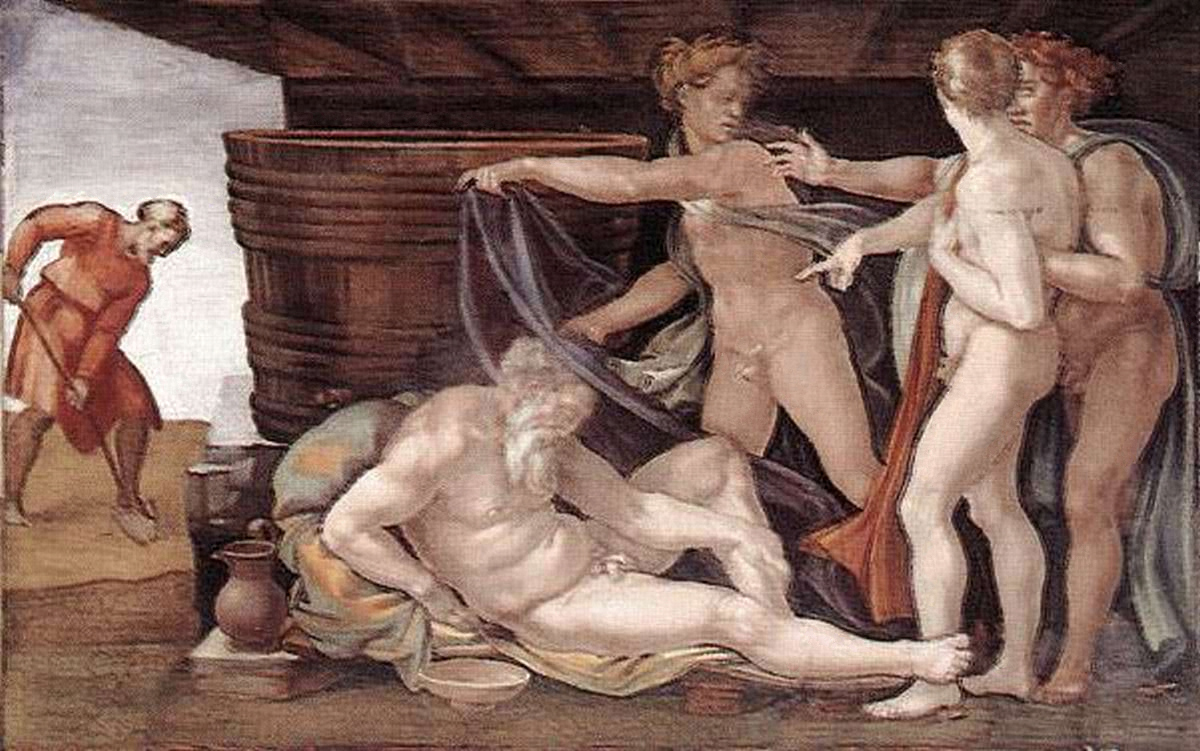
The Drunkenness of Noah (1509 fresco by Michelangelo at the Sistine Chapel)

=== In classical rabbinic interpretation ===
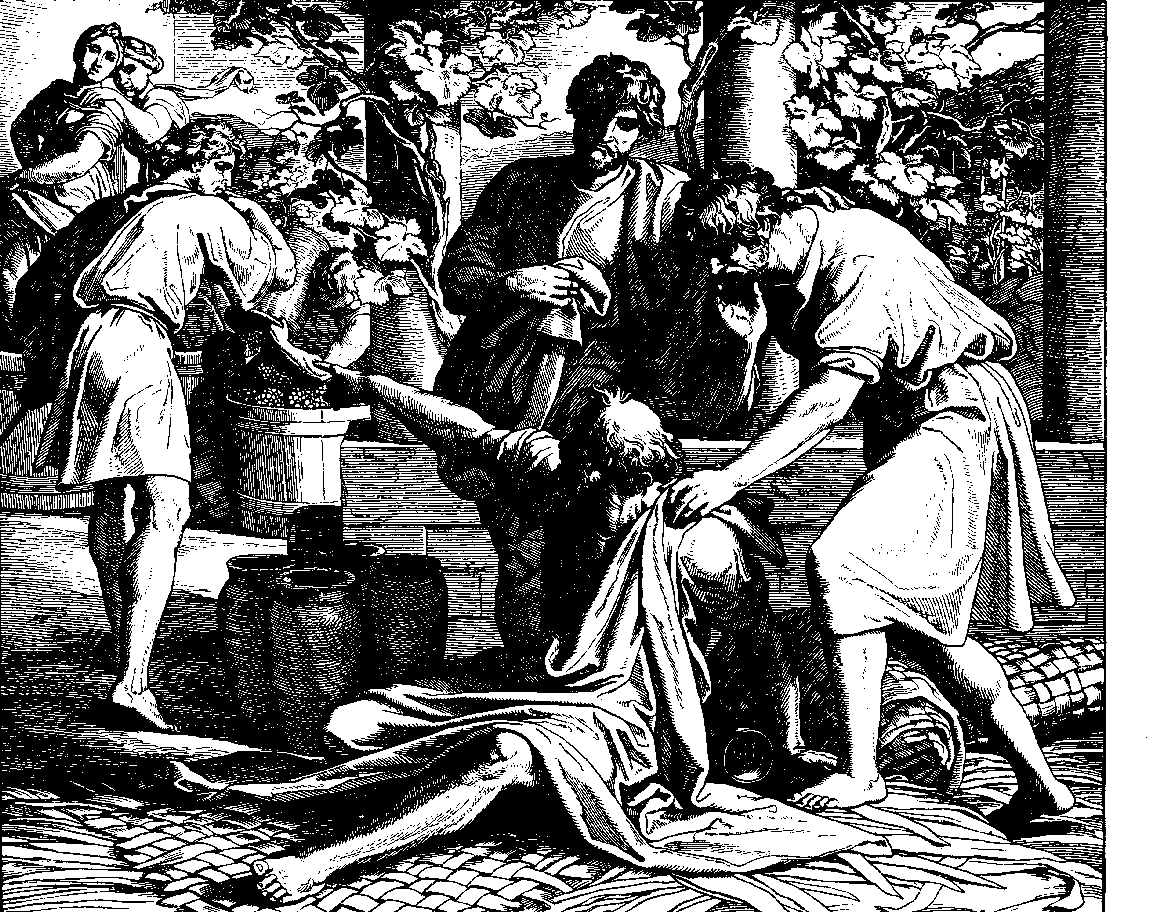
Noah's curse of Canaan (engraving by Julius Schnorr von Carolsfeld from the 1860 Bible in Pictures)

==== Interpretations of curse of Canaan ====
The Talmud deduced two possible explanations (attributed to Rav and Rabbi Samuel) for what Ham did to Noah to warrant Noah's curse of Canaan. According to one explanation, Ham castrated Noah, while the other says that Ham sexually abused Noah. The textual argument for castration goes this way: Since Noah cursed Ham by his fourth son Canaan, Ham must have injured Noah with respect to a fourth son, by emasculating him, thus depriving Noah of the possibility of a fourth son. The argument for abuse from the text draws an analogy between "and he saw" written in two places in the Bible: With regard to Ham and Noah, it was written, "And Ham the father of Canaan saw the nakedness of his father (Noah)"; while in Genesis 34:2, it was written, "And when Shechem the son of Hamor saw her (Dinah), he took her and lay with her and defiled her." Thus this explanation deduced that similar abuse must have happened each time that the Bible uses the same language.

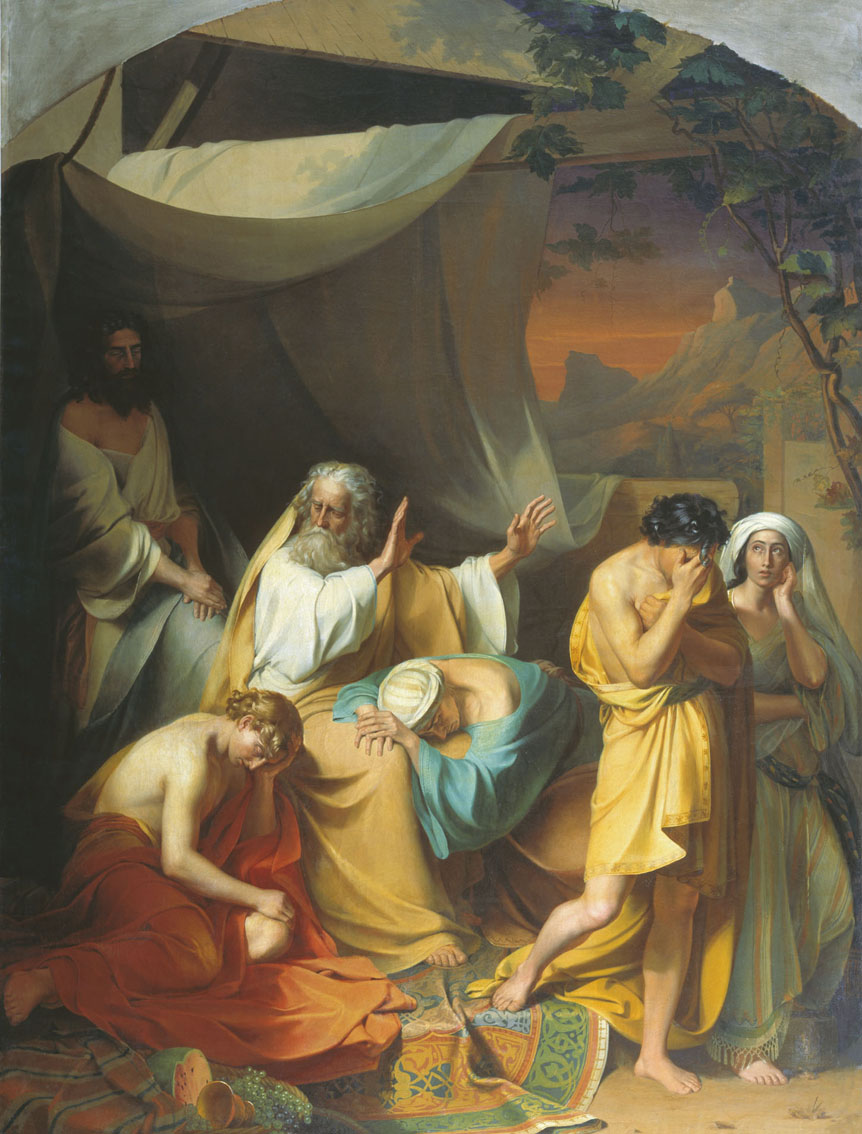
Noah damning Ham (19th-century painting by Ivan Stepanovitch Ksenofontov)

A baraita employed Genesis 10:6 to interpret the words "and Hebron was built seven years before Zoan in Egypt" in Numbers 13:22 to mean that Hebron was seven times as fertile as Zoan. The baraita rejected the plain meaning of "built," reasoning that Ham would not build a house for his younger son Canaan (in whose land was Hebron) before he built one for his elder son Mizraim (in whose land was Zoan, and Genesis 10:6 lists (presumably in order of birth) "the sons of Ham: Cush, and Mizraim, and Put, and Canaan." The baraita also taught that among all the nations, there was none more fertile than Egypt, for Genesis 13:10 says, "Like the garden of the Lord, like the land of Egypt." And there was no more fertile spot in Egypt than Zoan, where kings lived, for Isaiah 30:4 says of Pharaoh, "his princes are at Zoan." And in all of Israel, there was no more rocky ground than that at Hebron, which is why the Patriarchs buried their dead there, as reported in Genesis 49:31. But rocky Hebron was still seven times as fertile as lush Zoan.

Rab and Samuel equated the Amraphel of Genesis 14:1 with the Nimrod whom Genesis 10:8 describes as "a mighty warrior on the earth," but the two differed over which was his real name. One held that his name was actually Nimrod, and Genesis 14:1 calls him Amraphel because he ordered Abraham to be cast into a burning furnace (and thus the name Amraphel reflects the words for "he said" (amar) and "he cast" (hipil)). But the other held that his name was actually Amraphel, and Genesis 10:8 calls him Nimrod because he led the world in rebellion against God (and thus the name Nimrod reflects the word for "he led in rebellion" (himrid)).

=== In modern interpretation ===
Spinoza noted that Abraham ibn Ezra alluded to a difficulty by noting that if, as Genesis 10:19 indicates, Canaan first settled the land, then the Canaanites still possessed those territories during the time of Moses. Spinoza deduced that the person who wrote Genesis 12:6, "the Canaanite was then in the land," must thus have written at a time when the Canaanites had been driven out and no longer possessed the land, and thus after the death of Moses. Spinoza concluded that Moses did not write the Torah, but someone who lived long after him, and that the book that Moses wrote was something different from any now extant.

== Seventh reading—Genesis 11:1–32 ==
The Tower of Babel (1563 painting by Pieter Bruegel)

In the seventh reading, in chapter 11, everyone on earth spoke the same language. As people migrated from the east, they settled in the land of Shinar. People there sought to make bricks and build a city and a tower with its top in the sky, to make a name for themselves, so that they not be scattered over the world. God came down to look at the city and tower, and remarked that as one people with one language, nothing that they sought would be out of their reach. God went down and confounded their speech, so that they could not understand each another, and scattered them over the face of the earth, and they stopped building the city. Thus the city was called Babel. The fourth open portion ends here.

The continuation of the reading sets forth the descendants of Shem. Eight closed portion divisions separate each generation.

As the reading continues, eight generations after Shem, Terah had three sons: Abram (who would become Abraham), Nahor, and Haran. Haran had a son Lot and two daughters Milcah and Iscah, and then died in Ur during the lifetime of his father Terah.

In the maftir (מפטיר) reading that concludes the parashah, Abram married Sarai, and Nahor married Haran's daughter Milcah. Sarai was barren. Terah took Abram, Sarai, and Lot and set out together from Ur for the land of Canaan, but when they had come as far as Haran, they settled there, and there Terah died. The seventh reading, the fifth open portion, chapter 11, and the parashah end here.

=== In classical rabbinic interpretation ===
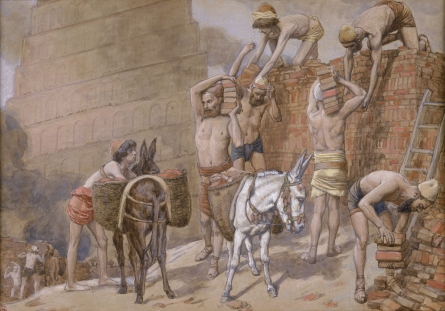
Building the Tower of Babel (watercolor circa 1896–1902 by James Tissot)

==== Psalms referencing the story ====
Rabbi Leazar in the name of Rabbi Jose bar Zimra found the story of the generation of the Dispersion (reported in Genesis 11:1–9) reflected in the words of Psalm 59:12–13: "Slay them not, lest my people forget, make them wander to and fro by Your power, and bring them down, O Lord, our Shield, for the sin of their mouth, and the words of their lips." Rabbi Leazar told in the name of Rabbi Jose bar Zimra that the people of Israel asked God: "Slay them [the generation of Dispersion] not, lest my people forget" and the generations that followed them forget. "Make them wander to and fro by Your power"—cast them away. "And bring them down" from the top of their tower to the land. But for us, said Israel, may "The Lord be our shield." "For the sin of their mouth"—for the sin that the generation of the Dispersion uttered when they said that once in every 1,656 years (the time from the Creation to the Flood), the Firmament disintegrates (thus not recognizing that God unleashed the Flood because of human evil). Therefore, they said, people should make supports for the Firmament, one in the north, one in the south, one in the west, and the Tower of Babel in the east. "And the word of their lips" reflects that they said this to each other by virtue of the "one language" that Genesis 11:1 reports that they had.

==== Debate on the toponym Shinar ====
In the Jerusalem Talmud, the rabbis debated why Genesis 11:2 calls the land Shinar. Rabbi Simeon ben Lakish (Resh Lakish) said it is called Shinar because there the dead of the Flood were deposited (taking שׁנער, Shinar, as a contraction of שׁם ננערו, sham ninaru, "there they were deposited"). Another explanation was because they died in anguish, without light or public baths (as they had neither olive oil for light nor plentiful wood for heating public hot baths). Another explanation was because they lacked commandments, without terumah or tithes. Another explanation was because its princes died young. Another explanation was because it produced a hater and enemy of God—the evil Nebuchadnezzar.

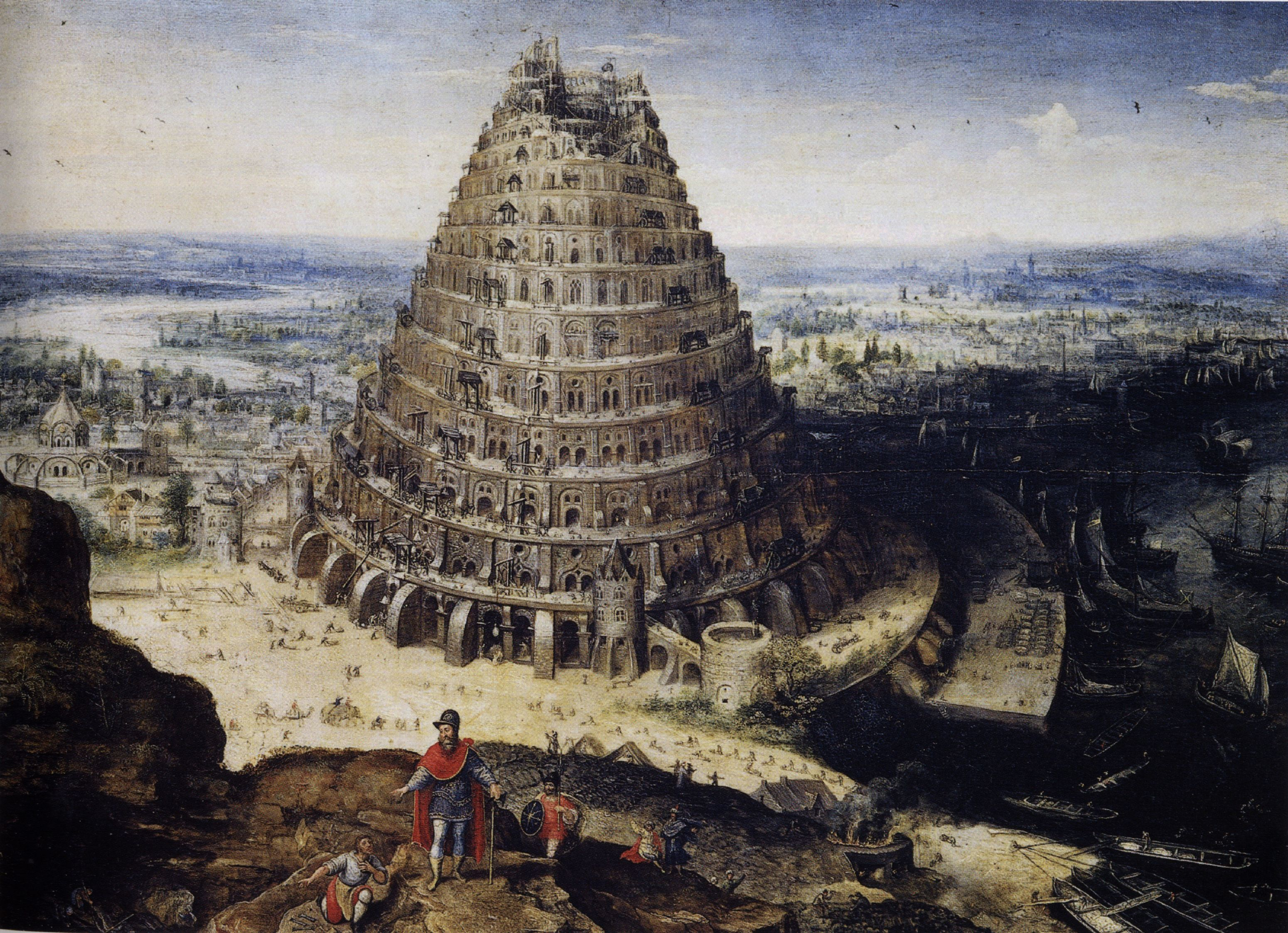
The Tower of Babel (1594 painting by Lucas van Valckenborch at the Louvre)

==== Vayehi, the implication of woe ====
Rabbi Levi, or some say Rabbi Jonathan, said that a tradition handed down from the Men of the Great Assembly taught that wherever the Bible employs the term "and it was" or "and it came to pass" (וַיְהִי, wa-yehi), as it does in Genesis 11:2, it indicates misfortune, as one can read wa-yehi as wai, hi, "woe, sorrow". Thus, the words, "And it came to pass" in Genesis 11:2 are followed by the words "Come, let us build us a city" in Genesis 11:4. And the Gemara also cited the instances of Genesis 6:1 followed by Genesis 6:5; Genesis 14:1 followed by Genesis 14:2; Joshua 5:13 followed by the rest of Joshua 5:13; Joshua 6:27 followed by Joshua 7:1; 1 Samuel 1:1 followed by 1 Samuel 1:5; 1 Samuel 8:1 followed by 1 Samuel 8:3; 1 Samuel 18:14 close after 1 Samuel 18:9; 2 Samuel 7:1 followed by 1 Kings 8:19; Ruth 1:1 followed by the rest of Ruth 1:1; and Esther 1:1 followed by Haman. But the Gemara also cited as counterexamples the words, "And there was evening and there was morning one day," in Genesis 1:5, as well as Genesis 29:10, and 1 Kings 6:1. So Rav Ashi replied that wa-yehi sometimes presages misfortune, and sometimes it does not, but the expression "and it came to pass in the days of" always presages misfortune. And for that proposition, the Gemara cited Genesis 14:1, Isaiah 7:1, Jeremiah 1:3, Ruth 1:1, and Esther 1:1.

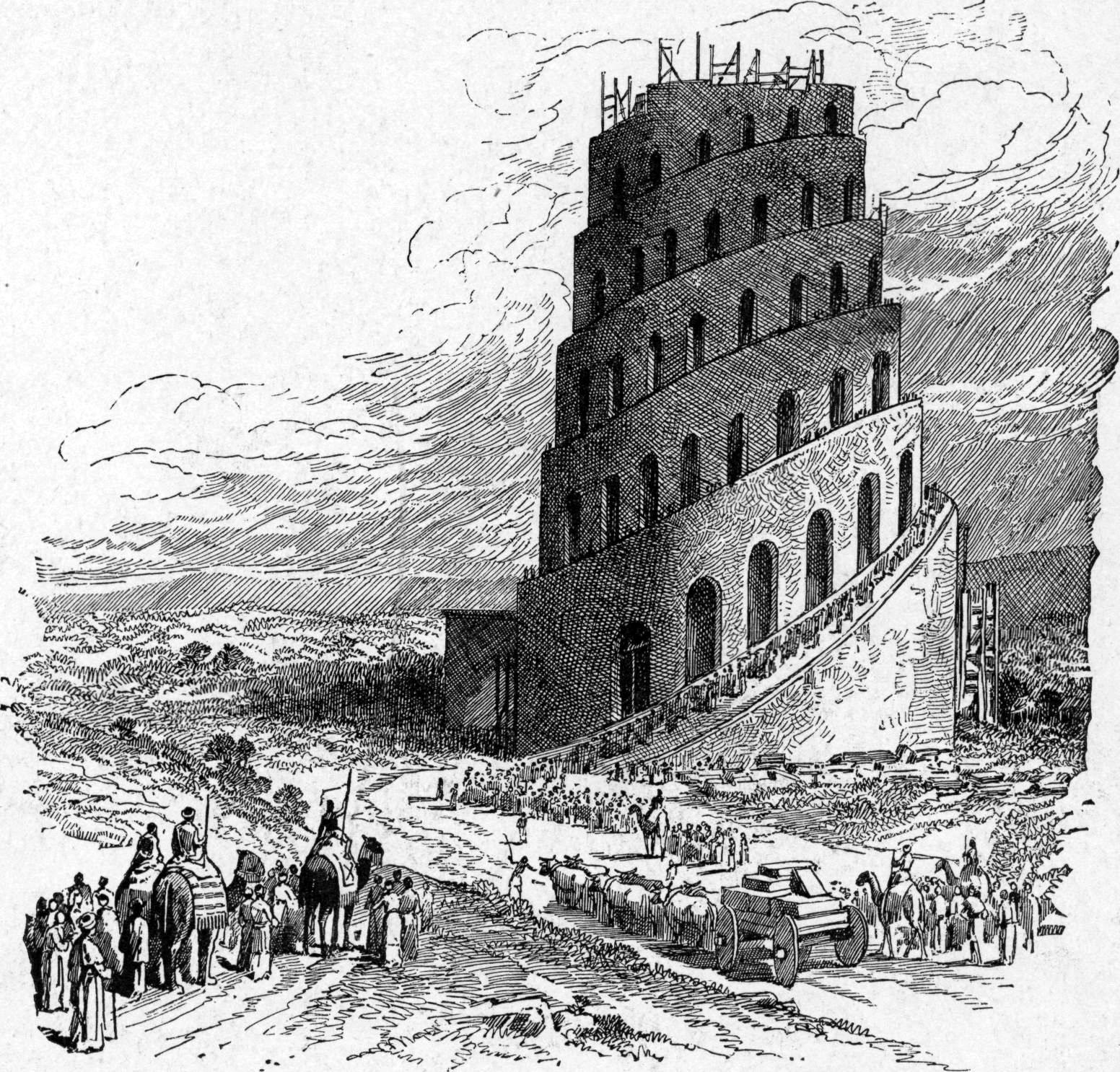
The Tower of Babel (illustration from the 1897 Bible Pictures and What They Teach Us by Charles Foster)

==== Parallel verse in Nimrod story ====
Rabbi Joḥanan said in the name of Rabbi Eleazar the son of Rabbi Simeon that wherever you find the words of Rabbi Eleazar the son of Rabbi Jose the Galilean in an Aggadah, make your ear like a funnel (to receive the teaching). (Rabbi Eleazar taught that) God bestowed greatness on Nimrod, but Nimrod (did not humble himself, but) said, in the words of Genesis 11:4, "Come, let us build ourselves a city."

==== What the generation of dispersion did wrong ====
The Tosefta taught that the men of the Tower of Babel acted arrogantly before God only because God had been so good to them (in Genesis 11:1–2) as to give them a single language and allow them to settle in Shinar. And as usage elsewhere indicated that "settle" meant "eat and drink" (see Exodus 32:6), this eating and drinking was what led them to say (in Genesis 11:4) that they wanted to build the Tower.

The Mishnah taught that the generation of the dispersion has no portion in the world to come. The Gemara asked what they did to justify this punishment. The scholars of the academy of Rav Shila taught that they sought to build a tower, ascend to heaven, and cleave it with axes, that its waters might gush forth. In the academies of the Land of Israel, they laughed at this, arguing that if the generation of the dispersion had sought to do so, they should have built the tower on a mountain. Rabbi Jeremiah bar Eleazar taught that the generation of the dispersion split into three parties. One party sought to ascend to heaven and dwell there. The second party sought to ascend to heaven and serve idols. And the third party sought to ascend and wage war with God. God scattered the party that proposed to ascend and dwell there. God turned into apes, spirits, devils, and night-demons the party that sought to ascend and wage war with God. As for the party that sought to ascend and serve idols, God responded, in the words of Genesis 11:9, "for there the Lord did confound the language of all the earth." It was taught in a baraita that Rabbi Nathan said that the generation of the dispersion were all bent on idolatry. For Genesis 11:4 says, "let us make us a name," while Exodus 23:13 says, "and make no mention of the name of other gods." Rabbi Nathan reasoned that just as the word "name" indicates idolatry in Exodus 23:13, so does the word "name" in Genesis 11:4. Rabbi Jonathan taught that a third of the tower was burned, a third sank into the earth, and a third still stood at his time. Rav taught that the atmosphere of the tower caused forgetfulness. Rav Joseph taught that Babylon and the neighboring city of Borsif were both evil omens for the Torah, because one soon forgets one's learning there. Rabbi Assi said that the name "Borsif" means "an empty pit" (bor shafi), for it empties one of knowledge.

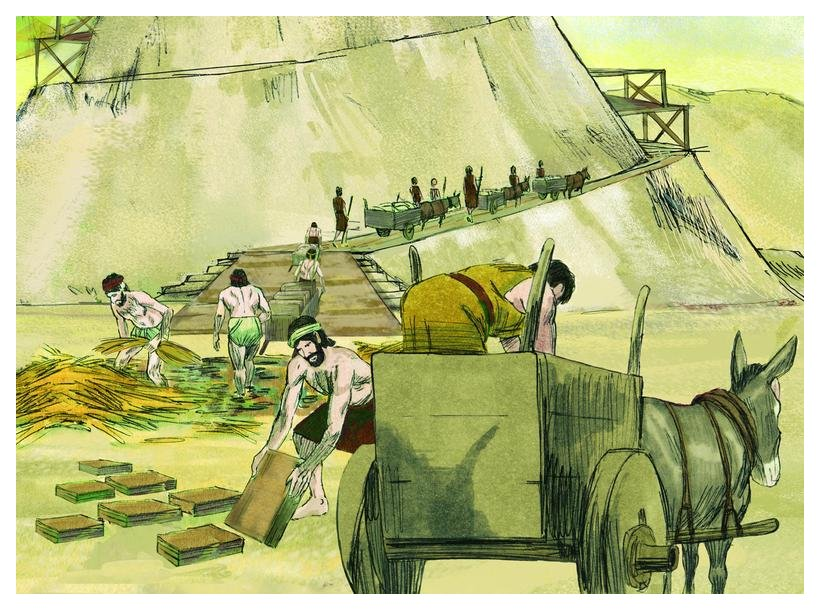
Building the Tower of Babel (1984 illustration by Jim Padgett, courtesy of Sweet Publishing)

Rabbi Phineas taught that the land of Babel had no stones with which to build the city and the tower. So they baked bricks until they built the tower seven miles high. The tower had ramps on its east and its west. Laborers took up the bricks on the eastern ramp, and people descended on the western ramp. If a man fell and died, the laborers paid him no heed, but if a brick fell, they sat and wept, asking when another brick would come in its stead.

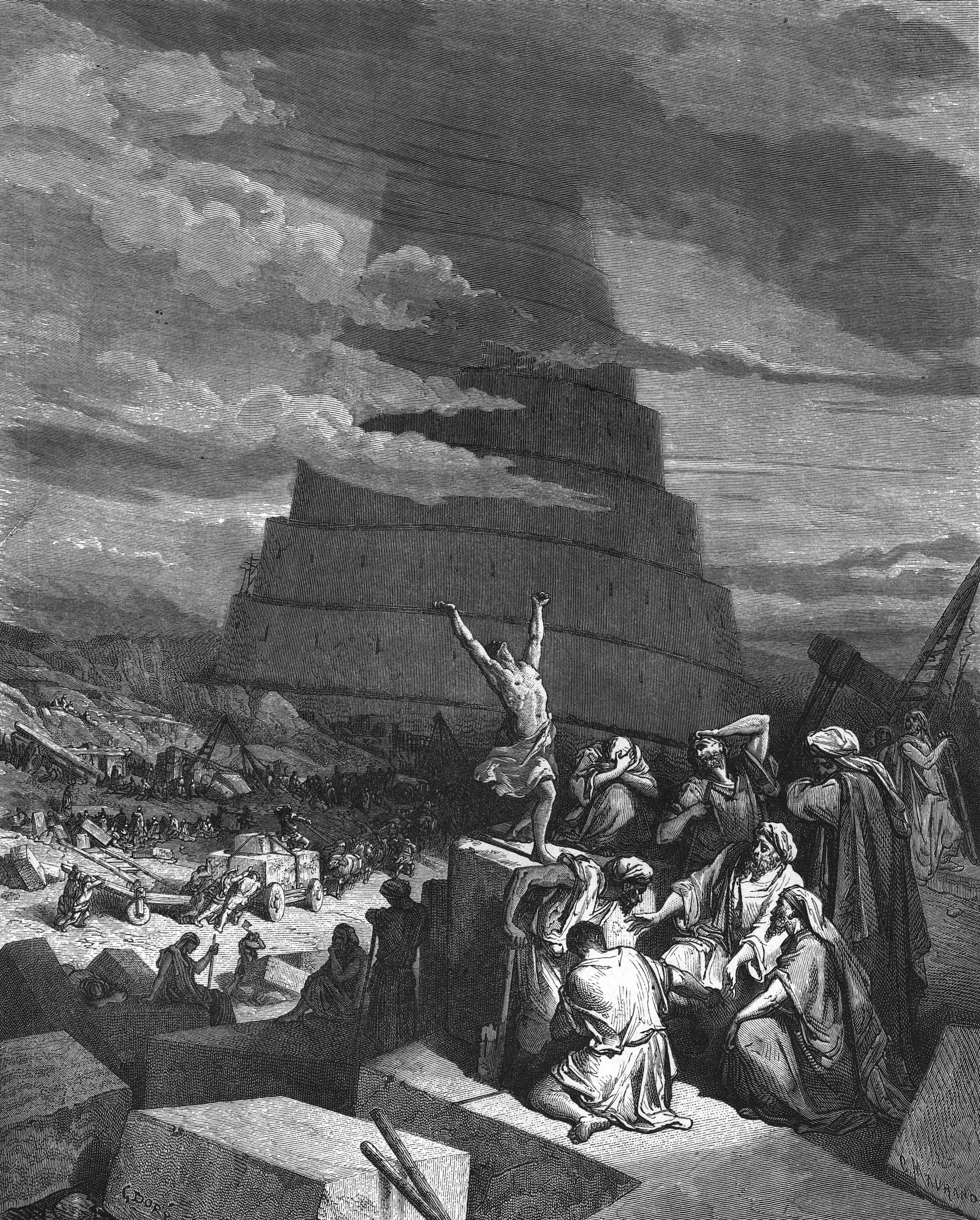
The Confusion of Tongues (engraving by Gustave Doré from the 1865 La Sainte Bible)

Rabbi Judah and Rabbi Nehemiah disagreed over how to interpret Genesis 11:6, "And the Lord said: 'Behold, they are one people, and they have all one language; and this is what they begin to do; and now nothing will be withheld from them, which they purpose to do.'" Rabbi Judah interpreted the words, "Behold, they are one people, and they have all one language," to mean that because the people lived in unity, if they had repented, God would have accepted them. But Rabbi Nehemiah explained that it was because "they are one people, and they have all one language," that they rebelled against God. Rabbi Abba bar Kahana taught that God gave them an opportunity to repent, for the words "and now" in Genesis 11:6 indicate repentance, for Deuteronomy 11:6 says, "And now, Israel, what does the Lord your God require of you, but to fear the Lord your God." But the next word of Genesis 11:6, "No," reports their response. The continuation of Genesis 11:6, then reports God's reply, "Then let all that they purpose to do be withheld from them!"

==== Confusion of languages by god descending ====
Rabbi Simeon bar Yoḥai taught that the report of Genesis 11:5 that "the Lord came down to see the city and the tower" was one of ten instances when the Torah reports that God descended.

Rabbi Joḥanan taught that wherever heretics have taken Biblical passages as grounds for their heresy, another passage nearby provides the refutation. Thus (the heretics questioned the use of the plural regarding God in Genesis 11:7): "Come, let us go down and there confound their language." (But nearby, in Genesis 11:5, it says in the singular): "And the Lord came down to see the city and the tower." Rabbi Joḥanan taught that God says, "let us," in the plural in Genesis 11:7 (and elsewhere) to show that God does nothing without first consulting God's Heavenly Court.

Rabbi Simeon said that God called to the 70 angels who surround the throne of God's glory and said, "Let us descend and let us confuse the 70 nations (that made up the world) and the 70 languages." Rabbi Simeon deduced this from Genesis 11:7, where God said, "Let us go down," not "I will go down." Rabbi Simeon taught that Deuteronomy 32:8, "When the Most High gave to the nations their inheritance," reports that they cast lots among them. God's lot fell upon Abraham and his descendants, as Deuteronomy 32:9 reports, "For the Lord's portion is his people; Jacob is the lot of his inheritance." God said that God's soul lives by the portion and lot that fell to God, as Psalm 16:6 says, "The lots have fallen to me in pleasures; yea, I have a goodly heritage." God then descended with the 70 angels who surround the throne of God's glory and they confused the speech of humankind into 70 nations and 70 languages.

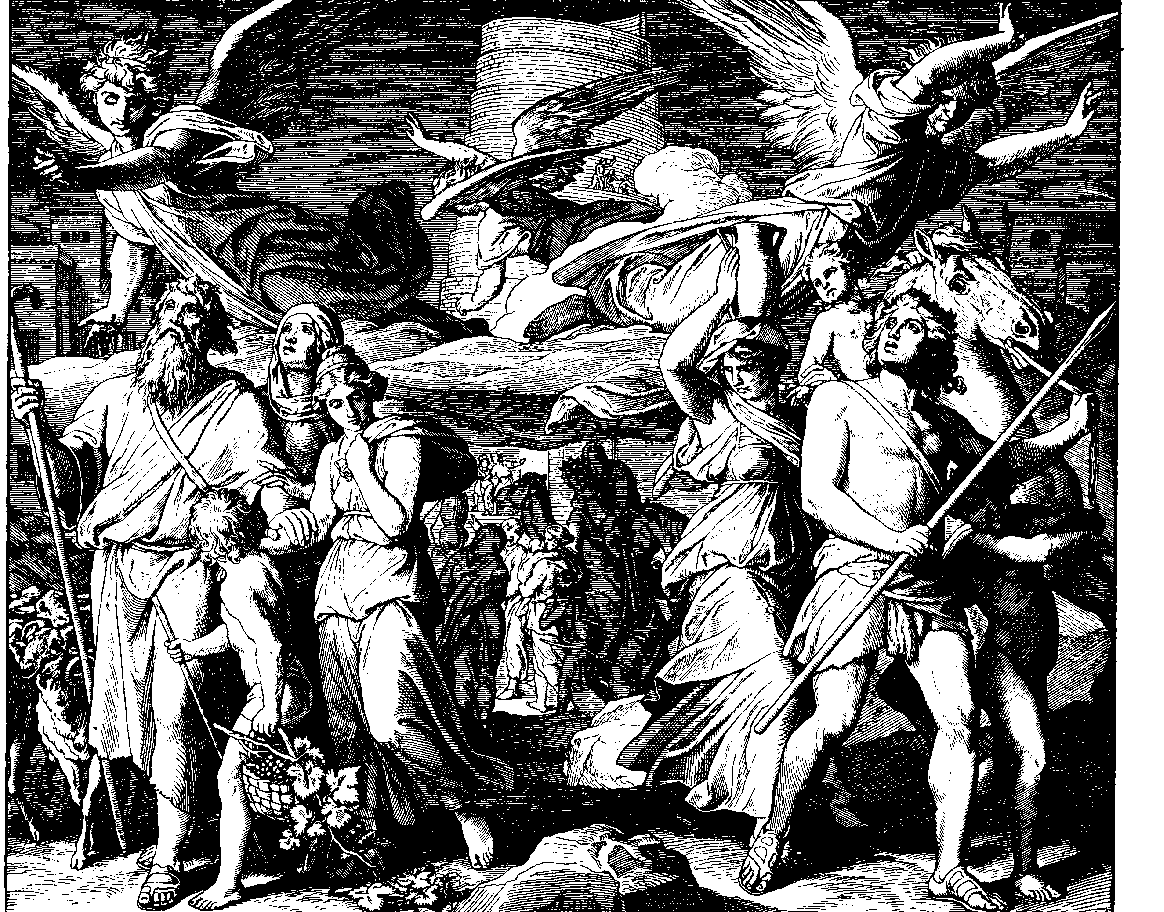
The Dispersion (engraving by Julius Schnorr von Carolsfeld from the 1860 Bible in Pictures)

The sages taught that the God who punished the generation of the Flood and the generation of the Dispersion would take vengeance on people who renege on their word after money has been paid.

The Gemara asked what the name Babel (which can mean "to mix" or "confound," as in Genesis 11:9) connotes. Rabbi Joḥanan answered that the study of Scripture, Mishnah, and Talmud was intermingled (in the study reported in the Babylonian Talmud).

==== Focus on ten and the trials of Abraham ====
The Mishnah observed that there were ten generations from Adam to Noah (enumerated in Genesis 5), to make known God's long-suffering; for all those generations kept on provoking God, until God brought upon them the waters of the Flood. And there were also ten generations from Noah to Abraham (enumerated in Genesis 11:10–26), to make known God's long-suffering; for all those generations kept on provoking God, until Abraham came and received the reward of all of them.

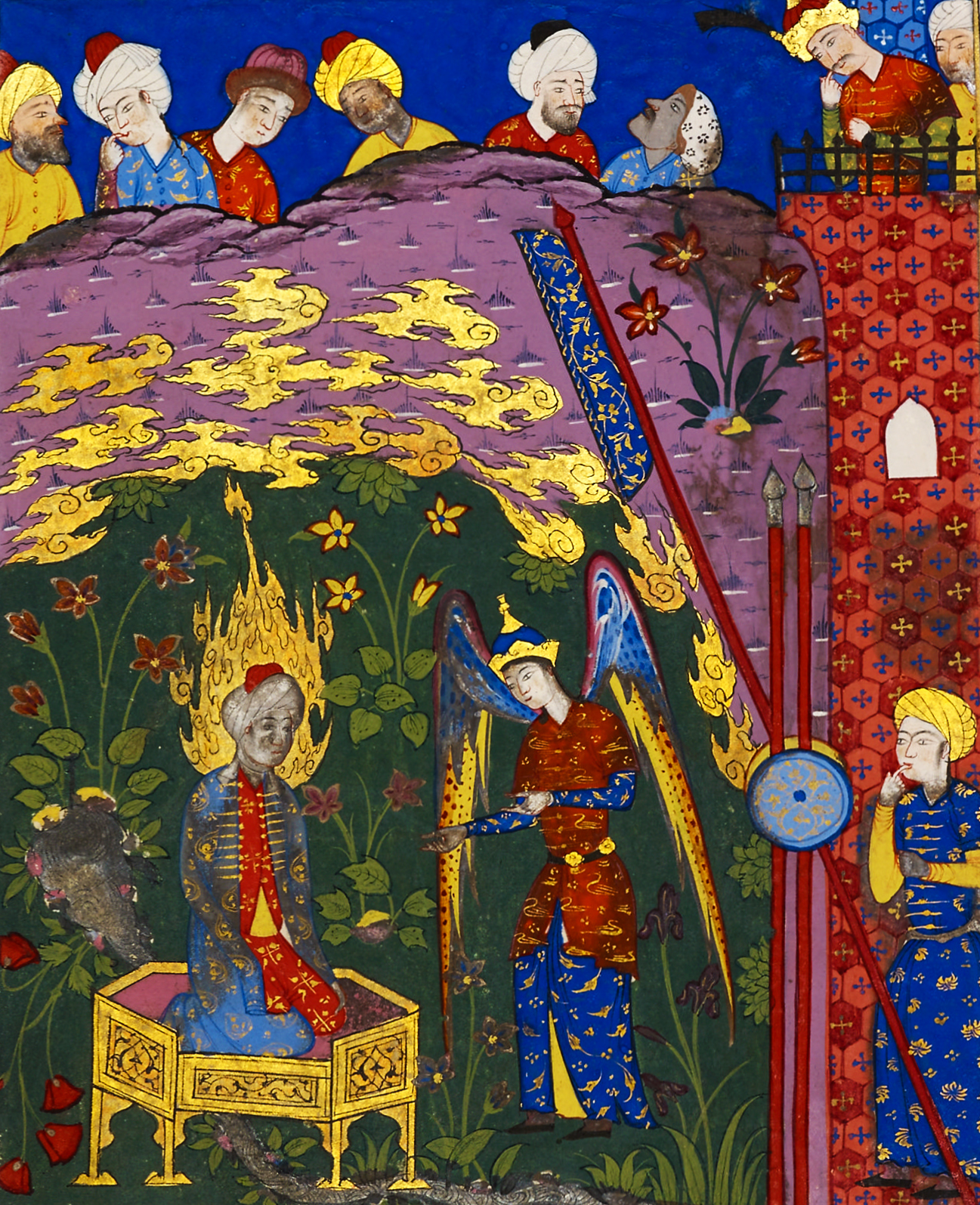
Islamic Persian miniature of Jibril protecting Ibrahim from Nimrod's fire.

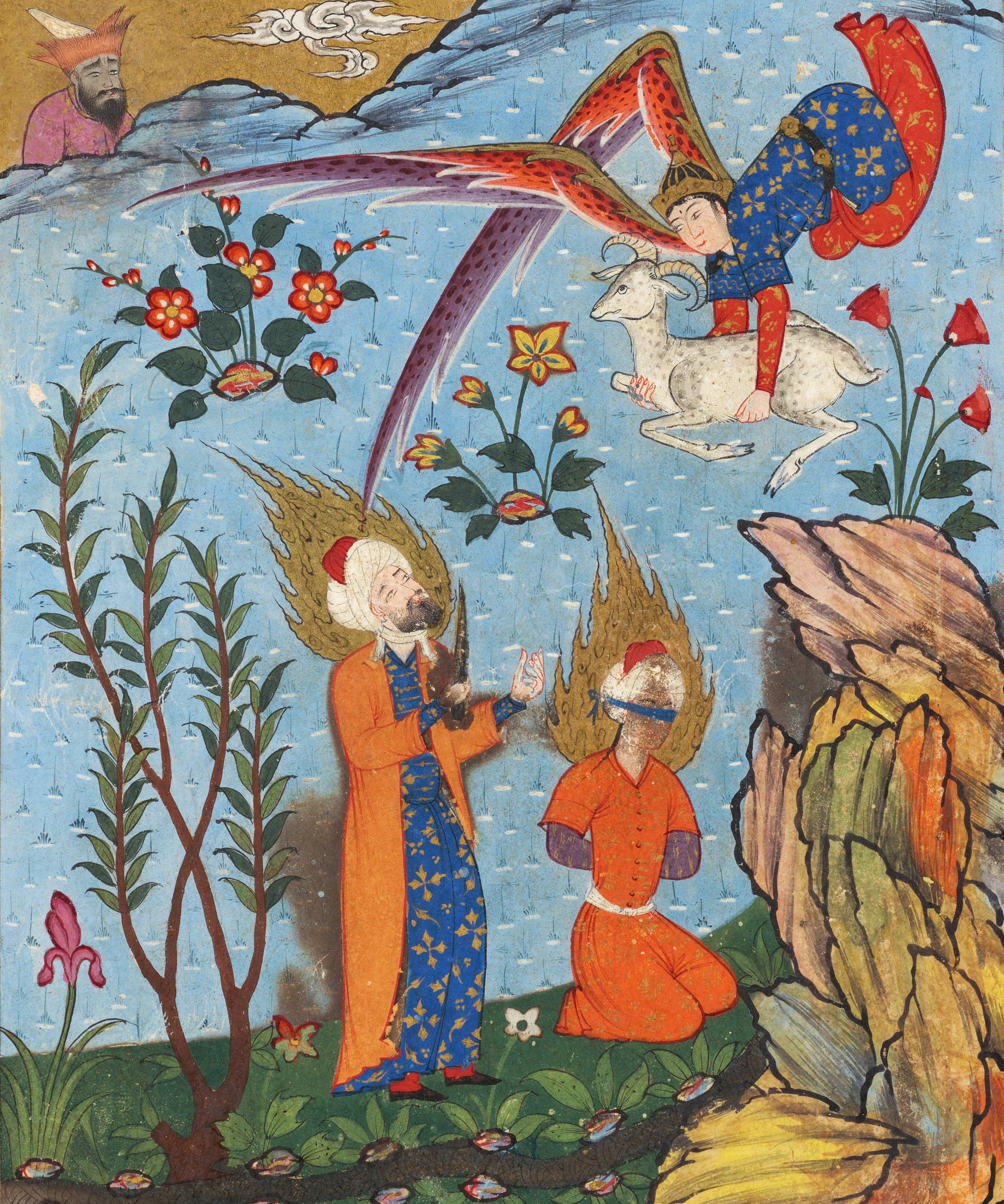
Sacrifice of Ibrahim's son stopped by intervening Jibril delivering a sheep.

The Mishnah taught that Abraham suffered ten trials and withstood them all, demonstrating how great Abraham's love was for God. The Avot of Rabbi Natan taught that two trials were at the time he was bidden to leave Haran, two were with his two sons, two were with his two wives, one was in the wars of the Kings, one was at the covenant between the pieces, one was in Ur of the Chaldees (where, according to a tradition, he was thrown into a furnace and came out unharmed), and one was the covenant of circumcision. Similarly, the Pirke De-Rabbi Eliezer counted as the 10 trials (1) when Abraham was a child and all the magnates of the kingdom and the magicians sought to kill him (see below), (2) when he was put into prison for ten years and cast into the furnace of fire, (3) his migration from his father's house and from the land of his birth, (4) the famine, (5) when Sarah his wife was taken to be Pharaoh's wife, (6) when the kings came against him to slay him, (7) when (in the words of Genesis 17:1) "the word of the Lord came to Abram in a vision," (8) when Abram was 99 years old and God asked him to circumcise himself, (9) when Sarah asked Abraham (in the words of Genesis 21:10) to "Cast out this bondwoman and her son," and (10) the binding of Isaac.

The Pirke De-Rabbi Eliezer taught that the first trial was when Abram was born, and all the magnates of the kingdom and the magicians sought to kill him. Abram's family hid Abram in a cave for 13 years without seeing the sun or moon. After 13 years, Abram came out speaking the holy language, Hebrew, and he despised idols and held in abomination the graven images, and he trusted in God, saying (in the words of Psalm 84:12): "Blessed is the man who trusts in You." In the second trial, Abram was put in prison for ten years—three years in Kuthi, seven years in Budri. After ten years, they brought him out and cast him into the furnace of fire, and God delivered him from the furnace of fire, as Genesis 15:7 says, "And He said to him, 'I am the Lord who brought you out of the furnace of the Chaldees." Similarly, Nehemiah 9:7 reports, "You are the Lord the God, who did choose Abram, and brought him forth out of the furnace of the Chaldees." The third trial was Abram's migration from his father's house and from the land of his birth. God brought him to Haran, and there his father Terah died, and Athrai his mother. The Pirke De-Rabbi Eliezer taught that migration is harder for a human than for any other creature. And Genesis 12:1 tells of his migration when it says, "Now the Lord said to Abram, 'Get out.'"

==== Sarah as prophetess ====
The Gemara taught that Sarah was one of seven prophetesses who prophesied to Israel and neither took away from nor added anything to what is written in the Torah. (The other prophetesses were Miriam, Deborah, Hannah, Abigail, Huldah, and Esther.) The Gemara derived Sarah's status as a prophetess from the words, "Haran, the father of Milkah and the father of Yiscah," in Genesis 11:29. Rabbi Isaac taught that Yiscah was Sarah. Genesis 11:29 called her Yiscah (יִסְכָּה) because she discerned (saketah) by means of Divine inspiration, as Genesis 21:12 reports God instructing Abraham, "In all that Sarah says to you, hearken to her voice." Alternatively, Genesis 11:29 called her Yiscah because all gazed (sakin) at her beauty.

==== The barreness of Sarah ====
The Pesikta de-Rav Kahana taught that Sarah was one of seven barren women about whom Psalm 113:9 says (speaking of God), "He ... makes the barren woman to dwell in her house as a joyful mother of children." The Pesikta de-Rav Kahana also listed Rebekah Rachel, Leah, Manoah's wife, Hannah, and Zion. The Pesikta de-Rav Kahana taught that the words of Psalm 113:9, "He ... makes the barren woman to dwell in her house," apply, to begin with, to Sarah, for Genesis 11:30 reports that "Sarai was barren." And the words of Psalm 113:9, "a joyful mother of children," apply to Sarah, as well, for Genesis 21:7 also reports that "Sarah gave children suck."

Rav Naḥman said in the name of Rabbah bar Abbuha that the redundant report, "And Sarai was barren; she had no child," in Genesis 11:30 demonstrated that Sarah was incapable of procreation because she did not have a womb.

=== In medieval Jewish interpretation ===
Maimonides taught that when Scripture reports that God intended "to descend," it signals that God meant to punish humanity, as in Genesis 11:5, "And the Lord came down to see"; Genesis 11:7, "Let us go down and there confound their language"; and Genesis 18:21, "I will go down now and see."

In their commentaries to Mishnah Avot (see "In classical rabbinic interpretation" above), Rashi and Maimonides differed on what 10 trials Abraham faced:

	Rashi		Maimonides
1	Abraham hid underground for 13 years from King Nimrod, who wanted to kill him.		
2	Nimrod threw Abraham into a fiery furnace.		
3	God commanded Abraham to leave his family and homeland.	1	Abraham's exile from his family and homeland
4	As soon as he arrived in the Promised Land, Abraham was forced to leave to escape a famine.	2	The famine in the Promised Land after God assured Abraham that he would become a great nation there
5	Pharaoh's officials kidnapped Sarah.	3	The corruption in Egypt that resulted in the kidnapping of Sarah
6	Kings captured Lot, and Abraham had to rescue him.	4	The war with the four kings
7	God told Abraham that his descendants would suffer under four regimes.		
		5	Abraham's marriage to Hagar after having despaired that Sarah would ever give birth
8	God commanded Abraham to circumcise himself and his son when Abraham was 99 years old.	6	The commandment of circumcision
		7	Abimelech's abduction of Sarah
9	Abraham was commanded to drive away Ishmael and Hagar.	8	Driving away Hagar after she had given birth
		9	The very distasteful command to drive away Ishmael
10	God commanded Abraham to sacrifice Isaac.	10	The binding of Isaac on the altar

=== In modern interpretation ===
Brueggemann argued that Genesis 11 was as symmetrically structured as any narrative since Genesis 1, showing the conflict of human resolve with God's resolve:

A: 11:1: "Whole earth ... one language"

B: 11:3–4: Human words and actions

C: 11:4: "Come let us"

B^{1}: 11:6–7: God's words and actions

C^{1}: 11:7: "Come let us"

A^{1}: 11:9: "The language of all the earth ... all the earth"

Umberto Cassuto suggested that the Tower of Babel story in Genesis 11:1–9 reflects an earlier Israelite poem that regarded with a smile the boastful pride of the Babylonians in their city, temple, and ziggurat. Cassuto deduced that Israelites composed the poem when the city and tower were already in ruins, and he posited that they were written in the centuries after the fall of the First Babylonian dynasty and the destruction of Babylon by the Hittites in the middle of the 16th century B.C.E., during which Israelites remembered the bragging of the Babylonians with derision. Cassuto saw manifest irony in the report of Genesis 11:3, "And they had brick for stone," as if the Israelites mocked the object of Babylonian boasting—buildings of bricks, which stand today and tomorrow are in ruins—as if the poor Babylonians did not even have hard stone for building such as the Israelites had in the land of Israel. Similarly, Benno Jacob, writing in 1934, saw irony in the report of Genesis 11:5, "And the Lord came down," which implied that the tower supposed to reach to the heavens was still far from there, and that seen from above, the gigantic structure was only the work of "children," of miniature men.

John Goldingay noted that, as the Chaldeans became the rulers of Babylonia only with the arrival of Nabopolassar in 626, the report of Genesis 11:31 that Abraham and Sarah set out from "Ur of the Chaldeans" must have been written after that time.

=== In inner-biblical interpretation ===
Joshua 24:2 reports that Abram's father Terah lived beyond the River Euphrates and served other gods.

While Genesis 11:31 reports that Terah took Abram, Lot, and Sarai from Ur of the Chaldees to Haran, and Genesis 12:1 subsequently reports God's call to Abram to leave his country and his father's house, Nehemiah 9:7 reports that God chose Abram and brought him out of Ur of the Chaldees.

== Interpretation spanning multiple readings ==
=== In ancient parallels ===
The parashah has parallels in these ancient sources:

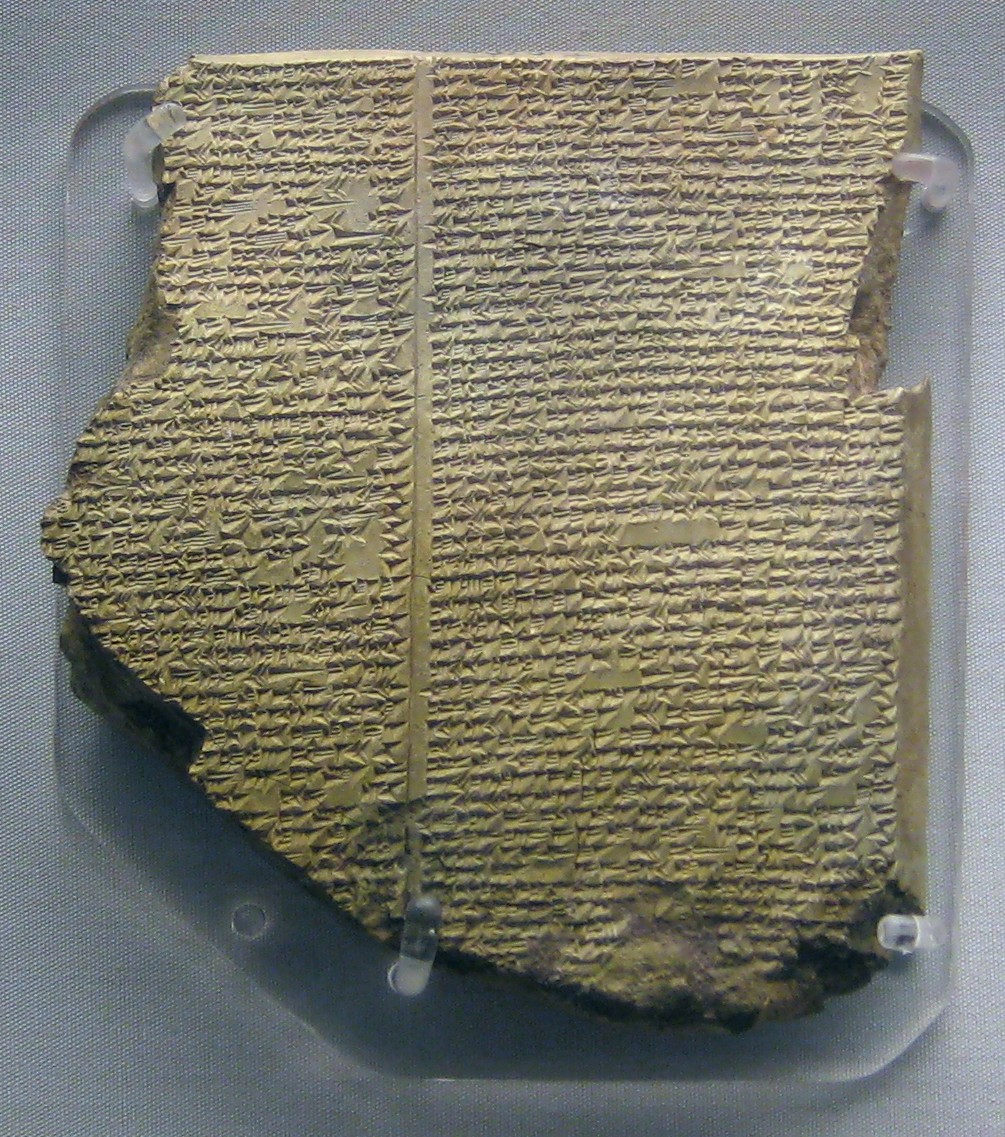
The Deluge Tablet of the Gilgamesh Epic

Tablet 11 of the Epic of Gilgamesh, composed in Mesopotamia in the 14th to 11th centuries BCE, presents a parallel flood story to that in Parashat Noach. John J. Collins reported that the flood story that came to be part of the Epic of Gilgamesh appears to have previously been an independent tale in Sumerian. Gary Rendsburg notes these similarities and differences:

Order	Story Element	In Gilgamesh?	Verses
1	Morality factor	No	Genesis 6:5–13
2	Wood, Pitch, Reeds	Yes	Genesis 6:14
3	Dimensions	Yes	Genesis 6:15
4	Decks	Yes	Genesis 6:16
5	Covenant	No	Genesis 6:17–22
6	Population	Yes	Genesis 7:1–5
7	Flood	Yes	Genesis 7:6–23
8	Mountaintop Landing	Yes	Genesis 7:24–8:5
9	Birds Sent Forth	Yes	Genesis 8:6–12
10	Dry Land	Yes, but less so	Genesis 8:13–14
11	All Set Free	Yes	Genesis 8:15–19
12	Sacrifices	Yes	Genesis 8:20–22

=== In early nonrabbinic interpretation ===
The parashah has parallels or is discussed in these early nonrabbinic sources:

The Septuagint translated the word for "generations" or "story" (תוֹלְדוֹת, toledot) in Genesis 6:9, 10:1, 11:10, and 11:27 as "origin," "source," or "creation" (γένεσις, genesis).

=== In classical rabbinic interpretation ===
==== Wind ====
The Mekhilta of Rabbi Ishmael called the east wind "the mightiest of winds" and taught that God used the east wind to punish the generation of the Flood, the people of the Tower of Babel, the people of Sodom, the Egyptians with the plague of the locusts in Exodus 10:13, the Tribes of Judah and Benjamin, the Ten Tribes, Tyre, a wanton empire, and the wicked of Gehinnom.

=== In medieval Jewish interpretation ===
Baḥya ibn Paquda noted that Genesis 8:21, "God said in His heart," and Genesis 9:6, "for God made man in His image," imply that God has physical form and body parts. And Genesis 8:1, "and God remembered"; Genesis 8:21, "and God smelled the pleasing aroma"; Genesis 11:5, "and God came down," imply that God moves and takes bodily actions like human beings. Baḥya explained that necessity brought people to anthropomorphize God and describe God in terms of human attributes so that human listeners could grasp God in their minds. After doing so, people can learn that such description was only metaphorical, and that the truth is too fine, too sublime, too exalted, and too remote from the ability and powers of human minds to grasp. Baḥya advised wise thinkers to endeavor to remove the husk of the terms and their corporeality and ascend in their minds step by step to reach the true intended meaning according to the power and ability of their minds to grasp. Baḥya cautioned that one must be careful not to take descriptions of God's attributes literally or in a physical sense. Rather, one must know that they are metaphors, geared to what we can grasp with our powers of understanding, because of our urgent need to know God. But God is infinitely greater and loftier than all of these attributes.

=== In modern interpretation ===
Victor P. Hamilton observed that genealogies bracket narrative blocks in the opening chapters of Genesis.

1A: 5:32 genealogy (Noah's sons)

1B: 6:1–8 narrative (the sons of God)

1A^{1}: 6:9–10 genealogy (Noah's sons)

2A: 6:9–10 genealogy (Noah's sons)

2B: 6:11–9:17 narrative (the Flood)

2A^{1}: 9:18–19 genealogy (Noah's sons)

3A: 10:21–31 genealogy (Shemites)

3B: 11:1–9 narrative (Tower of Babel)

3A^{1}: 11:10–32 genealogy (Shemites)

Hamilton argued that this literary artistry provides another reason for the sequence of chapters 10 and 11.

Bernhard W. Anderson identified the following chiastic structure in the Flood story:

Transitional introduction (6:9–10)

1. Violence in God's creation (6:11–12)

2. First divine address: resolution to destroy (6:13–22)

3. Second divine address: command to enter the ark (7:1–10)

4. Beginning of the flood (7:11–16)

5. The rising flood waters (7:17–24)

GOD'S REMEMBRANCE OF NOAH (8:1)

6. The receding flood waters (8:1–5)

7. The drying of the earth (8:6–14)

8. Third divine address: command to leave the ark (8:15–19)

9. God's resolution to preserve order (8:20–22)

10. Fourth divine address: covenant blessing and peace (9:1–17)

Transitional conclusion (9:18–19)

Speiser read Genesis 7:4, 12; 8:6, 10, and 12, to reflect the Jahwist's chronology that the rains came down 40 days and nights, and the waters disappeared after 3 times 7 days, the whole deluge lasting thus 61 days. Whereas Speiser read the Priestly source, whose calendar is typically detailed down to the exact day of the given month, to report in Genesis 7:24 that the waters held their crest for 150 days and to report in Genesis 7:11 and 8:14 that they remained on the earth one year and 11 days.

=== In critical analysis ===
Diagram of the Documentary Hypothesis

Some scholars who follow the Documentary Hypothesis find evidence of four separate sources in the parashah. Thus some scholars consider the parashah to weave together two Flood story accounts composed by the Jahwist (sometimes abbreviated J) who wrote possibly as early as the 10th century BCE and the Priestly source who wrote in the 6th or 5th century BCE. One such scholar, Richard Elliott Friedman, attributes to the Jahwist Genesis 7:1–5, 7, 16b–20, 22–23; 8:2b–3a, 6, 8–12, 13b, and 20–22. And he attributes to the Priestly source Genesis 6:9b–22; 7:8–16, 21, 20; 8:1–2a, 3b-5, 7, 13a, and 14–19. For a similar distribution of verses, see the display of Genesis according to the Documentary Hypothesis at Wikiversity. Friedman also attributes to a late Redactor (sometimes abbreviated R) the introductory clause in Genesis 6:9a and to another source the report of Noah's age during the Flood in Genesis 7:6.

Friedman also attributes to the Jahwist the account of Noah's drunkenness and the cursing of Canaan in Genesis 9:18–27; the genealogies in Genesis 10:8–19, 21, and 24–30; and the story of the Tower of Babel in Genesis 11:1–9. He attributes to the Priestly source the account of the covenant of the rainbow in Genesis 9:1–17 and the genealogies in Genesis 10:1b–7, 20, 22–23, 31–32; and 11:27b–31. He attributes to the Redactor introductory clauses in Genesis 10:1a; 11:10a and 27a and the account of Terah in Genesis 11:31b and 32b. And he attributes to another source the genealogy of Shem at Genesis 11:11b–26 and 32a.

Ronald Hendel contrasted the differing conceptions of reality, God, and humans in the Jahwist and the Priestly sources. Hendel observed that in the Jahwist's account, God is subject to strong emotions like regret, wrath, compassion, and delight, while in the Priestly source, God is more transcendental and lacks emotion or regret. Hendel characterized the Priestly source as less anthropocentric and its concept of God as less anthropomorphic than the Jahwist's.

Gary Rendsburg, however, notes that the Flood story has many similarities with the Epic of Gilgamesh. He argues that several sources would be unlikely to track these plot elements from the Epic of Gilgamesh independently. Thus, Rendsburg argues that the Flood story was composed as a unified whole.

== Commandments ==
Maimonides cited the parashah for one positive commandment:

- To "be fruitful and multiply"

The Sefer ha-Chinuch, however, attributed the commandment to Genesis 1:28.

The Kitzur Shulchan Aruch read the words of Genesis 9:5, "And surely your blood of your lives will I require," to refer to "foolish pietists" who needlessly endanger their lives by refusing to be healed on the Sabbath. The Kitzur Shulchan Aruch taught that one overrides the Shabbat as well as other commandments (except for idol worship, incest, and murder) if there is danger to life and one who hastens to disregard the Sabbath for an ill person who is in danger is praiseworthy.

Similarly, the Kitzur Shulchan Aruch read the words of Genesis 9:5, "And surely your blood of your lives will I require," to support the proposition that one who commits suicide is considered an evildoer of the highest degree. For God created the world for a single individual, Adam, so anyone who destroys a soul destroys a whole world. The Kitzur Shulchan Aruch therefore taught that Jews should not carry out for one who committed suicide anything to honor that person, but Jews should bury the body after cleansing and dressing it in a shroud. The principle is that everything for honoring the living relatives should be done for them, as opposed to for the honor of the person who committed suicide.

The Kitzur Shulchan Aruch taught that upon arising in the morning, one should wash one's face in honor of one's Creator, as Genesis 9:6 states, "for in the image of God made He man."

== In the liturgy ==
God's dominion over the Flood in Genesis 7:6–8:14 is reflected in Psalm 29:10, which is in turn one of the six Psalms recited at the beginning of the Kabbalat Shabbat prayer service and again as the Torah is returned to the Torah ark at the end of the Shabbat morning Torah service.

Some Jews read the words "for in the image of God made He man" from Genesis 9:6 as they study chapter 3 of Pirkei Avot on a Sabbath between Passover and Rosh Hashanah. And then they encounter the discussion of the ten generations from Adam to the Flood and then the ten generations from Noah to Abraham (enumerated in Genesis 11:10–26) as they study chapter 5 of Pirkei Avot thereafter.

== Haftarah ==
A haftarah is a text selected from the books of Nevi'im ("The Prophets") that is read publicly in the synagogue after the reading of the Torah on Sabbath and holiday mornings. The haftarah usually has a thematic link to the Torah reading that precedes it.

The specific text read following Parashah Noach varies according to different traditions within Judaism. Examples are:

- for Ashkenazi Jews and Mizrahi Jews: Isaiah 54:1–55:5
- for Sephardi Jews: Isaiah 54:1–10
- for Yemenite Jews: Isaiah 54:1–55:3
- for Italian Jews and some Yemenite communities: Isaiah 54:1–55:5
- for Karaite Jews: Isaiah 54:9–55:12
- for Frankfurt am Main and Chabad Lubavitch: Isaiah 54:1–10

The parashah and haftarah both tell the power of God's covenant. The parashah and the haftarah both report God's covenant with Noah never again to destroy the earth by flood. In the parashah and the haftarah, God confesses to anger at human transgression. In the wake of God's punishment, Genesis 9:11,15 and Isaiah 54:10 and 55:3 all use the words "no ... more" (lo' 'od). The "righteousness" of Israel's children in Isaiah 54:14 echoes that Noah is "righteous" in his age in Genesis 6:9.

== Readings according to the triennial cycle ==
Jews who read the Torah according to the triennial cycle of Torah reading read the parashah according to the following schedule:

	Year 1	Year 2	Year 3
	2025, 2028, 2031 . . .	2026, 2029, 2032 . . .	2027, 2030, 2033 . . .
Reading	6:9–8:14	8:15–10:32	11:1–11:32
1	6:9–16	8:15–22	11:1–4
2	6:17–19	9:1–7	11:5–9
3	6:20–22	9:8–17	11:10–13
4	7:1–9	9:18–29	11:14–17
5	7:10–16	10:1–14	11:18–21
6	7:17–24	10:15–20	11:22–25
7	8:1–14	10:21–32	11:26–32
Maftir	8:12–14	10:26–32	11:29–32

== See also ==
- Curse of Ham
- Genesis flood narrative
- Noahide laws
- Noah in rabbinic literature
