= Biblical terminology for race =

Terms for races in the Bible

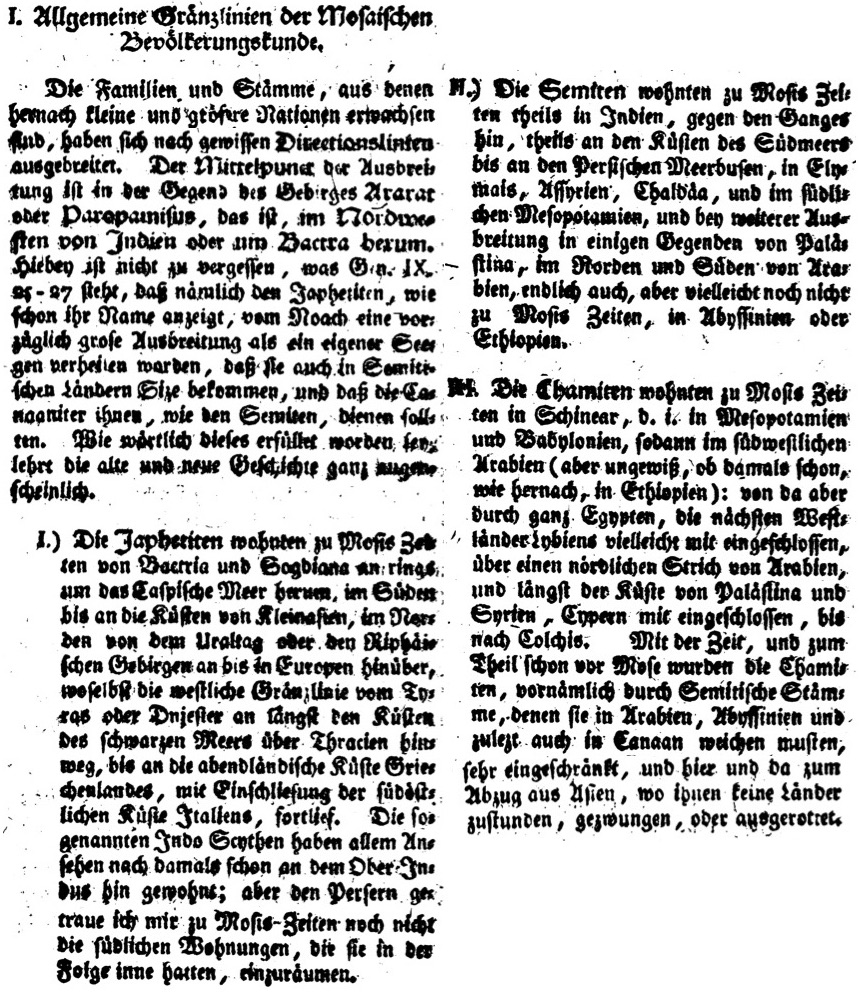
The first depiction of historical ethnology of the world separated into the biblical sons of Noah: Semites, Hamites and Japhetites, 1771, Gatterer's Einleitung in die Synchronistische Universalhistorie. Gatterer explains that modern history has shown the truth of the biblical prediction of Japhetite supremacy (Genesis 9:25–27). Click the image for a transcription of the text.

Since early modern times, a number of biblical ethnonyms from the Table of Nations in Genesis 10 have been used as a basis for classifying human "racial" (cosmetic phenotypical) categories and "national" (ethnolinguistic cultural) identities. The connection between Genesis 10 and contemporary ethnic groups began during classical antiquity, when authors such as Josephus, Hippolytus and Jerome analyzed the biblical list.

The early modern equation of the biblical Semites, Hamites and Japhetites with "racial" categories was coined at the Göttingen school of history in the late 18th century – in parallel with other, more secular terminologies for race, such as Blumenbach's fivefold color scheme.

== Classical analyses of Genesis 10 ==
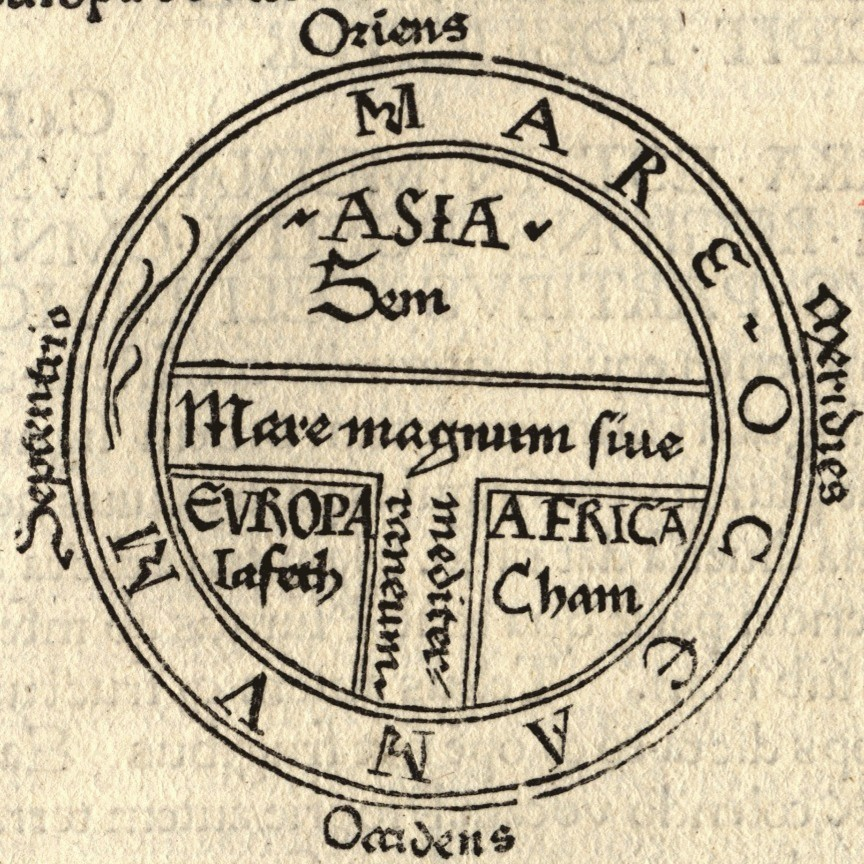
This T and O map, from the first printed version of Isidoor's Etymologiae, identifies the three known continents as populated by descendants of Sem (Shem), Iafeth (Japheth) and Cham (Ham).

The following sources attempted to equate the biblical Table of Nations with contemporary identities:

=== Flavius Josephus ===
Geographic identifications of Flavius Josephus, c. 100 AD

The 1st-century Jewish-Roman historian Josephus, in Antiquities of the Jews Book 1, chapter 6, was the first known author who assigned known ethnicities to some of the names listed in Genesis chapter 10. His assignments became the basis for most later authors, and were as follows:

- Gomer: "those whom the Greeks now call Galatians, [Galls,] but were then called Gomerites".
  - Aschanax (Ashkenaz): "Aschanaxians, who are now called by the Greeks Rheginians".
  - Riphath: "Ripheans, now called Paphlagonians".
  - Thrugramma (Togarmah): "Thrugrammeans, who, as the Greeks resolved, were named Phrygians".
- Magog: "Magogites, but who are by the Greeks called Scythians".
- Madai: "the Madeans, who are called Medes, by the Greeks".
- Javan: "Ionia, and all the Grecians".
  - Elisa: "Eliseans... they are now the Aeolians".
  - Tharsus (Tarshish): "Tharsians, for so was Cilicia of old called". He also derives the name of their city Tarsus from Tharsus.
  - Cethimus (Kittim): "The island Cethima: it is now called Cyprus". He also derives the Greek name of their city, which he spells Citius, from Cethimus.
- Thobel (Tubal): "Thobelites, who are now called Iberes".
- Mosoch (Meshech): "Mosocheni... now they are Cappadocians." He also derives the name of their capital Mazaca from Mosoch.
- Thiras (Tiras): "Thirasians; but the Greeks changed the name into Thracians".
- Chus (Cush): "Ethiopians... even at this day, both by themselves and by all men in Asia, called Chusites".
  - Sabas (Seba): Sabeans
  - Evilas (Havilah): "Evileans, who are called Getuli".
  - Sabathes (Sabta): "Sabathens, they are now called by the Greeks Astaborans".
  - Sabactas (Sabteca): Sabactens
  - Ragmus (Raamah): Ragmeans
    - Judadas (Dedan): "Judadeans, a nation of the western Ethiopians".
    - Sabas (Sheba): Sabeans
- Mesraim (Misraim): Egypt, which he says is called Mestre in his country.
  - "Now all the children of Mesraim, being eight in number, possessed the country from Gaza to Egypt, though it retained the name of one only, the Philistim; for the Greeks call part of that country Palestine. As for the rest, Ludieim, and Enemim, and Labim, who alone inhabited in Libya, and called the country from himself, Nedim, and Phethrosim, and Chesloim, and Cephthorim, we know nothing of them besides their names; for the Ethiopic war which we shall describe hereafter, was the cause that those cities were overthrown."
- Phut: Ancient Libya. He states that a river and region "in the country of Moors" was still called Phut by the Greeks, but that it had been renamed "from one of the sons of Mesraim, who was called Lybyos".
- Canaan: Judea, which he called "from his own name Canaan".
  - Sidonius (Sidon): The city of Sidonius, "called by the Greeks Sidon".
  - Amathus (Hamathite): "Amathine, which is even now called Amathe by the inhabitants, although the Macedonians named it Epiphania, from one of his posterity."
  - Arudeus (Arvadite): "the island Aradus".
  - Arucas (Arkite): "Arce, which is in Libanus".
  - "But for the seven others [sons of Canaan], Chetteus, Jebuseus, Amorreus, Gergesus, Eudeus, Sineus, Samareus, we have nothing in the sacred books but their names, for the Hebrews overthrew their cities".
- Elam: "Elamites, the ancestors of the Persians".
- Ashur: "Assyrians, and their city Niniveh built by Ashur.
- Arphaxad: "Arphaxadites, who are now called Chaldeans".
  - Sala
    - Heber (Eber): "from whom they originally called the Jews Hebrews".
      - Phaleg (Peleg): He notes that he was so named "because he was born at the dispersion of the nations to their several countries; for Phaleg among the Hebrews signifies division".
      - Joctan
        - "Elmodad, Saleph, Asermoth, Jera, Adoram, Aizel, Decla, Ebal, Abimael, Sabeus, Ophir, Euilat, and Jobab. These inhabited from Cophen, an Indian river, and in part of Asia adjoining to it."
- Aram: "Aramites, which the Greeks called Syrians".
  - Uz: "Uz founded Trachonitis and Damascus: this country lies between Palestine and Celesyria".
  - Ul (Hul): Armenia
  - Gather (Gether): Bactrians
  - Mesa (Mesh): "Mesaneans; it is now called Charax Spasinu".
- Laud (Lud): "Laudites, which are now called Lydians".

=== Hippolytus ===
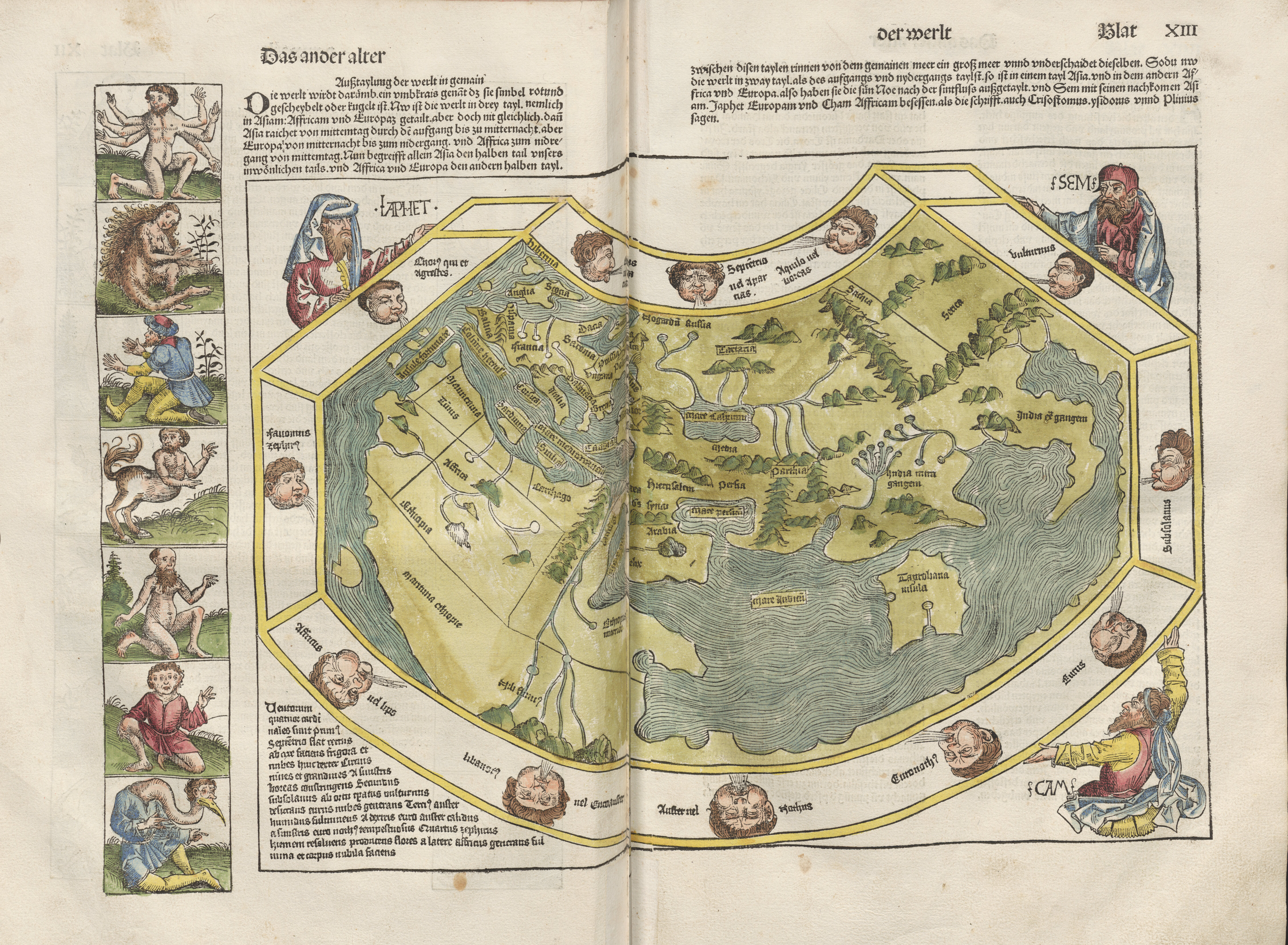
Woodcut from the Nuremberg Chronicle, showing Shem, Ham and Japheth over their corners of the world

Hippolytus of Rome, in his Diamerismos (c. 234, existing in numerous Latin and Greek copies), made another attempt to assign ethnicities to the names in Genesis 10. It is thought to have been based on the Book of Jubilees.

Its differences versus that of Josephus are shown below:

- Gomer – Cappadocians
  - Ashkenaz – Sarmatians
  - Riphath – Sauromatians
  - Togarmah – Armenians
- Magog – Galatians, Celts
- Javan
  - Elishah – Sicels (Chron Pasc: Trojans and Phrygians)
  - Tarshish – Iberians, Tyrrhenians
  - Kittim – Macedonians, Romans, Latins
- Tubal – "Hettali" (?)
- Meshech – Illyrians
- Misraim
  - Ludim – Lydians
  - Anamim – Pamphylians
  - Pathrusim – Lycians (var.: Cretans)
  - Caphtorim – Cilicians
- Put – Troglodytes
  - Canaan – Punic people and Phoenicians
    - Arkite – Tripolitanians
- Lud – Halizones
- Arpachshad
  - Cainan – "those east of the Sarmatians" (one variant)
    - Joktan
      - Elmodad – Indians
      - Saleph – Bactrians
      - Hazamaveth, Sheba – Arabs
      - Adoram – Carmanians
      - Uzal – Arians (var.: Parthians)
      - Abimael – Hyrcanians
      - Obal – Scythians
      - Ophir – Armenians
      - Deklah – Gedrosians
- Aram – "Etes" ?
  - Hul – Lydians (var: Colchians)
  - Gether – "Gaspeni" ?
  - Mash – Mossynoeci (var: Mosocheni)

The Chronography of 354, the Panarion by Epiphanius of Salamis (c. 375), the Chronicon Paschale (c. 627), the History of Albania by the Georgian historian Movses Kaghankatvatsi (7th century), and the Synopsis of Histories by John Skylitzes (c. 1057) follow the identifications of Hippolytus.

=== Jerome ===
Jerome, writing c. 390, provided an 'updated' version of Josephus' identifications in his Hebrew Questions on Genesis. His list is substantially identical to that of Josephus in almost all respects, but with the following notable differences:

- Thubal, son of Japheth: "Iberians, who are also the Spaniards from whom derive the Celtiberians, although certain people suppose them to be the Italians."
- Gether, son of Aram: "Acarnanii or Carians"
- Mash, son of Aram: Maeones

=== Isidore ===
The scholar Isidore of Seville, in his Etymologiae (c. 600), repeats all of Jerome's identifications, but with these minor changes:

- Joktan, son of Eber: Indians
- Saleph, son of Joktan: Bactrians
- Magog, son of Japheth: "Scythians and Goths"
- Ashkenaz, son of Gomer: "Sarmatians, whom the Greeks call Rheginians".

Isidore's identifications for Japheth's sons were repeated in the Historia Brittonum attributed to Nennius. Isidore's identifications also became the basis for numerous later mediaeval scholars, remaining so until the Age of Discovery prompted newer theories, such as that of Benito Arias Montano (1571), who proposed connecting Meshech with Moscow, and Ophir with Peru.

=== Samuel Bochart ===
Published in 1646, Samuel Bochart's Geographia Sacra seu Phaleg et Canaan was the first detailed analysis of the Generations of Noah since classical times, becoming – and remaining – the locus classicus for such scholarship.

== Early modern use of racial terminology ==
=== Göttingen school of history ===
Scholars at the Göttingen school of history, which played an important role in creating a "scientific" basis for historical research, coined the modern racial definitions of the terms Semitic, Hamitic and Japhetic. The primary scholars were Johann Christoph Gatterer, August Ludwig von Schlözer and Johann Gottfried Eichhorn.

Gatterer's 1771 Einleitung in die Synchronistische Universalhistorie ("Introduction to the Universal Synchronistic History") was the first publication to use these terms in an ethnic sense. Gatterer's description was as follows:

Original German	English translation
Allgemeine Gränzlinien der Mosaischen Bevölkerungskunde. Die Familien und Stämme, aus denen hernach kleine und grösere Nationen erwachsen sind, haben sich nach gewissen Directionslinien ausgebreitet. Der Mittel punct der Ausbreitung ist in der Gegend des Gebirges Ararat oder Paropamisus, das ist, im Nordwesten von Indien oder um Bactra herum. Hiebey ist nicht zu vergessen, was Gen. IX, 25-27 steht, daß nämlich den Japhetiten, wie schon ihr Name anzeigt, vom Noach eine vorzüglich grose Ausbreitung als ein eigener Siegen verheisen worden, daß sie auch in Semitischen Ländern Size bekommen, und daß die Canaaniter ihnen, wie den Semiten, dienen sollten. Wie wörtlich dieses erfüllet worden sey, lehrt die alte und neue Geschichte ganz augenscheinlich. I) Die Japhetiten wohnten zu Mosis Zeiten von Bactria und Sogdiana an rings um das Caspische Meer herum, im Süden bis an die Küsten von Kleinasien, im Norden von dem Uraltag oder den Riphäisschen Gebirgen an bis in Europen hinüber, woselbst die westliche Gränzlinie vom Tyras oder Dnjester an längst den Küsten des schwarzen Meers über Thracien hinweg, bis an die abendländische Küste Griechenlandes, mit Einschliesung der südöstlichen Küste Italiens, fortlief. Die sogenannten Indo-Scythen haben allem Ansehen nach damals schon an dem Ober-Indus hin gewohnt; aber den Persern getraue ich mir zu Mosis-Zeiten noch niche die südlichen Wohnungen, die sie in der Folge inne hatten, einzuräumen. II) Die Semiten wohnten zu Mosis Zeiten theils in Indien, gegen den Ganges hin, theils an den Küsten des Südmeers bis an den Persischen Meerbusen, in Elymais, Assyrien, Chaldäa, und im südlischen Mesopotamien, und bey weiterer Ausbreitung in einigen Gegenden von Palästina, im Norden und Süden von Arabien, endlich auch, aber vielleicht noch nicht zu Mosis Zeiten, in Abyssinien oder Ethiopien. III) Die Chamiten wohnten zu Mosis Zeiten in Schinear, das ist in Mesopotamien und Babylonien, sodann im südwestlichen Arabien (aber ungewiß, ob damals schon, wie hernach, in Ethiopien): von da aber durch ganz Egypten, die nächsten Westfänder Lybiens vielleicht mir eingeschlossen, über einen nördlichen Strich von Arabien, und längst der Küste von Palästina und Syrien, Cypern mit eingeschlossen, bis nach Colchis. Mit der Zeit, und zum Theil schon vor Mose wurden die Chamiten, vornämlich durch Semitische Stämme, denen sie in Arabien, Abyssinien und zulezt auch in Canaan weichen musten, sehr eingeschränkt, und hier und da zum Abzug aus Asien, wo ihnen keine Länder zustunden, gezwungen, oder ausgerottet.	General Outline of Mosaic Population Studies. The families and tribes, from which small and larger nations subsequently grew, have spread in various directions. The middle point of the spread is in the area of the mountains of Ararat or Paropamisus, that is, in the northwest of India or around Bactra. It is not to be forgotten what Genesis 9:25–27 states: that the Japhetites, as their name indicates, were successfully spread by Noah as a result of their victories, that they also have size in Semitic countries, and that the Canaanites, like the Semites, should be subservient. The ancient and modern stories clearly show how this has been literally fulfilled. I) In Moses's time, the Japhetites lived from Bactria and Sogdiana around the Caspian Sea, in the south to the coasts of Asia Minor, in the North from across the Urals or the Riphaise Mountains to in Europen, even the western line from the Tyras or Dniester on the coasts of the Black Sea long ago across Thrace, to the western coast of Greece, including the southeastern coast of Italy. The so-called Indo-Scythians, according to reputation, already lived on the Upper Indus back then; but would not dare to propose the Persians in Moses's days the southern regions that they subsequently had. II) During the time of Moses, the Semites lived partly in India, towards the Ganges, partly on the coasts of the South Sea to the Persian Gulf, in Elymais, Assyria, Chaldea, and in southern Mesopotamia, and with further expansion in some areas of Palestine, in the north and south of Arabia, finally too, but maybe not yet in Moses's time, in Abyssinia or Ethiopia. III) During the time of Moses, the Hamites lived in Schinear, that is in Mesopotamia and Babylonia, then in southwestern Arabia (but uncertain, whether back then, as later, in Ethiopia): from there, however, through all of Egypt, perhaps the closest west of Libya to me, across a northern line from Arabia, and long since the coast from Palestine and Syria, including Cyprus, to Colchis. Over time, and in part even before Moses, the Hamites became very restricted, primarily through Semitic tribes, whom they had to give way in Arabia, Abyssinia and, more recently, also in Canaan, and here and there to withdraw from Asia, where no countries were entitled to them, forced, or exterminated.

== Other interpretations ==
=== Descendants of Japheth ===
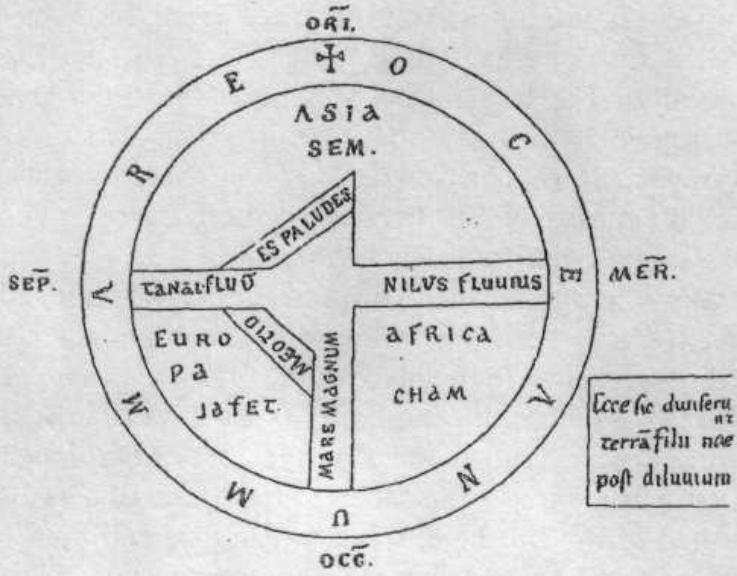
The oldest known map of Europe. The caption reads "Ecce sic diviserunt terram filii Noe post diluvium" (Lo thus did the sons of Noah divide the world after the Flood).

The Greek Septuagint (LXX) text of Genesis includes an additional son of Japheth, "Elisa", between Javan and Tubal; however, as this name is found in no other ancient source, nor in I Chronicles, he is almost universally agreed to be a duplicate of Elisha, son of Javan. The presence of Elisa and of Cainan son of Arpachshad (below) in the Greek Bible accounts for the traditional enumeration among early Christian sources of 72 names, as opposed to the 70 names found in Jewish sources and Western Christian sources.

- Gomer: the Cimmerians, a people from the northern Black Sea, made incursions into Anatolia in the eighth and early seventh centuries BCE before being confined to Cappadocia.
  - Ashkenaz: A people of the Black and Caspian sea areas, much later associated with German and East European Jews. The Ashkuza, who lived on the upper Euphrates in Armenia expelled the Cimmerians from their territory, and in Jeremiah 51:27 were said to march against Babylon along with two other northern kingdoms.
  - Riphath (Diphath in Chronicles): Josephus identification Riphath with the Paphlagonians of later antiquity, but this appears to have been no more than a guess; the Book of Jubilees identifies the name with the "Riphean Mountains", equated with the Causcasus in Classical sources, and the general understanding seems to have been invaders from the Causcuses who were settled in Armenia or Cappadocia.
  - Togarmah: Associated with Anatolia in Ezekiel. Later Armenian historians claimed Togarmah as an ancestor.
- Magog: Associated in Ezekiel with Gog, a king of Lydia, and thereby with Anatolia. The first century CE Jewish historian Josephus stated that Magog was identical with the Scythians, but modern scholars are sceptical of this and place Magog simply somewhere in Anatolia.
- Madai: The Medes, from an area now in northwest Iran.
- Javan: This name is universally agreed to refer to the Ionians (Greeks) of the western and southern coast of Anatolia.
  - Elishah: Possibly Elaioussa, an island off the coast of Cilicia, or an old name for the island of Cyprus.
  - Tarshish (Tarshishah in Chronicles): Candidates include (Tartessos) in Spain and Tharros in Sardinia, both of which appear unlikely, and Tarsus in Cilicia, which appears more likely despite some linguistic difficulties.
  - Kittim: Originally the inhabitants of Kition in Cyprus, later the entire island; in the Dead Sea Scrolls the Kittim appear to be the Romans.
  - Dodanim (Rodanim in Chronicles): Inhabitants of Rhodes.
- Tubal: Tubal and Meshech always appear as a pair in the Old Testament. The name Tubal is connected with Tabal and Greek Tipaprivoi, a people of Cappadocia, in the north-east of Anatolia.
- Meshech: Mushki/Muski had its capital at Gordium and fused with the kingdom of Phrygia by the 8th century.
- Tiras: Josephus and late Rabbinical writers associated Tiras with Thrace, the part of Europe opposite Anatolia, but all the other sons of Japheth are located in Anatolia itself and it is possible that Tiras may refer to Thracians inhabiting westernmost Anatolia; it has also been associated with some of the Sea Peoples such as Tursha and Tyrrhenians, but this is considered unlikely.

=== Descendants of Ham ===
- Cush: The biblical transliteration of the Egyptian name for Nubia or Ethiopia; the "sons of Cush" which follow are various locations on the Arabian and possibly African coasts bordering the Red Sea.
  - Seba. Has been connected with both Yemen and Ethiopia, with much confusion with Sheba below.
  - Havilah, son of Cush
  - Sabtah
  - Raamah
    - Sheba. Has been connected with Sabaeans and peoples on either side of the narrowest part of the Red Sea.
    - Dedan, son of Raamah
  - Sabtechah, son of Cush
  - Nimrod: in verses 10–12 he is the founder of a list of Mesopotamian cities, and the biblical tradition elsewhere identifies him with northern Mesopotamia or Assyria. His location (Mesopotamia) is something of an anomaly, in that the other sons of Cush are connected with Africa or the Red Sea, and he is possibly a late insertion resulting from a confusion between the African Cush and a quite different Cush, the eponym (ancestor) of the Kassites.
- Mizraim: Egypt.
  - Ludim, offspring of Mizraim.
  - Anamim, offspring of Mizraim.
  - Lehabim, offspring of Mizraim.
  - Naphtuhim, offspring of Mizraim.
  - Pathrusim, offspring of Mizraim.
  - Casluhim ("out of whom came Philistim" – Genesis 10:14, 1Chronicles 1:12)
  - Caphtorim: Probably the island of Crete. According to Deuteronomy 2:23, Caphtorim settled in Gaza, an important Philistinian city.
- Phut: the Septuagint translates this as Libyans, which would be in accordance with the north–to–south progression in the listing of Ham's descendants, but some scholars have suggested Punt, the Egyptian name for Somalia.
- Canaan: The strip of land west of the Jordan River including modern Lebanon and parts of Syria, and the varied peoples who lived there.
  - Sidon: The main Phoenician city, often treated as synonymous with Phoenicia.
  - Heth: Probably the ancestor of the biblical Hittites, although the Hittites of Anatolia had no ethnic or linguistic ties with the peoples of Canaan.
  - "the Jebusite", offspring of Canaan.
  - "the Amorite": Generic name for West Semitic peoples of the Fertile Crescent.
  - "the Girgasites", offspring of Canaan
  - "the Hivite", offspring of Canaan
  - "the Arkite", offspring of Canaan.
  - "the Sinite", offspring of Canaan.
  - "the Arvadite", offspring of Canaan.
  - "the Zemarite", offspring of Canaan.
  - "the Hamathite", offspring of Canaan.

Beginning in the 9th century with the Jewish grammarian Judah ibn Quraysh, a relationship between the Semitic and Cushitic languages was seen; modern linguists group these two families, along with the Egyptian, Berber, Chadic, and Omotic language groups into the larger Afro-Asiatic language family. In addition, languages in the southern half of Africa are now seen as belonging to several distinct families independent of the Afro-Asiatic group. Some now discarded Hamitic theories have become viewed as racist; in particular a theory proposed in the 19th century by Speke, that the Tutsi were supposedly of some Hamitic ancestry and thus inherently superior.

The 17th-century Jesuit, Athanasius Kircher, thought that the Chinese had also descended from Ham, via Egyptians.

=== Descendants of Shem ===
- Elam: A kingdom east of Assyria and Babylonia and along the Persian Gulf. The Elamites called their land Haltamti and had an empire (capital Susa) in what is now Khuzistan, modern Iran. Elamite is not a Semitic language, but a Language Isolate.
- Ashur: Assyria, which was not West Semitic like the Hebrews, but an East Semitic speaking kingdom in Upper Mesopotamia. In the much older Assyrian tradition itself, Ashur is the name of the chief deity in Mesopotamian religion and the name of the city state of Assur.
- Arpachshad: Flavius Josephus links Arpachshad with Chaldaea in his Antiquities of the Jews, stating: "Arphaxad named the Arphaxadites, who are now called Chaldeans."

- Cainan is listed as the son of Arpachshad and father of Shelah in the Septuagint, a Greek translation of the Hebrew bible (the Masoretic Text) made in the last few centuries before the modern era. The name is omitted in the Hebrew bible. The genealogy of Jesus in St. Luke 3:36, which is taken from the Septuagint rather than the Hebrew text, include the name.
- Salah (also transcribed Shelah) son of Arpachshad (or Cainan).

- Eber son of Shelah: The ancestor of Abraham and the Hebrews, he has a significant place as the 14th from Adam.

- Peleg: The name means "division," and may refer to the division of the peoples in the Tower of Babel incident which follows, or to Peleg and his descendants being "divided out" as the chosen people of God.
- Joktan: The name is Arabic, and his 13 "sons," so far as they can be identified, correspond to the west and southwest of the Arabian peninsula.

- Almodad, son of Joktan.
- Sheleph, son of Joktan.
- Hazarmaveth, son of Joktan.
- Jerah, son of Joktan.
- Hadoram, son of Joktan.
- Uzal, son of Joktan.
- Diklah son of Joktan.
- Obal, son of Joktan.
- Abimael, son of Joktan.
- Sheba, son of Joktan.
- Ophir, son of Joktan.
- Havilah, son of Joktan.
- Jobab, son of Joktan.

- Lud: The kingdom of Lydia in eastern Anatolia. However, Lydia was Indo-Anatolian speaking and not West Semitic and not geographically near the other "sons of Shem", which makes its presence in the list difficult to explain.
- Aram: Aramaeans: Mesopotamia and Syria.
  - Uz, son of Aram.
  - Hul, son of Aram.
  - Gether, son of Aram.
  - Mash, son of Aram (1 Chronicles has Meshech).

== See also ==
- Color terminology for race
- Genealogies in the Bible
- Generations of Noah
- Genetic history of the Middle East
- Race and appearance of Jesus

== Bibliography ==
- Philip Alexander (1988). "Retelling the Old Testament". It is Written: Scripture Citing Scripture: Essays in Honour of Barnabas Lindars, SSF. CUP Archive. ISBN 9780521323475.
- Bøe, Sverre (2001). Gog and Magog: Ezekiel 38–39 as pre-text for Revelation 19, 17–21 and 20, 7–10. Mohr Siebeck. ISBN 9783161475207.
- Gmirkin, Russell (2006). Berossus and Genesis, Manetho and Exodus: Hellenistic Histories and the Date of the Pentateuch. Bloomsbury Publishing USA. ISBN 9780567134394.
- Daniel A. Machiela (2009). "A Comparative Commentary on the Earths Division". The Dead Sea Genesis Apocryphon: A New Text and Translation With Introduction and Special Treatment of Columns 13–17. BRILL. ISBN 9789004168145.
- Matthews, K.A. (1996). Genesis 1–11:26. B&H Publishing Group. ISBN 9781433675515.
- Jacques T. A. G. M. Ruiten (2000). Primaeval History Interpreted: The Rewriting of Genesis 1–11 in the Book of Jubilees. BRILL. ISBN 9789004116580.
- Towner, Wayne Sibley (2001). Genesis. Westminster John Knox Press. ISBN 9780664252564.
- Uehlinger, Christof (1999). "Nimrod". In Van der Toorn, Karel; Becking, Bob; Van der Horst, Pieter (eds.). Dictionary of Deities and Demons in the Bible. Brill. ISBN 9780802824912.
