= Biblical Hittites =

Group of people mentioned in the Hebrew Bible

The Hittites, also spelled Hethites, (Note: The Christian Standard Bible refers to the "Hethites".) were a group of people mentioned in the Hebrew Bible. Under the names בני-חת (bny-ḥt "children of Heth", who was the son of Canaan) and חתי (ḥty "native of Heth"), they are described several times as living in or near Canaan between the time of Abraham (estimated to be between 2000 BC and 1500 BC) and the time of Ezra after the return of the Jews from the Babylonian exile (around 450 BC). Their ancestor was Heth (Hebrew: חֵת, Modern: Ḥet, Tiberian: Ḥēṯ).

In the late 19th century, the biblical Hittites were identified with a newly discovered Indo-European-speaking empire of Anatolia, a major regional power through most of the second millennium BC, who therefore came to be known as the Hittites. This nomenclature is used today as a matter of convention, regardless of debates about possible identities between the Anatolian Hittite Empire and the biblical Hittites.

== Identification hypotheses ==
According to Genesis, the Hittite Ephron sold Abraham the cave of Machpelah in Hebron for use as a family tomb. Later, Abraham's grandson Esau married wives from the Hittites.

In the Book of Joshua 1:4, when the LORD says to Joshua, "From the wilderness and this Lebanon even unto the great river, the river Euphrates, all the land of the Hittites, and unto the great sea toward the going down of the sun, shall be your border", this "land of the Hittites" on Canaan's border is seen to stretch between Lebanon and the Euphrates, and from there toward the setting Sun (i.e., to the west).

According to the Book of Judges 1:26, when the Israelites captured Bethel, they allowed one man to escape, and he went to the "land of the Hittites" where he founded the settlement of Luz. In King Solomon's era the Hittites are depicted in the Hebrew Bible along with Syria as among his powerful neighbors.

From around 1900, archaeologists were aware of a country established in Anatolia and known to Assyrians as "Hatti". Because it was initially assumed that the people of Hatti were identical to the Hetti of the Hebrew Bible, the term Hittite Empire is still today used to describe the Anatolian state. Their language is known to have been a member of the Indo-European family. Because its speakers were originally based in Kanesh, they called their language "Neshili". The former inhabitants of Hatti and Hattusas are now called Hattites; and their Hattic language was not Indo-European, but is of unknown linguistic relationship.

After the fall of the Hittite Empire around 1178 BC, a remnant of them, still using the name "people of Hatti", established some city-states in the region of northern Syria. Therefore, these are usually assumed to be the Hittites mentioned in Solomon's time.

=== The case for identity ===
Some scholars take the view that the two peoples are identical. Apart from the similarity in names, the Anatolian Hittites were a powerful political entity in the region before the collapse of their empire in the 14th-12th centuries BC and so one would expect them to be mentioned in the Bible, just as the ḤTY post-Exodus are. Moreover, in the account of the conquest of Canaan, the Hittites are said to dwell "in the mountains" and "towards the north" of Canaan, a description that matches the general direction and geography of the original Hittite Empire, which had been influential in the region prior to the Battle of Kadesh.

Modern academics propose, based on much onomastic and archaeological evidence, that Anatolian populations moved south into Canaan as part of the waves of Sea Peoples who were migrating along the Mediterranean coastline at the time of the collapse of the Hittite Empire. Many kings of local city-states are shown to have had Hittite and Luwian names in the Late Bronze to Early Iron Age transition period. Indeed, even the name of Mount Zion may be Hittite in origin.

=== The case for separation ===
Because of the perceived discrepancy between the picture of the Hittites as developed in the Bible and the archaeological discoveries, some biblical scholars reject Archibald Sayce's identification of the two peoples, and believe that the similarity in names is only a coincidence. For example E. A. Speiser, referring to "the children of Heth" in the Book of Genesis writes "For reasons of both history and geography, it is most unlikely that this group name has any direct connection either with the Hattians of Anatolia or with their 'Hittite' successors."

=== Intermediate hypotheses ===
Trevor Bryce suggests that biblical references to Hittites may be separated into two distinct groups. The first, the majority, are to a Canaanite tribe as encountered by Abraham and his family. The names of these Hittites are for the most part of a Semitic type; for example Ephron at Genesis 23:8–17 etc., Judith at Genesis 26:34 and Zohar at Genesis 23:8. These were presumably the Hittites who were subject to Solomon (1 Kings 11:1–2, 1 Kings 9:20–21, 2 Chronicles 8:7) and who were elsewhere in conflict with the Israelites (Deuteronomy 20:17, Judges 3:5). They were a small group living in the hills, and clearly to be distinguished from the Hittites of the Anatolian Kingdom.

But there are other biblical references which are not compatible with the notion of a small Canaanite hill tribe. Most notable among these is 2 Kings 7:6: "For the Lord had made the host of the Syrians to hear a noise of chariots, and a noise of horses, even the noise of a great host: and they said one to another, Lo, the king of Israel hath hired against us the kings of the Hittites, and the kings of the Egyptians, to come upon us."

This conveys the impression that the Hittite kings were commensurate in importance and power with the Egyptian pharaohs. A similar impression is conveyed by 2 Chronicles 1:17: "And they fetched up, and brought forth out of Egypt a chariot for six hundred shekels of silver, and a horse for a hundred and fifty: and so brought they out horses for all the kings of the Hittites, and for the kings of Syria, by their means." In these cases there can be little doubt that the references are to the neo-Hittite kingdoms of Syria.

If the references to the Canaanite tribe are distinct from those to the neo-Hittite kingdom, the similarity between the names (only two significant consonants) could easily be due to chance.

== List of Biblical references ==
Listed below are all the occurrences of the words "Heth", "Hittite" or "Hittites" in the King James Bible. (Note: Occurrences were found through a University of Virginia search service. The same information is available in book form in Jones. Compare also the occurrences of cheth (H2845) and chittiy (H2850) in Strong's Concordance.) The citations were arranged according to the epoch in which the events in question are supposed to have occurred. (Note: Note that this is not always the time in which the words were actually written. In particular, the covenant with Abraham concerning the future conquest of Canaan is treated as if it were contemporary with the latter. The epochs are indicated by the names of the biblical characters (Patriarchs, Judges, Kings or Prophets) prominent at the time.)

=== From Noah to Abraham ===
The biblical view of the genetic relationships among humanity is set forth in Genesis 10 (the "Table of Nations"), where various peoples are described as different lines of descent from Noah. In particular, Canaan is one of the sons of Ham, who is also said to be the ancestor of the Egyptians and the Philistines. The sons of Canaan are given as Sidon, Heth, then the Jebusites, Amorites, Girgasites, Hivites, Arkites, Sinites, Arvadites, Zemarites, and the Hamathites.

==== Noah ====
- Genesis 10:1 "Now these are the generations of the sons of Noah, Shem, Ham, and Japheth: and unto them were sons born after the flood. [...] 6 And the sons of Ham; Cush, and Mizraim, and Phut, and Canaan. 7 And the sons of Cush; Seba, and Havilah, and Sabtah, and Raamah, and Sabtecha: and the sons of Raamah; Sheba, and Dedan. 8 And Cush begat Nimrod [...] 10 And the beginning of his kingdom was Babel, and Erech, and Accad, [...]. 13 And Mizraim begat Ludim, and Anamim, and Lehabim, and Naphtuhim, 14 And Pathrusim, and Casluhim, (out of whom came Philistim,) and Caphtorim. 15 And Canaan begat Sidon his firstborn, and Heth, 16 And the Jebusite, and the Amorite, and the Girgasite, 17 And the Hivite, and the Arkite, and the Sinite, 18 And the Arvadite, and the Zemarite, and the Hamathite: and afterward were the families of the Canaanites spread abroad. 19 And the border of the Canaanites was from Sidon, as thou comest to Gerar, unto Gaza; as thou goest, unto Sodom, and Gomorrah, and Admah, and Zeboim, even unto Lasha. 20 These are the sons of Ham, after their families, after their tongues, in their countries, and in their nations."
- 1 Chronicles 1:13 "And Canaan begat Zidon his firstborn, and Heth, [...]"

=== From Abraham to Egypt ===
In this period, which is conjectured to start sometime after 2000 BC and end sometime before 1200 BC, the "children of Heth" (בני-חת, BNY-HT) and the label "Hittite" (HTY) are mentioned multiple times, but referring to essentially only two events.

In Genesis 23:2 towards the end of Abraham's life, he was staying in Hebron, on lands belonging to the "children of Heth", and from them he obtained a plot of land with a cave to bury his wife Sarah. One of them, Ephron, is labeled "the Hittite", several times. This deal is mentioned three more times (with almost the same words), upon the deaths of Abraham and Jacob.

Decades later, in Genesis 26:34, Abraham's grandson Esau is said to have taken two Hittite wives, and a Hivite one. This claim is repeated, with somewhat different names, in Genesis 36:2. In Genesis 27:46, Rebekah is worried that Jacob will do the same.

==== Abraham ====
- Genesis 23:2-20: "And Sarah died in Kirjath-arba; the same is Hebron in the land of Canaan: and Abraham came to mourn for Sarah, and to weep for her. 3 And Abraham stood up from before his dead, and spake unto the sons of Heth, saying, 4 I am a stranger and a sojourner with you: give me a possession of a burying place with you, that I may bury my dead out of my sight. 5 And the children of Heth answered Abraham, saying unto him, 6 Hear us, my lord: thou art a mighty prince among us [or 'a prince of God among us']: in the choice of our sepulchres bury thy dead; none of us shall withhold from thee his sepulchre, but that thou mayest bury thy dead. 7 And Abraham stood up, and bowed himself to the people of the land, even to the children of Heth. 8 And he communed with them, saying, If it be your mind that I should bury my dead out of my sight; hear me, and intreat for me to Ephron the son of Zohar, 9 That he may give me the cave of Machpelah, which he hath, which is in the end of his field; for as much money as it is worth he shall give it me for a possession of a burying place amongst you. 10 And Ephron dwelt among the children of Heth: and Ephron the Hittite answered Abraham in the audience of the children of Heth, even of all that went in at the gate of his city, saying, 11 Nay, my lord, hear me: the field give I thee, and the cave that is therein, I give it thee; in the presence of the sons of my people give I it thee: bury thy dead. [...] 16 And Abraham hearkened unto Ephron; and Abraham weighed to Ephron the silver, which he had named in the audience of the sons of Heth, four hundred shekels of silver, current money with the merchant. 17 And the field of Ephron, which was in Machpelah, which was before Mamre, the field, and the cave which was therein, and all the trees that were in the field, that were in all the borders round about, were made sure 18 Unto Abraham for a possession in the presence of the children of Heth, before all that went in at the gate of his city. 19 And after this, Abraham buried Sarah his wife in the cave of the field of Machpelah before Mamre: the same is Hebron in the land of Canaan. 20 And the field, and the cave that is therein, were made sure unto Abraham for a possession of a buryingplace by the sons of Heth."
- Genesis 25:8 "Then Abraham gave up the ghost, and died in a good old age, an old man, and full of years; and was gathered to his people. 9 And his sons Isaac and Ishmael buried him in the cave of Machpelah, in the field of Ephron the son of Zohar the Hittite, which is before Mamre; 10 The field which Abraham purchased of the sons of Heth: there was Abraham buried, and Sarah his wife."

==== Esau and Jacob ====
- Genesis 26:34 "And Esau was forty years old when he took to wife Judith the daughter of Beeri the Hittite, and Bashemath the daughter of Elon the Hittite: 35 Which were a grief of mind unto Isaac and to Rebekah."
- Genesis 27:46 "And Rebekah said to Isaac, I am weary of my life because of the daughters of Heth: if Jacob take a wife of the daughters of Heth, such as these which are of the daughters of the land, what good shall my life do me?"
- Genesis 36:2 "Esau took his wives of the daughters of Canaan; Adah the daughter of Elon the Hittite, and Aholibamah the daughter of Anah the daughter of Zibeon the Hivite; 3 And Bashemath Ishmael's daughter, sister of Nebajoth."
- Genesis 49:29 "And he [Jacob] charged them, and said unto them, I am to be gathered unto my people: bury me with my fathers in the cave that is in the field of Ephron the Hittite 30 In the cave that is in the field of Machpelah, which is before Mamre, in the land of Canaan, which Abraham bought with the field of Ephron the Hittite for a possession of a buryingplace. 31 There they buried Abraham and Sarah his wife; there they buried Isaac and Rebekah his wife; and there I buried Leah. 32 The purchase of the field and of the cave that is therein was from the children of Heth."
- Genesis 50:13 "For his [Jacob] sons carried him into the land of Canaan, and buried him in the cave of the field of Machpelah, which Abraham bought with the field for a possession of a burying place of Ephron the Hittite, before Mamre."

This passage refers to Jacob being buried in Machpelah. Joseph was buried in Shechem (Joshua 24.32): "And the bones of Joseph, which the children of Israel brought up out of Egypt, buried they in Shechem, in the parcel of ground which Jacob bought of the sons of Hamor the father of Shechem for a hundred pieces of money; and they became the inheritance of the children of Joseph."

=== The Exodus and the conquest of Canaan ===
This period is conjectured to start sometime after 1800 BC and end sometime before 1000 BC. In this period (in which can be included the promise made to Abraham, centuries earlier, and its recall by Nehemiah half a millennium later), the Hittites are mentioned about a dozen times as part of an almost fixed formula that lists the "seven nations greater and mightier than [the Hebrews]" whose lands will be eventually conquered. Five other "major nations" are mentioned in almost all instances of the formula: Canaanites, Amorites, Hivites, Jebusites, and Perizzites. The Girgashites are mentioned only five times. Abraham's covenant in Genesis 15:18 omits the Hivites but includes the Kadmonites, Kenites, Kenizzites, and Rephaim.

Among the five references to the Hittites that cannot be classified as a variant of that formula, two (Numbers 13:29 and Joshua 11:3) declare that the Hittites "dwell in the mountains", together with the Jebusites, Amorites, and Perizzites, whereas the Canaanites live "on the east and on the west", on the coast of Jordan, and the Amalekites live "in the south". In Joshua 1:4 the land of the Hittites is said to extend "from the wilderness and this Lebanon", from "the Euphrates unto the great sea". In Judges 1:18, the traitor from Bethel who led the Hebrews into the city is said to have gone to live among the Hittites where he built a city called Luz. Finally in Judges 3:5 it is said that the Hebrews lived and intermarried with the Hittites as well as with the other five "major nations".

==== Abraham's covenant ====
- Genesis 15:18 "In the same day the LORD made a covenant with Abram, saying, Unto thy seed have I given this land, from the river of Egypt unto the great river, the river Euphrates: 19 The Kenites, and the Kenizzites, and the Kadmonites, 20 And the Hittites, and the Perizzites, and the Rephaims, 21 And the Amorites, and the Canaanites, and the Girgashites, and the Jebusites."
- Nehemiah 9:8 And foundest his heart faithful before Thee, and madest a covenant with him to give the land of the Canaanites, the Hittites, the Amorites, and the Perizzites, and the Jebusites, and the Girgashites, to give it, I say, to his seed, and hast performed Thy words; for Thou art righteous: [...]"

==== Moses ====
- Deuteronomy 20:17 "But thou shalt utterly destroy them; namely, the Hittites, and the Amorites, the Canaanites, and the Perizzites, the Hivites, and the Jebusite; as the LORD thy God hath commanded thee: [...]"
- Deuteronomy 7:1 "When the LORD thy God shall bring thee into the land whither thou goest to possess it, and hath cast out many nations before thee, the Hittites, and the Girgashites, and the Amorites, and the Canaanites, and the Perizzites, and the Hivites, and the Jebusites, seven nations greater and mightier than thou; [...]"
- Numbers 13:29 "The Amalekites dwell in the land of the south: and the Hittites, and the Jebusites, and the Amorites, dwell in the mountains: and the Canaanites dwell by the sea, and by the coast of Jordan."

==== Joshua ====
- Exodus 3:8 "And I am come down to deliver them out of the hand of the Egyptians, and to bring them up out of that land unto a good land and a large, unto a land flowing with milk and honey; unto the place of the Canaanites, and the Hittites, and the Amorites, and the Perizzites, and the Hivites, and the Jebusites. [...] 17 And I have said, I will bring you up out of the affliction of Egypt unto the land of the Canaanites, and the Hittites, and the Amorites, and the Perizzites, and the Hivites, and the Jebusites, unto a land flowing with milk and honey."
- Exodus 13:5 "And it shall be when the LORD shall bring thee into the land of the Canaanites, and the Hittites, and the Amorites, and the Hivites, and the Jebusites, which He swore unto thy fathers to give thee, a land flowing with milk and honey, that thou shalt keep this service in this month."
- Exodus 23:23 "For Mine Angel shall go before thee, and bring thee in unto the Amorites, and the Hittites, and the Perizzites, and the Canaanites, and the Hivites, and the Jebusites: and I will cut them off. [...] 28 And I will send hornets before thee, which shall drive out the Hivite, the Canaanite, and the Hittite, from before thee."
- Exodus 33:2 "And I will send an angel before thee; and I will drive out the Canaanite, the Amorite, and the Hittite, and the Perizzite, the Hivite, and the Jebusite: [...]
- Exodus 34:11 "Observe thou that which I command thee this day: behold, I drive out before thee the Amorite, and the Canaanite, and the Hittite, and the Perizzite, and the Hivite, and the Jebusite."
- Joshua 1:4 "From the wilderness and this Lebanon even unto the great river, the river Euphrates, all the land of the Hittites, and unto the great sea toward the going down of the sun, shall be your coast."
- Joshua 11:3 "And to the Canaanite on the east and on the west, and to the Amorite, and the Hittite, and the Perizzite, and the Jebusite in the mountains, and to the Hivite under Hermon in the land of Mizpeh."
- Joshua 12:8 "In the mountains, and in the valleys, and in the plains, and in the springs, and in the wilderness, and in the south country; the Hittites, the Amorites, and the Canaanites, the Perizzites, the Hivites, and the Jebusites: [...]
- Joshua 24:11 "And ye went over Jordan, and came unto Jericho: and the men of Jericho fought against you, the Amorites, and the Perizzites, and the Canaanites, and the Hittites, and the Girgashites, the Hivites, and the Jebusites; and I delivered them into your hand."
- Joshua 3:10 "And Joshua said, Hereby ye shall know that the living God is among you, and that He will without fail drive out from before you the Canaanites, and the Hittites, and the Hivites, and the Perizzites, and the Girgashites, and the Amorites, and the Jebusites."
- Joshua 9:1 "And it came to pass, when all the kings which were on this side Jordan, in the hills, and in the valleys, and in all the coasts of the great sea over against Lebanon, the Hittite, and the Amorite, the Canaanite, the Perizzite, the Hivite, and the Jebusite, heard thereof."

==== Judges ====
- Judges 1:18 "Also Judah took Gaza with the coast thereof, and Askelon with the coast thereof, and Ekron with the coast thereof. 19 And the LORD was with Judah; and he drave out the inhabitants of the mountain; but could not drive out the inhabitants of the valley, because they had chariots of iron. [...] 21 And the children of Benjamin did not drive out the Jebusites that inhabited Jerusalem; but the Jebusites dwell with the children of Benjamin in Jerusalem unto this day. 22 And the house of Joseph, they also went up against Bethel: and the LORD was with them. 23 And the house of Joseph sent to descry Bethel. (Now the name of the city before was Luz.) 24 And the spies saw a man come forth out of the city, and they said unto him, Shew us, we pray thee, the entrance into the city, and we will shew thee mercy. 25 And when he shewed them the entrance into the city, they smote the city with the edge of the sword; but they let go the man and all his family. 26 And the man went into the land of the Hittites, and built a city, and called the name thereof Luz: which is the name thereof unto this day. 27 Neither did Manasseh drive out the inhabitants of Beth-shean and her towns, nor Taanach and her towns, nor the inhabitants of Dor and her towns, nor the inhabitants of Ibleam and her towns, nor the inhabitants of Megiddo and her towns: but the Canaanites would dwell in that land."
- Judges 3:1 "Now these are the nations which the LORD left, to prove Israel by them, even as many of Israel as had not known all the wars of Canaan; 2 Only that the generations of the children of Israel might know, to teach them war, at the least such as before knew nothing thereof; 3 Namely, five lords of the Philistines, and all the Canaanites, and the Sidonians, and the Hivites that dwelt in mount Lebanon, from mount Baal-hermon unto the entering in of Hamath. 4 And they were to prove Israel by them, to know whether they would hearken unto the commandments of the LORD, which he commanded their fathers by the hand of Moses. 5 And the children of Israel dwelt among the Canaanites, Hittites, and Amorites, and Perizzites, and Hivites, and Jebusites: 6 And they took their daughters to be their wives, and gave their daughters to their sons, and served their gods. 7 And the children of Israel did evil in the sight of the LORD, and forgat the LORD their God, and served Baalim and the groves. 8 Therefore the anger of the LORD was hot against Israel, and he sold them into the hand of Chushan-rishathaim king of Mesopotamia: and the children of Israel served Chushan-rishathaim eight years."

=== Kingdoms period ===
In this period the Hittites are mentioned as the ethnic label of two soldiers under king David (around 1000 BC), Ahimelech and Uriah; the latter is murdered by David for the sake of his wife Bathsheba.

In Solomon's reign (around 950 BC), the Hittites are listed as people whom the Hebrews had not been able "utterly to destroy" in their conquest of Canaan and who paid tribute to Israel. The kings of the Hittites are mentioned (in two similar passages), together with Egypt and the kings of Syria, as senders of lavish tribute to Solomon. Then Hittites are said to be among the "strange women" that Solomon loved, along with "the daughter of the pharaoh" and women from the other peoples in the region.

In the time of the prophet Elisha (around 850 BC) there is a passage in 2 Kings 7:6 where the Syrians flee in the night after hearing a terrible noise of horses and chariots, believing that Israel had hired "the kings of the Hittites, and the kings of the Egyptians".

==== Saul ====
- 1 Samuel 26:5 "And David arose, and came to the place where Saul had pitched: and David beheld the place where Saul lay, and Abner the son of Ner, the captain of his host: and Saul lay in the trench, and the people pitched round about him. 6 Then answered David and said to Ahimelech the Hittite, and to Abishai the son of Zeruiah, brother to Joab, saying, Who will go down with me to Saul to the camp? And Abishai said, I will go down with thee."

==== David ====
- 2 Samuel 23:8 "These be the names of the mighty men whom David had: [...] 39 Uriah the Hittite: thirty and seven in all."
- 1 Chronicles 11:10 "These also are the chief of the mighty men whom David had, who strengthened themselves with him in his kingdom, and with all Israel, to make him king, according to the word of the LORD concerning Israel. [...] 41 Uriah the Hittite, Zabad the son of Ahlai, [...]
- 2 Samuel 11:3 "And David sent and inquired after the woman. And one said, Is not this Bath-sheba, the daughter of Eliam, the wife of Uriah the Hittite? 4 And David sent messengers, and took her; and she came in unto him, and he lay with her; for she was purified from her uncleanness: and she returned unto her house." Uriah the Hittite is named four more times in this chapter.
- 2 Samuel 12:9 "[Nathan:] Wherefore hast thou despised the commandment of the LORD, to do evil in his sight? thou hast killed Uriah the Hittite with the sword, and hast taken his wife to be thy wife, and hast slain him with the sword of the children of Ammon. 10 Now therefore the sword shall never depart from thine house; because thou hast despised me, and hast taken the wife of Uriah the Hittite to be thy wife."
- 1 Kings 15:5 "Because David did that which was right in the eyes of the LORD, and turned not aside from any thing that He commanded him all the days of his life, save only in the matter of Uriah the Hittite."

==== Solomon ====
- 1 Kings 9:20 "And all the people that were left of the Amorites, Hittites, Perizzites, Hivites, and Jebusites, which were not of the children of Israel, 21 Their children that were left after them in the land, whom the children of Israel also were not able utterly to destroy, upon those did Solomon levy a tribute of bondservice unto this day."
- 2 Chronicles 8:7 "As for all the people that were left of the Hittites, and the Amorites, and the Perizzites, and the Hivites, and the Jebusites, which were not of Israel, [...]"
- 1 Kings 10:28 "And Solomon had horses brought out of Egypt, and linen yarn: the king's merchants received the linen yarn at a price. 29 And a chariot came up and went out of Egypt for six hundred shekels of silver, and a horse for a hundred and fifty: and so for all the kings of the Hittites, and for the kings of Syria, did they bring them out by their means."
- 2 Chronicles 1:16 "And Solomon had horses brought out of Egypt, and linen yarn: the king's merchants received the linen yarn at a price. 17 And they fetched up, and brought forth out of Egypt a chariot for six hundred shekels of silver, and a horse for a hundred and fifty: and so brought they out horses for all the kings of the Hittites, and for the kings of Syria, by their means."
- 1 Kings 11:1 "But king Solomon loved many strange women, together with the daughter of Pharaoh, women of the Moabites, Ammonites, Edomites, Zidonians, and Hittites; 2 Of the nations concerning which the LORD said unto the children of Israel, Ye shall not go in to them, neither shall they come in unto you: for surely they will turn away your heart after their gods: Solomon clave unto these in love. 3 And he had seven hundred wives, princesses, and three hundred concubines: and his wives turned away his heart. 4 For it came to pass, when Solomon was old, that his wives turned away his heart after other gods: and his heart was not perfect with the LORD his God, as was the heart of David his father. 5 For Solomon went after Ashtoreth the goddess of the Zidonians, and after Milcom the abomination of the Ammonites. 6 And Solomon did evil in the sight of the LORD, and went not fully after the LORD, as did David his father. 7 Then did Solomon build a high place for Chemosh, the abomination of Moab, in the hill that is before Jerusalem, and for Molech, the abomination of the children of Ammon. 8 And likewise did he for all his strange wives, which burnt incense and sacrificed unto their gods."

==== Elisha ====
- 2 Kings 7:6 "For the Lord had made the host of the Syrians to hear a noise of chariots, and a noise of horses, even the noise of a great host: and they said one to another, Lo, the king of Israel hath hired against us the kings of the Hittites, and the kings of the Egyptians, to come upon us. 7 Wherefore they arose and fled in the twilight, and left their tents, and their horses, and their asses, even the camp as it was, and fled for their life."

=== Babylonian exile and return ===
In Ezekiel 16:1, Jerusalem is said to be the daughter of a Hittite mother and an Amorite father, sister of Samaria and Sodom. The intent is clearly offensive, but it is not clear whether the reference to the Hittites is concrete or only symbolic. However, a century later, Ezra is dismayed to learn, on his arrival from Babylon, that the leaders who had remained on the land had been "polluted" by mixing with other people, including the Hittites.

==== Ezekiel ====
- Ezekiel 16:1 "Again the word of the LORD came unto me, saying, 2 Son of man, cause Jerusalem to know her abominations, 3 And say, Thus saith the Lord GOD unto Jerusalem; Thy birth and thy nativity is of the land of Canaan; thy father was an Amorite, and thy mother an Hittite. [...] 44 Behold, every one that useth proverbs shall use this proverb against thee, saying, As is the mother, so is her daughter. 45 Thou art thy mother's daughter, that lotheth her husband and her children; and thou art the sister of thy sisters, which lothed their husbands and their children: your mother was an Hittite, and your father an Amorite. 46 And thine elder sister is Samaria, she and her daughters that dwell at thy left hand: and thy younger sister, that dwelleth at thy right hand, is Sodom and her daughters."

==== Ezra ====
- 1 Esdras 8:3 (disputed canonicity) "This Esdras went up from Babylon, as a scribe, being very ready in the law of Moses, that was given by the God of Israel. 4 And the king [Artaxerxes] did him honour: for he found grace in his sight in all his requests. 5 There went up with him also certain of the children of Israel, of the priest of the Levites, of the holy singers, porters, and ministers of the temple, unto Jerusalem, [...] 68 Now when these things were done, the rulers came unto me, and said, 69 The nation of Israel, the princes, the priests and Levites, have not put away from them the strange people of the land, nor the pollutions of the Gentiles to wit, of the Canaanites, Hittites, Pheresites, Jebusites, and the Moabites, Egyptians, and Edomites."
- Ezra 9:1 "Now when these things were done, the princes came to me, saying, The people of Israel, and the priests, and the Levites, have not separated themselves from the people of the lands, doing according to their abominations, even of the Canaanites, the Hittites, the Perizzites, the Jebusites, the Ammonites, the Moabites, the Egyptians, and the Amorites."

== See also ==
- Hattians
- Habiru
- Hittites
- Neo-Hittites
- Uriah the Hittite

== Books ==
- D. J. Wiseman, Peoples of the Old Testament Times, Clarendon Press, Oxford (1973)
