= Covenant of the pieces =

Old Testament event

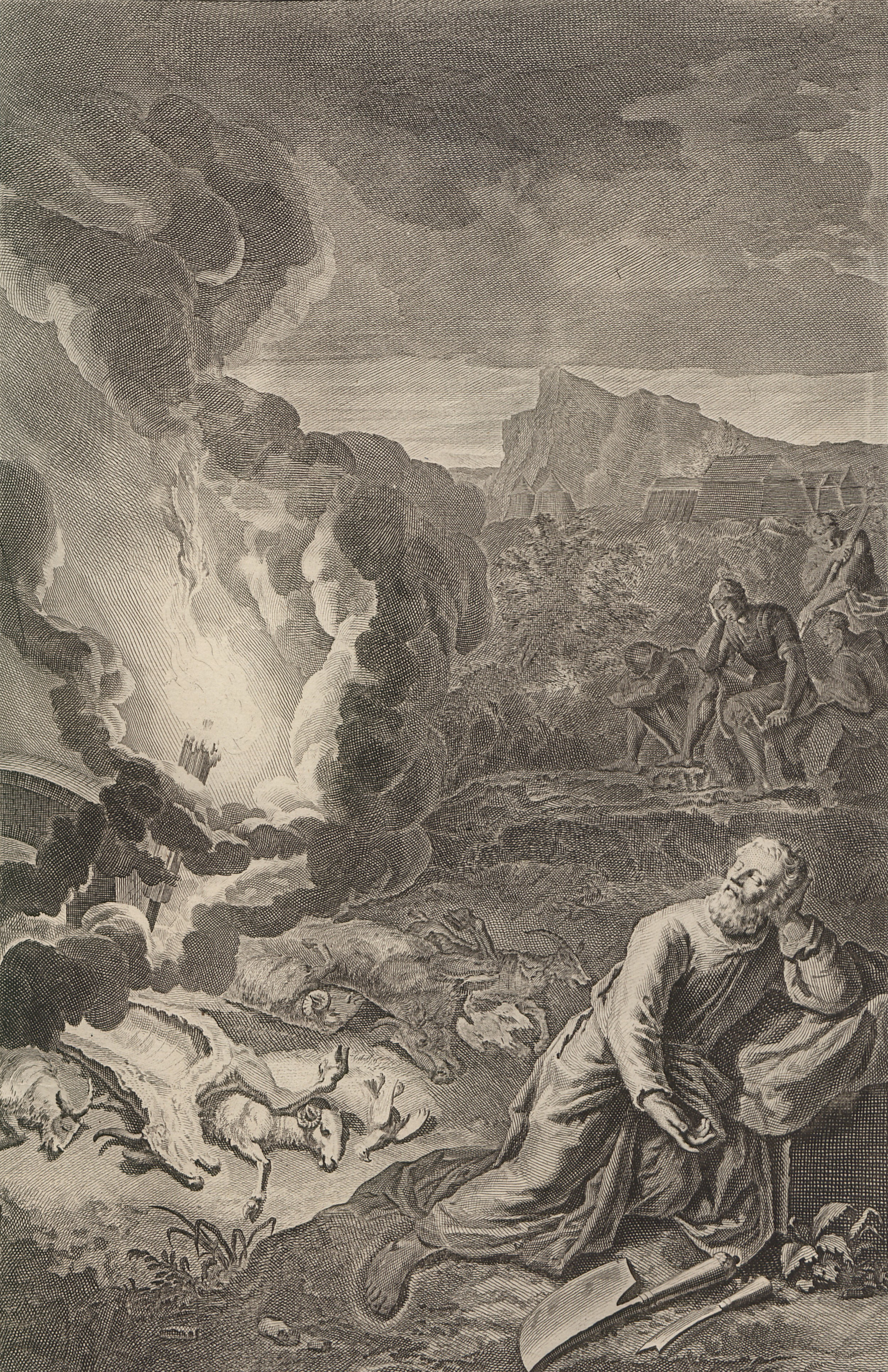
Illustration of the events from Figures de la Bible (1728), by Gerard Hoet and others

The Hebrew Bible records the covenant of the pieces or covenant between the parts (Hebrew: ברית בין הבתרים, romanized: Brit Bein HaBetarim), also called the "biblical land covenant", which is seen as an important event in Jewish history. In this central narrative God revealed himself to Abram (later Abraham) and made a covenant with him, in which God announced to Abraham that his descendants would eventually inherit the Land of Israel. According to Jewish tradition, the location was at Mount Betarim, in the Anti-Lebanon Mountains.

This was the first of a series of covenants made between God and the Patriarchs. (Note: See Covenant (biblical)#Abrahamic.)

== Biblical narrative ==
According to the biblical narrative in Genesis 15:1–20, God made a covenant with Abram. The narrative begins with a vision in which God introduced himself to Abram and promised him "a great reward". Abram expressed his concerns about being childless, thinking that his estate would be inherited by Eliezer of Damascus, a servant of his. God then reminded him of his original promise to make him a father of a "great nation" and then revealed that he would have a son born to him.

Later that day, at the drawing of the evening, Abram fell into a deep sleep where he encountered God again. God then prophesied to Abram that the nation born to him would be removed to another land where they must endure tribulation for four hundred years; after this, they would be greatly blessed with many possessions and occupy their own land. This prophecy was that of the Israelites in subjection to Egypt, for four hundred years, before returning back to Canaan to claim it as their own.

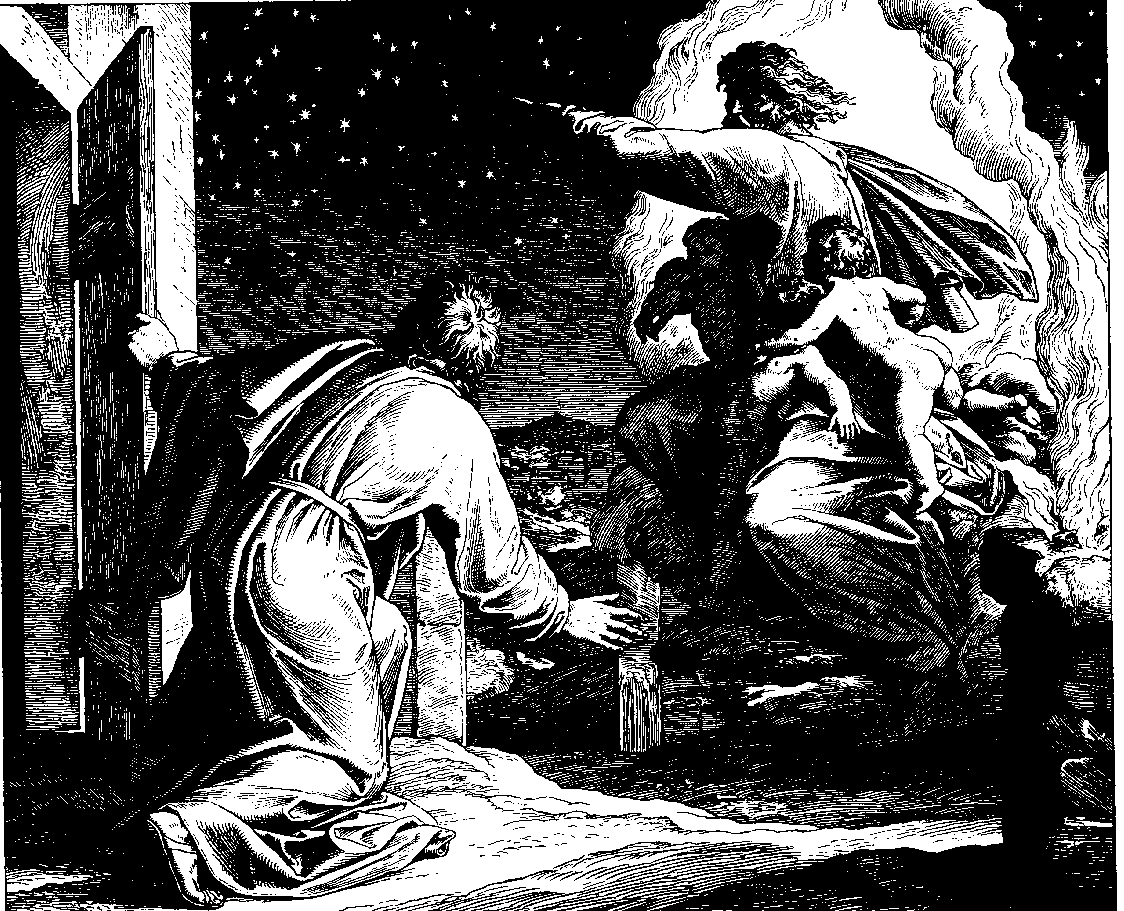
The Vision of the Lord Directing Abram to Count the Stars (woodcut by Julius Schnorr von Carolsfeld from the 1860 Bible in Pictures)

It was on this occasion that Abram entered into a covenant with God, who promised him the land which his offspring would inherit:

"To your descendants I give this land, from the river of Egypt to the great river, the Euphrates, the land of the Kenites, Kenizzites, Kadmonites, Hittites, Perizzites, Rephaites, Amorites, Canaanites, Girgashites and Jebusites."

—Genesis 15:18–21

Genesis 15:18 affirms that "the LORD made a covenant with Abram".

Brian Wilbur observes that Abram had first prepared the sacrifice, in obedience to instructions set out in verse 9, but "when it came time to actually ratify the covenant, Abram was asleep ... and the LORD alone passed between the broken pieces of the sacrificed animals", although Robert Payne Smith, in contrast, suggests that "Abram had probably passed between them immediately after arranging them" before the LORD did the same.

A similar covenant is mentioned in Jeremiah 34:18–22: And the men who transgressed my covenant and did not keep the terms of the covenant that they made before me, I will make them like the calf that they cut in two and passed between its parts.

== Modern scholarship ==
Covenants in biblical times were often sealed by severing an animal, with the implication that the party who breaks the covenant will suffer a similar fate. In Hebrew, the verb meaning 'to seal a covenant' translates literally as "to cut".

== Evolution of covenant ==
In the biblical context, "to seal a covenant" signified a solemn and binding agreement between God and humanity. It represented a divine promise that was accompanied by specific rituals and obligations. For instance, the covenant between God and Abraham, as recounted in Genesis 15, involved animal sacrifices and a symbolic passage between the split pieces of the animals, symbolizing the irrevocable nature of the pact.

Over time, the concept of sealing a covenant extended beyond its biblical origins to encompass various cultural and social contexts. In ancient civilizations, covenants were often invoked to solidify alliances, establish peace treaties, and regulate trade agreements. The act of sealing a covenant often involved physical gestures, such as the exchange of objects or the performance of rituals, to reinforce the commitment and strengthen the bond between the parties involved.

In modern times, the term "to seal a covenant" has retained its symbolic significance, particularly in Jewish and Christian traditions. For Jews, the covenant represents the enduring relationship between God and the Jewish people, symbolized by the Torah and the observance of its laws. The concept of sealing a covenant underscores the reciprocal obligations of both parties – God's promise of protection and blessings in exchange for the Jewish people's adherence to divine commandments.

In Christianity, the notion of sealing a covenant finds expression in the New Testament, particularly in the writings of Paul the Apostle. Paul uses the imagery of a sealed document to represent the believer's salvation through faith in Jesus Christ. The Holy Spirit is considered the "seal of approval" on the believer's heart, guaranteeing their inheritance in the kingdom of God.

The modern understanding of sealing a covenant emphasizes its spiritual and personal dimensions. It represents a commitment to a set of values, principles, and beliefs that shape one's identity and guide one's actions. The act of sealing a covenant is often associated with significant life events, such as marriage, religious conversion, or personal commitments to self-improvement.

== See also ==
- Binding of Isaac
