= Asiatic race =

The term "Asiatic Race" may refer to:

- synonym of Asian race
  - Asian people
  - Mongoloid race
- Hamitic hypothesis (i.e. the "Asiatic" origin of North African peoples)
- Asiatic race theory holds that the ancient Egyptians were the lineal descendants of the biblical Ham, through his son Mizraim.
