= Ham (Genesis) =

Biblical figure, son of Noah

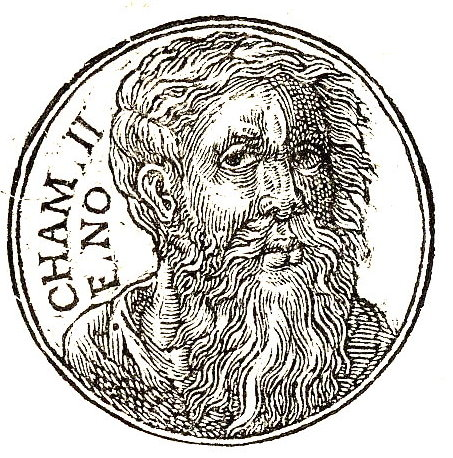
- 16th-century depiction by Guillaume Rouillé
- Children: Cush; Mizraim; Phut; Canaan
- Parent: Noah
- Relatives: Shem and Japheth (brothers)

Geographic identifications for the Sons of Noah (Flavius Josephus, c. 100 AD); Ham's sons are in blue.

Ham (Note: Hebrew: חָם, Modern: H̱am, Tiberian: Ḥām; Greek Χαμ Kham, Ge'ez: ካም Kam; Arabic: حام, Ḥām) (in Hebrew: חָם), according to the Table of Nations in the Book of Genesis, was either the second or the youngest son of Noah, and the father of Cush, Mizraim, Phut and Canaan.

Ham's descendants are interpreted by Josephus and others as having populated Africa. The Bible refers to Egypt as "the land of Ham" in Psalms 78:51; 105:23, 27; 106:22; and 1 Chronicles 4:40.

== Etymology ==
Since the 17th century, a number of suggestions have been made that relate the name Ham to a Hebrew word for "burnt", "black" or "hot", to the Egyptian word ḥm for "servant" or the word ḥm for "majesty" or the Egyptian word kmt for "Egypt". A 2004 review of David Goldenberg's The Curse of Ham: Race and Slavery in Early Judaism, Christianity and Islam (2003) states that Goldenberg "argues persuasively that the biblical name Ham bears no relationship at all to the notion of blackness and as of now is of unknown etymology."

== In the Bible ==
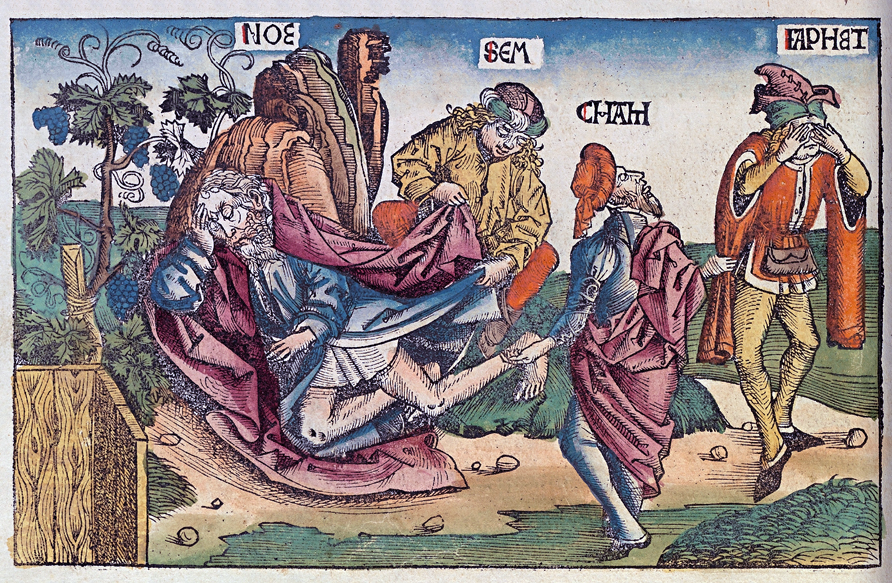
This illustration from the 16th-century Nuremberg Chronicle uses the spelling "Cham".

Genesis 5:32 indicates that Noah became the father of Shem, Ham and Japheth at the age of 500 years old, but does not list in detail their specific years. (Note: Noah was 600 years old at the time of the flood in Genesis 7.) Genesis 10:1 asserts that children were born to the sons of Noah after the flood.

An incident involving Ham is related in Genesis 9:20–27, which refers to Ham as Noah's "youngest son":

And Noah began to be an husbandman, and planted a vineyard: and he drank of the wine, and was drunken; and he was uncovered within his tent. And Ham, the father of Canaan, saw the nakedness of his father, and told his two brethren without. And Shem and Japheth took a garment, and laid it upon both their shoulders, and went backward, and covered the nakedness of their father; and their faces were backward, and they saw not their father's nakedness.

And Noah awoke from his wine, and knew what his youngest son had done unto him. And he said,

Cursed be Canaan;
A servant of servants shall he be unto his brethren.

And he said,

Blessed be the LORD, the God of Shem;
And let Canaan be his servant.
God enlarge Japheth,
And let him dwell in the tents of Shem;
And let Canaan be his servant. — Revised Version

== Curse of Canaan ==
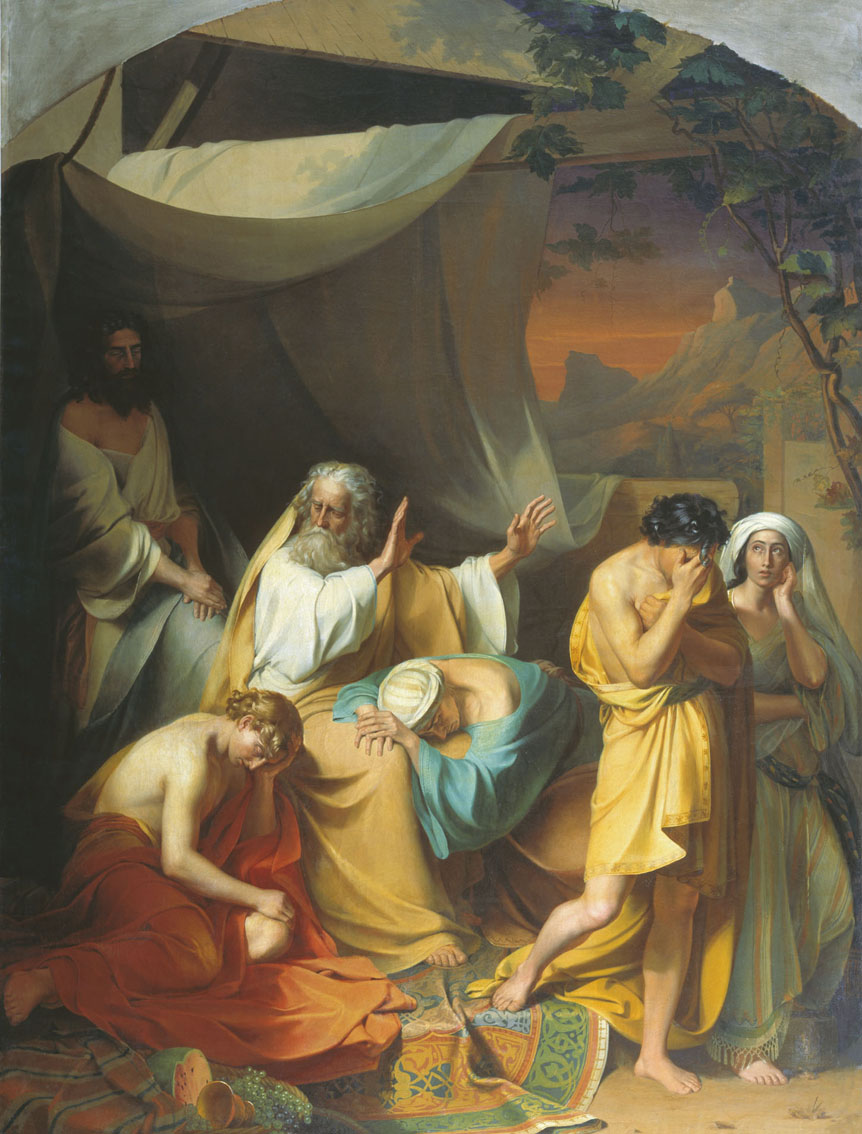
Ivan Ksenofontov. The damnation of Ham, 19th century

What is commonly known as "The Curse of Ham" was not bestowed upon Ham himself; rather, Noah indirectly cursed him through his son Canaan.

The Talmud presents two possible explanations, one attributed to Rabbi Abba Arikha and one to Rabbi Samuel, for what Ham did to Noah to warrant the curse.

According to Abba Arika, Ham castrated Noah on the basis that, since Noah cursed Ham by his fourth son Canaan, Ham must have injured Noah with respect to a fourth son. Emasculating him thus deprived Noah of the possibility of a fourth son.

According to Samuel, Ham sodomized Noah, a judgment that he based on analogy with another biblical incident in which the phrase "and he saw" is used. In Genesis 34:2 it reads, "And when Shechem the son of Hamor saw her (Dinah), he took her and lay with her and defiled her." With regard to Ham and Noah, Genesis 9 reads, "[22] And Ham, the father of Canaan, saw the nakedness of his father, and told his two brethren without. [23] And Shem and Japheth took a garment, and laid it upon both their shoulders, and went backward, and covered the nakedness of their father; and their faces were backward, and they saw not their father's nakedness." According to this argument, similar abuse must have happened each time that the Bible uses the same language. On castration and sodomy, one Talmudic sage concludes that, "both this offense and that offense were committed."

Although the story can be taken literally, in more recent times, some scholars have suggested that Ham may have had intercourse with his father's wife. Under this interpretation, Canaan is cursed as the "product of Ham's illicit union".

=== Jubilees ===
The chronological scheme of the pseudepigraphal Book of Jubilees has Ham born in the year 1209 Anno Mundi (A.M.) – two years after Shem, three before Japheth, and 99 before the flood. It gives the name of his wife who also survived the flood as Na'eltama'uk. After his youngest son Canaan was cursed in 1321 A.M., he left Mount Ararat and built a city named for his wife on the south side of the mountain. In 1569 A.M., he received a third division of the earth along with his two brothers for his inheritance: everything west of the Nile River, and to the south of Gadir. In 1639 A.M. when the nations were scattered following the failure of the Tower of Babel, Ham and his children journeyed to their allotment, with the exception of Canaan, who settled in Shem's territory, thus receiving another curse.

According to Jubilees 10:29–34, this second curse is attributed to Canaan's steadfast refusal to join his elder brothers in Ham's allotment beyond the Nile, and instead "squatting" within the inheritance of Shem, on the eastern shores of the Mediterranean, the region later promised to Abraham:

And Canaan saw the land of Lebanon to the river of Egypt, that it was very good, and he went not into the land of his inheritance to the west (that is to) the sea, and he dwelt in the land of Lebanon, eastward and westward from the border of Jordan and from the border of the sea. And Ham, his father, and Cush and Mizraim his brothers said unto him: 'Thou hast settled in a land which is not thine, and which did not fall to us by lot: do not do so; for if thou dost do so, thou and thy sons will fall in the land and (be) accursed through sedition; for by sedition ye have settled, and by sedition will thy children fall, and thou shalt be rooted out for ever. Dwell not in the dwelling of Shem; for to Shem and to his sons did it come by their lot. Cursed art thou, and cursed shalt thou be beyond all the sons of Noah, by the curse by which we bound ourselves by an oath in the presence of the holy judge, and in the presence of Noah our father.' But he did not hearken unto them, and dwelt in the land of Lebanon from Hamath to the entering of Egypt, he and his sons until this day. And for this reason that land is named Canaan. – Jubilees 10:29–34.

The usurpation theory is similarly believed by Albert Barnes. According to Barnes' exegesis of Genesis 10:18, the Canaanite clans scattered after the Tower of Babel incident and settled in the southern Levant, where they named the region after themselves. It is unknown whether they were dispersed violently or not. However, Canaan's cousin, Nimrod, had a "grasping tendency", making Barnes believe that Canaan had similar qualities. Thus, Canaan's settlement of the southern Levant was interpreted as a violent conquest, with Canaan "seizing upon the country with a high hand".

== Supposed tomb ==
A tomb in Gharibwal, Pakistan, has been claimed by local residents to be the site of Ham's burial since 1891, when Hafiz Sham-us-Din of Gulyana, Gujrat, claimed Ham had revealed this to him in a dream. A plaque on the tomb since erected over the 78-foot-long (24 m) gravesite states that Ham, locally revered as a prophet, was buried there after having lived 536 years.

== Family tree ==
Ham
Cush	Mizraim	Put	Canaan
Seba	Havilah	Sabtah	Raamah	Sabtechah	Nimrod
Sheba	Dedan
Ludim	Anamim	Lehabim	Naphtuhim	Pathrusim	Casluhim	Caphtorim
Sidon	Heth	Jebusites	Amorites	Girgashites	Hivites	Arkites	Sinites	Arvadites	Zemarites	Hamathites

== See also ==
- Noach (parsha)
- Sons of Noah
- Hamites
