= Heth (Bible) =

Christian religious figure

Heth is, according to Genesis 10:15, the second son of Canaan, who is son of Ham, son of Noah. Heth is the ancestor of the Biblical Hethites, second of the twelve Canaanite nations descended from his sons, who lived near Hebron (Genesis 23:3,7).

In Genesis 10:15-16, Heth is placed between Sidon and the Jebusites, Amorites, Girgasites, Hivites, Arkite, Sinite, Arvadite, Zemarite, Hamathite and other peoples, showing their descent through their children, called "Children of Heth" (Genesis 23:3, 5, 7, 10, 16, 18, 20).

Heth means Terror.
