= Mount Betarim =

Peak of Mount Dov, Golan Heights

- مشهد الطير الإبراهيمي הר הבתרים
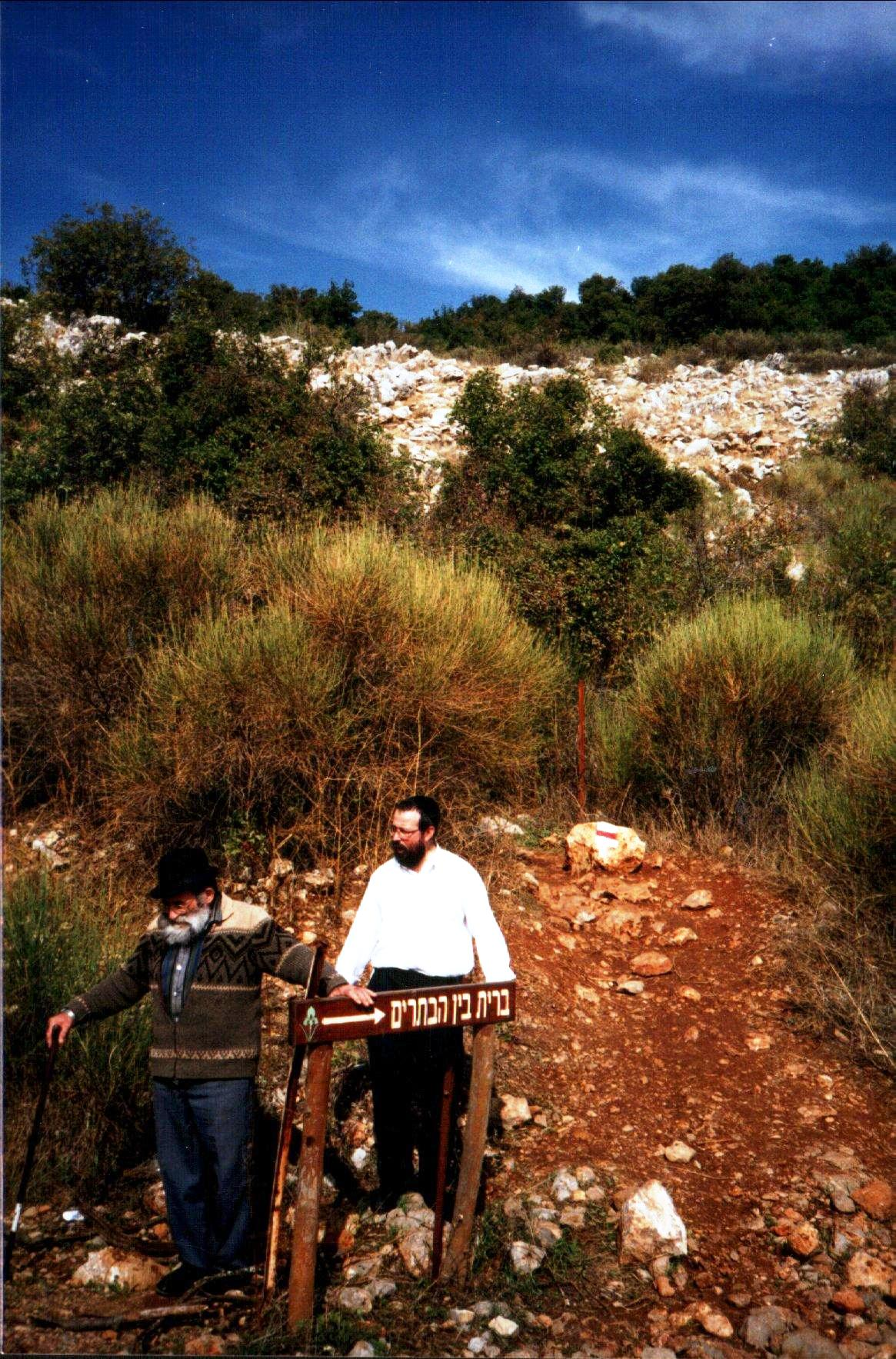

Highest point
- Elevation: 1,296 m (4,252 ft)
- Coordinates: 33.2922°N 35.7086°E

Geography
- Location within Lebanon Location within Syria
- Location: Mount Hermon
- Parent range: Anti-Lebanon Mountains

Mount Betarim (Hebrew: הר הבתרים, Har haBetarim) is one of the peaks of Shebaa Farms (known also as "Jabal Ross"), in the Anti-Lebanon Mountains.

According to one Jewish tradition this is the site of the covenant of the pieces between Abraham and God, recounted in Genesis 15.

According to Muslim tradition, this is the site in which an event occurred, which is described in the Quran, where God commanded Abraham to sacrifice four species of birds, and afterwards resurrected them. Therefore, it was called Mashhad A-Tir al-Ibrahim (Arabic: مشهد الطير الإبراهيمي), meaning "the sacred site of Abraham's birds" or Makam Ibrahim Al-Khalil (مقام إبراهيم الخليل) meaning "the sacred site of Abraham, God's friend".

== Archaeology ==
The site contains remains of an ancient settlement, which includes the agricultural steps and pottery from the Hellenistic period and from the Byzantine period. The site also includes two water reservoirs and five grave structures.
