= Asian race =

The term Asian race (in reference to humans) may refer to:

- Asian people
- Mongoloid race
- Central Asian peoples: Turkic peoples, Iranian peoples.
- East Asian peoples: List of Chinese ethnic groups, Sino-Tibetan peoples, Japanese people, Koreans, Mongols
- South Asian peoples: Ethnic groups of India, Ethnic groups in Pakistan, Dravidians, Indo-Aryans, Munda people.
- West Asian peoples (sometimes): Saudis, Iraqis, Kuwaitis, Lebanese, Israelis, Palestinians, Armenians, Georgians, Azerbaijanis, Anatolians, Cypriots, Emiratis, Omanis, Syrians, Jordanians, Yemenis, Qataris, Bahrainis, Egyptians

== See also ==
- Asiatic race (disambiguation)
- Asian American
  - Race and ethnicity in the United States Census
- Asian Canadian
- Asian Australian
