= Tiras =

Biblical figure

Tiras (Hebrew: תִירָס Ṯīrās) is, according to the Book of Genesis (Genesis 10) and 1 Chronicles, the seventh and youngest son of Japheth in the Hebrew Bible. A brother of biblical Javan (associated with the Greek people), its geographical locale is sometimes associated by scholars with the Teresh or Tursha, one of the groups which made up the Sea Peoples, a naval confederacy which terrorized Egypt and other Mediterranean nations around 1200 BCE. These Sea People are referred to as "Tursha" in an inscription of Ramesses III, and as "Teresh of the Sea" on the Merneptah Stele. The equation of the Teresh/Tursha with the Tyrrhenians, and by extension with the Etruscans, is not accepted by modern scholarship; there is no archaeological or linguistic evidence of any migration of a Tyrrhenians people into central Italy from the Aegean or Anatolia, and genetic studies of Iron Age individuals from Etruria have found no evidence of recent population movement from Anatolia, confirming a local autochthonous origin for the Etruscans. French scholar Dominique Briquel noted that, even if these stories include historical facts suggesting contact, such contact is more plausibly traceable to cultural exchange than to migration.

Some theologians associate Tiras with Thrace or the Etruscans. In 1838, the German theologian Johann Christian Friedrich Tuch suggested identifying Tiras with the Etruscans, who, according to Greek and Roman sources such as Herodotus (I, 94), had been living in Lydia as the Tyrsenoi before emigrating to Italy as early as the 8th century BC. This identification is a 19th-century theological speculation unsupported by modern evidence. Herodotus' account of the Etruscans as Lydian migrants has been shown to be a politically motivated legend, likely fabricated at the Lydian court in the early sixth century BC and lacking any claim to historical truth. Archaeogenomic research has confirmed that the Etruscans were autochthonous and genetically similar to their Latin neighbours, with no detectable Anatolian admixture dateable to the Bronze or early Iron Age.

== Ancient and medieval identifications ==
According to the Book of Jubilees, the inheritance of Tiras consisted of four large islands in the ocean.

Josephus wrote that Tiras became ancestor of the "Thirasians" (Thracians), a "flame-haired" (red or blond haired) people according to Xenophanes (Antiquities of the Jews, I, 6).

Movses Khorenatsi, 5th century Armenian historian, attributed the founder of Armenian nation, Hayk, to being a grandson of Tiras.

According to tractate Yoma, in the Talmud, Tiras is the ancestor of Persia.

The Persian historian Muhammad ibn Jarir al-Tabari (c. 915) recounts a tradition that Tiras had a son named Batawil, whose daughters Qarnabil, Bakht, and Arsal became the wives of Cush, Put, and Canaan, respectively.

The mediaeval Hebrew compilation, the Chronicles of Jerahmeel 27:2, aside from quoting Yosippon as above, also provides a separate tradition of Tiras' sons elsewhere, naming them as Maakh, Tabel, Bal'anah, Shampla, Meah, and Elash. This material was ultimately derived from Pseudo-Philo 4:16 (ca. 75 AD), extant copies of which list Tiras' sons as Maac, Tabel, Ballana, Samplameac, and Elaz.

Another medieval rabbinic text Book of Jasher (7:9) records the sons of Tiras as Benib, Gera, Lupirion, and Gilak, and in 10:14, it asserts that Rushash, Cushni, and Ongolis are among his descendants. An earlier (950 AD) rabbinic compilation, the Yosippon, similarly claims Tiras' descendants to be the Rossi of Kiv, i.e. Kievan Rus, listing them together with his brother Meshech's supposed descendants as "the Rossi; the Saqsni and the Iglesusi".

== Modern interpretations ==
English theologian John Gill (1697-1771) claimed Tiras was more aptly described as the founder of Thrace than Persia, stating that "[Tiras is interpreted] better the Targums of Jonathan and Jerusalem, and so a Jewish chronologer, by Thracia; for the descendants of Thiras, as Josephus observes, the Greeks call Thracians; and in Thrace was a river called Athyras, which has in it a trace of this man's name; and Odrysus, whom the Thracians worshipped, is the same with Tiras, which god sometimes goes by the name of Thrax; and is one of the names of Mars, the god of the Thracians.".

According to some biblical commentators, the descendants of Tiras have been identified with the Tyrsenoi, "who raided throughout the Aegean sea"; and to the Tursha (Turusha or Teresh), who were recorded by Egyptian sources at the time of pharaohs Merneptah and Ramses II. Some biblical commentators also propose a possible connection with the city of Troy, known in the Hittite language as Taruisa. These identifications derive from pre-critical biblical commentary and are not considered historically valid by modern archaeologists or historians. The Table of Nations in Genesis 10 reflects a schematic theological geography rather than a record of historical migrations, and the connection between the Tyrsenoi/Tursha and the Etruscans lacks any substantive archaeological or genetic support.

Others (including Daniel G. Brinton) have suggested Tiras is the progenitor of the indigenous peoples of the Americas.
