= Cush (Bible) =

Biblical character

Personal life
- Children: Nimrod, Seba, Havilah, Sabtah, Sabtechah
- Parent: Ham (father)

Cush or Kush (/kʊʃ, kʌʃ/ Hebrew: כּוּשׁ Kūš; Ge'ez: ኩሽ), according to the Hebrew Bible, was the oldest son of Ham and a grandson of Noah. He was the brother of Mizraim, Phut, and Canaan. Cush was the father of Nimrod and Havilah.

Cush is traditionally considered the ancestor of the "Land of Cush", an ancient territory said to be situated south of Egypt around the river Gihon (Gen. 2:13). Cush is identified in the Bible with the Kingdom of Kush or ancient Aethiopia. The Cushitic languages are also named after Cush.

== Identification ==
V31 G1 N37 N25
kꜣš
in hieroglyphs
Era: 1st Intermediate Period
(2181–2055 BC)

V31 N37 T14 N25
kš
in hieroglyphs
Era: Middle Kingdom
(2055–1650 BC)

Cush is a Hebrew name that is possibly derived from Kash, the Egyptian name of Upper Nubia and later of the Nubian kingdom at Napata, known as the Kingdom of Kush. Alternatively the biblical name may be a mistranslation of the Mesopotamian city of Kish.

The form Kush appears in Egyptian records as early as the reign of Mentuhotep II (21st century BC), in an inscription detailing his campaigns against the Nubian region. At the time of the compilation of the Hebrew Bible, and throughout classical antiquity, the Nubian kingdom was centered at Meroë in modern-day Sudan.

Biblical scholar Kevin Burrell argues that Cush in the Table of Nations should be identified with Meluhha, a placename originally referring to a region east of Mesopotamia but which starting from the mid-2nd millennium BC onwards became equated with the territory of Kush in Nubia. According to Burrell, this explains both Cush's Mesopotamian connections in the biblical narrative through his son Nimrod and the fact that his name derives from a Nubian kingdom.

== References in the Bible ==
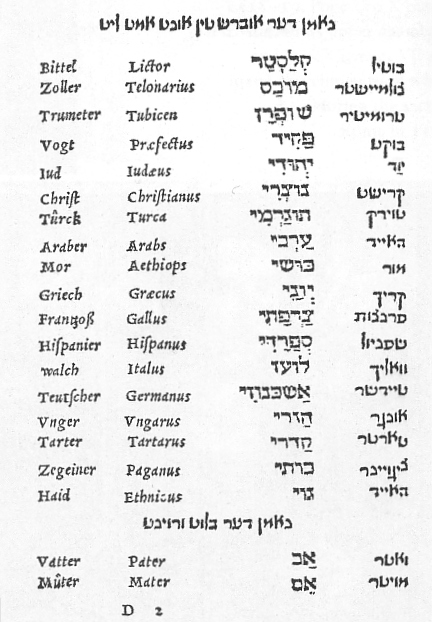
A page from Elia Levita's 16th-century Yiddish–Hebrew–Latin–German dictionary contains a list of nations, including the word "כושי" Cushite or Cushi, translated to Latin as "Aethiops" and into German as "Mor".

Cush's sons were Nimrod, Seba, Havilah, Sabtah, Raamah, and Sabtechah. The genealogy in 1 Chronicles 1 also refers to Cush and his sons.

In Numbers 12:1, Moses is said to have married a "Cushite woman" (אִשָּׁה כֻשִׁית, ishah kushit), provoking criticism from his siblings Miriam and Aaron:

Miriam and Aaron spoke against Moses because of the Cushite woman he had married, for he had married a Cushite woman.

— Numbers 12:1, Hebrew Bible

== Traditional identifications ==
Josephus gives an account of the nation of Cush, son of Ham and grandson of Noah: "For of the four sons of Ham, time has not at all hurt the name of Cush; for the Ethiopians, over whom he reigned, are even at this day, both by themselves and by all men in Asia, called Cushites" (Antiquities of the Jews 1.6).

Josephus uses "Ethiopians" in the classical sense, referring to Kingdom of Kush centered in Napata and Meroë in modern-day Sudan. The biblical Cush is geographically associated with this region, not with modern Ethiopia.

The identity of this woman has been widely debated in biblical scholarship. In the Book of Exodus, Moses's wife is named as Zipporah, daughter of Jethro, the priest of Midian (Exodus 2:15–21). Midian is traditionally located in the northwest Arabian Peninsula, not in the region of Cush, which is generally understood in biblical geography to lie south of Egypt, corresponding to Nubia or ancient Sudan.

Some commentators interpret "Cushite" in Numbers 12:1 as figurative or descriptive, referring to Zipporah’s skin tone or foreign status, while others argue it may refer to a second wife of Moses, distinct from Zipporah. An important Hellenistic Jewish source, Ezekiel the Tragedian’s Exagoge (2nd century BCE), offers an alternative version of Zipporah’s origin. In fragment 60–65, preserved in Eusebius’s Praeparatio Evangelica (9.29.7–8), Zipporah describes her homeland as Libya, a Greek term broadly used for regions west and south of Egypt. She refers to her father as ruler of a land inhabited by "Aethiopians, dark men":

Stranger, this land is called Libya. It is inhabited by tribes of various peoples, Aethiopians, dark men. One man is the ruler of the land: he is both king and general. He rules the state, judges the people, and is priest. This man is my father and theirs.

This dramatic retelling reimagines Zipporah as hailing from an African kingdom populated by Ethiopians (Greek: Aithiopes), a term often used in antiquity to refer to Nubians or dark-skinned peoples of the Upper Nile. Scholars view Exagoge as an example of how Hellenistic Jews integrated biblical narratives with Greek geographical and ethnographic understandings, possibly offering a literary attempt to reconcile “Cushite woman” in Numbers with Moses’s wife.

In the Jeremiah story, when the Babylonians and Judahites were in conflict and Jeremiah was giving prophecies of doom for the Judean king, Jeremiah's princely adversaries cast him into a Jerusalem cistern. "Ebed-melech the Cushite" became the hero of the story by approaching the king and getting permission to extricate the prophet from his prison. (Jer 38: 4–10)

During the 5th century AD, Aramean and Assyrian Christian writers sometimes described the Himyarites of South Arabia as Cushaeans and Aethiopians.

The Persian historian al-Tabari (c. 915) recounts a tradition that the wife of Cush was named Qarnabil, daughter of Batawil, son of Tiras, and that she bore him the "Abyssinians, Sindis and Indians".

Explorer James Bruce, who visited the Ethiopian Highlands c. 1770, wrote of "a tradition among the Abyssinians, which they say they have had since time immemorial", that in the days after the Deluge, Cush, the son of Ham, traveled with his family up the Nile until they reached the Atbara plain, then still uninhabited, from where they could see the Ethiopian table-land. There they ascended and built Axum, and sometime later returned to the lowland, building Meroë. He also states that European scholars of his own day had summarily rejected this account on grounds of their established theory, that Cush must have arrived in Africa via Arabia and the Bab-el-Mandeb, a strait located between Yemen on the Arabian Peninsula, and Djibouti and Eritrea on the Horn of Africa. Further, the great obelisk of Axum was said to have been erected by Cush in order to mark his allotted territory, and his son Ityopp'is was said to have been buried there, according to the Book of Aksum, which Bruce asserts was revered throughout Abyssinia equally with the Kebra Nagast.

Scholars like Johann Michaelis and Rosenmuller have pointed out that the name Cush was applied to tracts of country on both sides of the Red Sea, in the Arabian Peninsula (Yemen) and Northeast Africa.

Professor Francis Brown suggested that the Cushites referred to both African and Asiatic peoples, with the latter being identified as the Kassites. Brown believes that the Cushites in the Book of Genesis, such as Nimrod, were Asiatics based on contextual information. The Asiatic theory has been supported by archaeologists such as Juris Zarins.
