= Anamim =

Biblical character

Anamim (Hebrew: עֲנָמִים, ‘Ănāmīm) is, according to the Bible, either a son of Ham's son Mizraim or the name of a people descending from him. Biblical scholar Donald E. Gowan describes their identity as "completely unknown."

The name should perhaps be attached to a people in North Africa, probably in the surrounding area of Egypt. Medieval biblical exegete, Saadia Gaon, identified the Anamim with the indigenous people of Alexandria, in Egypt.

== See also ==
- Generations of Noah
