= Lasha =

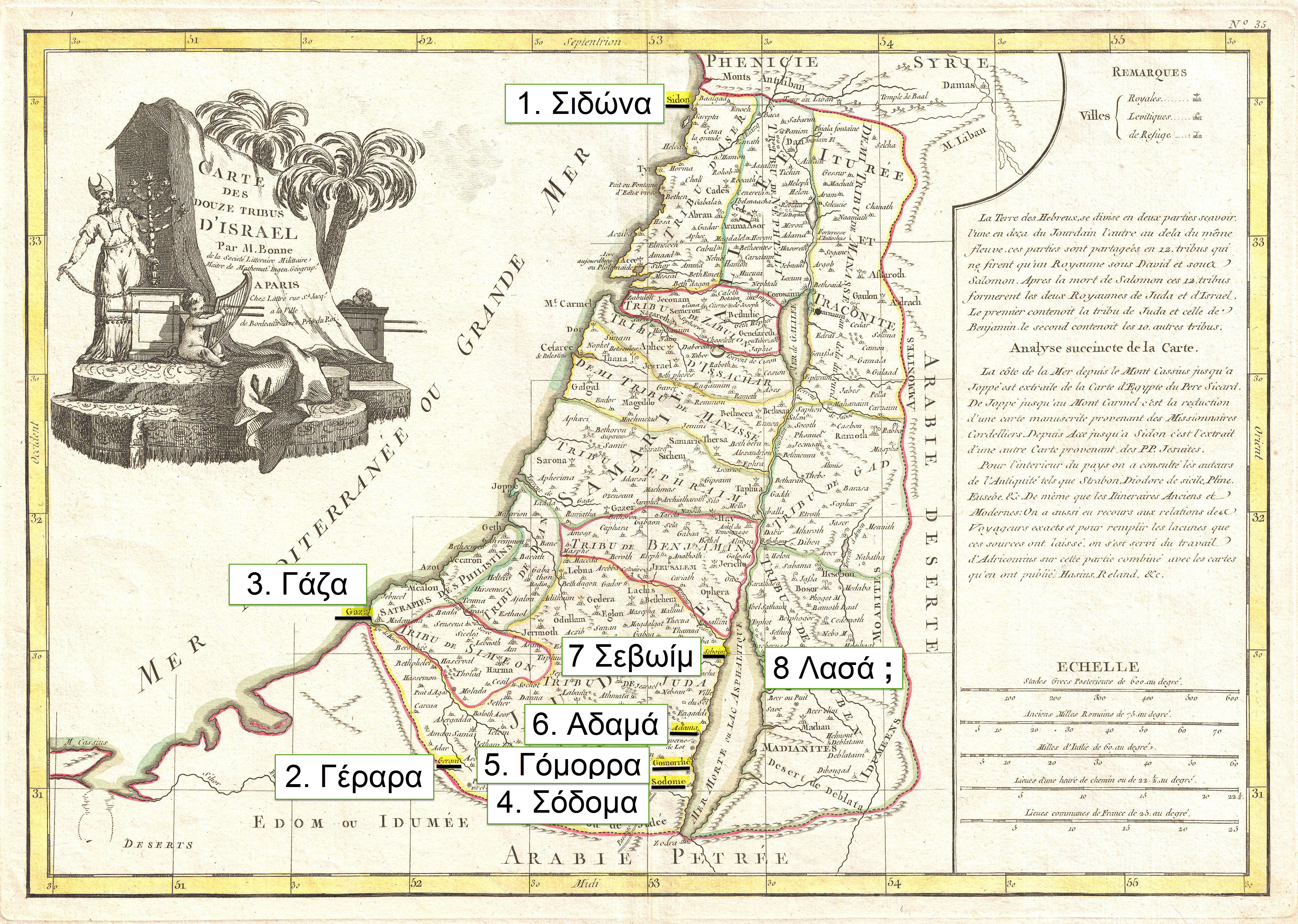
The locations mentioned in Genesis 10.19 as the limits of Canaanites

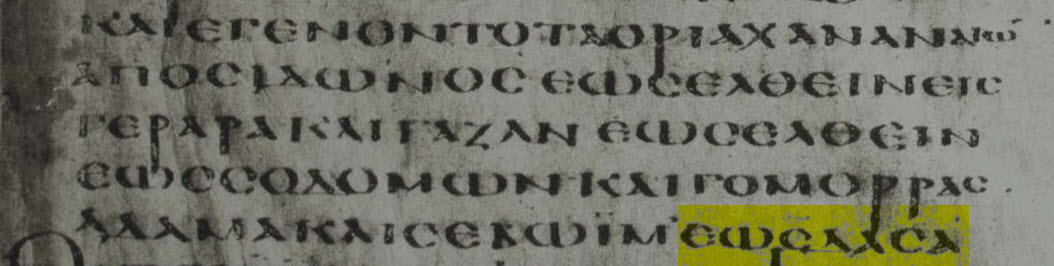
Codex Alexandrinus, Genesis 10 19, the part mentioning the words «ΕΩΣ ΔΑΣΑ» (or «ΕΩΣ ΛΑΣΑ»)

Lasha, meaning fissure is a place apparently east of the Dead Sea, mentioned in Genesis 10:19, shown as "8 Λάσα" in the accompanying map. It was later known as Callirrhoe, a place famous for its hot springs.
