= Casluhim =

Ancient Egyptian people mentioned in the Bible and related literature

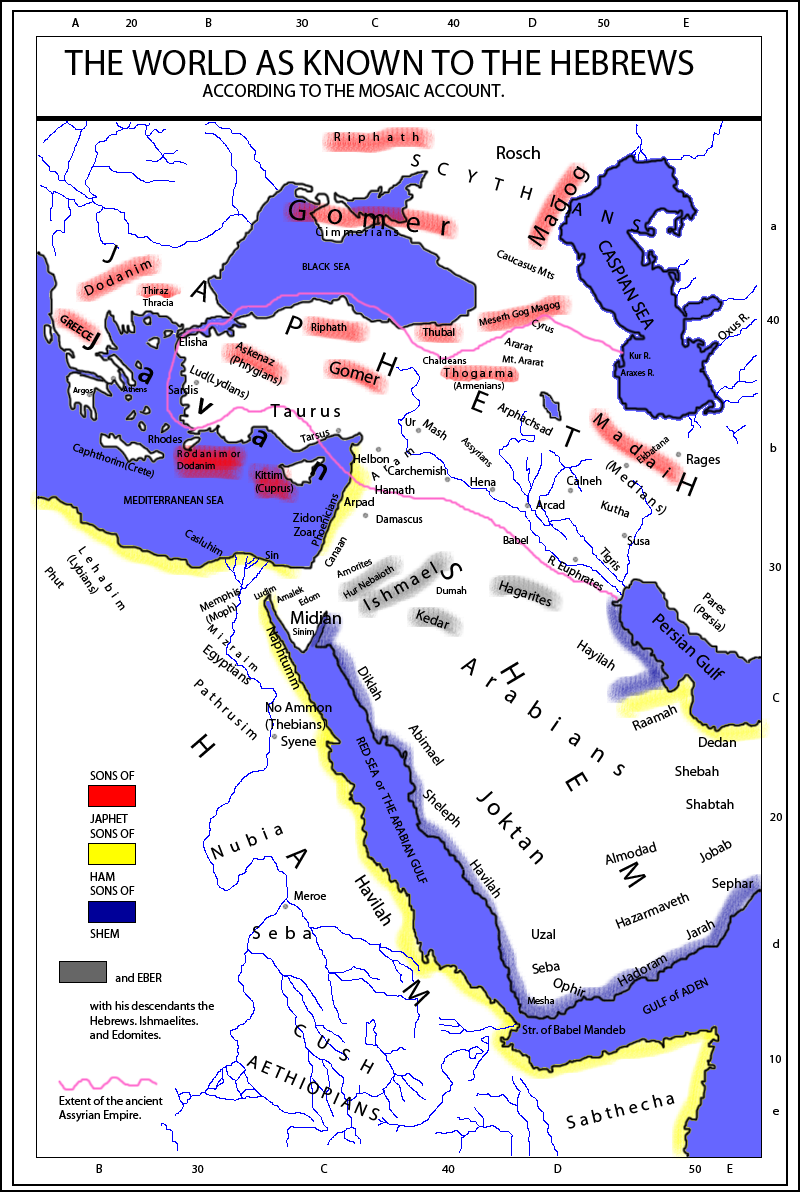
One reconstruction of the Generations of Noah, placing the "Casluhim" in the western Nile Delta.

The Casluhim or Casluhites (Hebrew: כסלחים) were an ancient Egyptian people mentioned in the Bible and related literature.

== Biblical accounts ==
According to the Book of Genesis (Genesis 10:14) and the Books of Chronicles (1 Chronicles 1:12), the Casluhim were descendants of Mizraim (Egypt) son of Ham, out of whom originated the Philistines.

== Archaeology ==
In the Aramaic Targums their region is called Pentpolitai understood to be derived from the Greek Pentapolis which locates the area as the north west in what is now the Cyrenaica region of Libya. Another name for their region is Pekosim used in Bereshit Rabbah 37.

== Identifications ==
Josephus mentions the Casluhim in his Jewish Antiquities I, vi, 2 as one of the Egyptian peoples whose cities were destroyed during the Ethiopic War and who thus disappeared from history. Arab historian Ibn Khaldun (1332–1406), citing Abu Bakr bin Yahya al-Suli, wrote that the Berbers of North Africa were descended from Casluhim, the son of Mizraïm (قبط بن مصر).

In Saadia Gaon's Judeo-Arabic translation of the Pentateuch, the Sa'idi people (i.e. the people of Upper Egypt) are listed in the position of the Casluhim in Genesis 10:14, while Albiyim is listed in the position of Pathrusim, however the ordering of Casluhim and Pathrusim sometimes vary in translations and the mainstream understanding is that it is the Pathrusim who are the Sahidic people and the Casluhim the people of eastern Libya.

Matthew Poole suggests that Casluhim and Caphtorim were brother tribes who lived in the same territory, presumably in Crete.

However, others (including Samuel Bochart) have identified Casluhim with the Colchians, noting that ancient sources including Herodotus and Jerome described the Colchians as being of Egyptian origin. However, claims from antiquity positing an Egyptian origin of the Colchians have been rejected by modern scholars.

== See also ==
- Generations of Noah

== Sources ==
- Fehling, Detlev (1994). "The art of Herodotus and the margins of the world". In von Martels, Z.R.W.M. (ed.). Travel Fact and Travel Fiction: Studies on fiction, literary tradition, scholarly discovery, and observation in travel writing. Brill's Studies in Intellectual History Volume 55. Leiden, NL: Brill. pp. 1–15. ISBN 978-90-04-10112-8.
- Hendel, Ronald (2024). Genesis 1-11: A New Translation with Introduction and Commentary. The Anchor Yale Bible Commentaries. Yale University Press. ISBN 978-0-300-14973-9.
- Marincola, John (2001). Greek Historians. Oxford, UK: Oxford University Press. ISBN 978-0-19-922501-9.
