= Mizraim =

Hebrew and Aramaic name for the land of Egypt

Mizraim (Hebrew: מִצְרַיִם / מִצְרָיִם, Modern Mīṣrayīm [mitsˈʁajim] Tiberian Mīṣrāyīm / Mīṣráyīm [misˤˈrɔjim] \ [misˤˈrajim]; cf. Arabic: مصر, romanized: Miṣr) is the Hebrew and Aramaic name for the land of Egypt and its people.

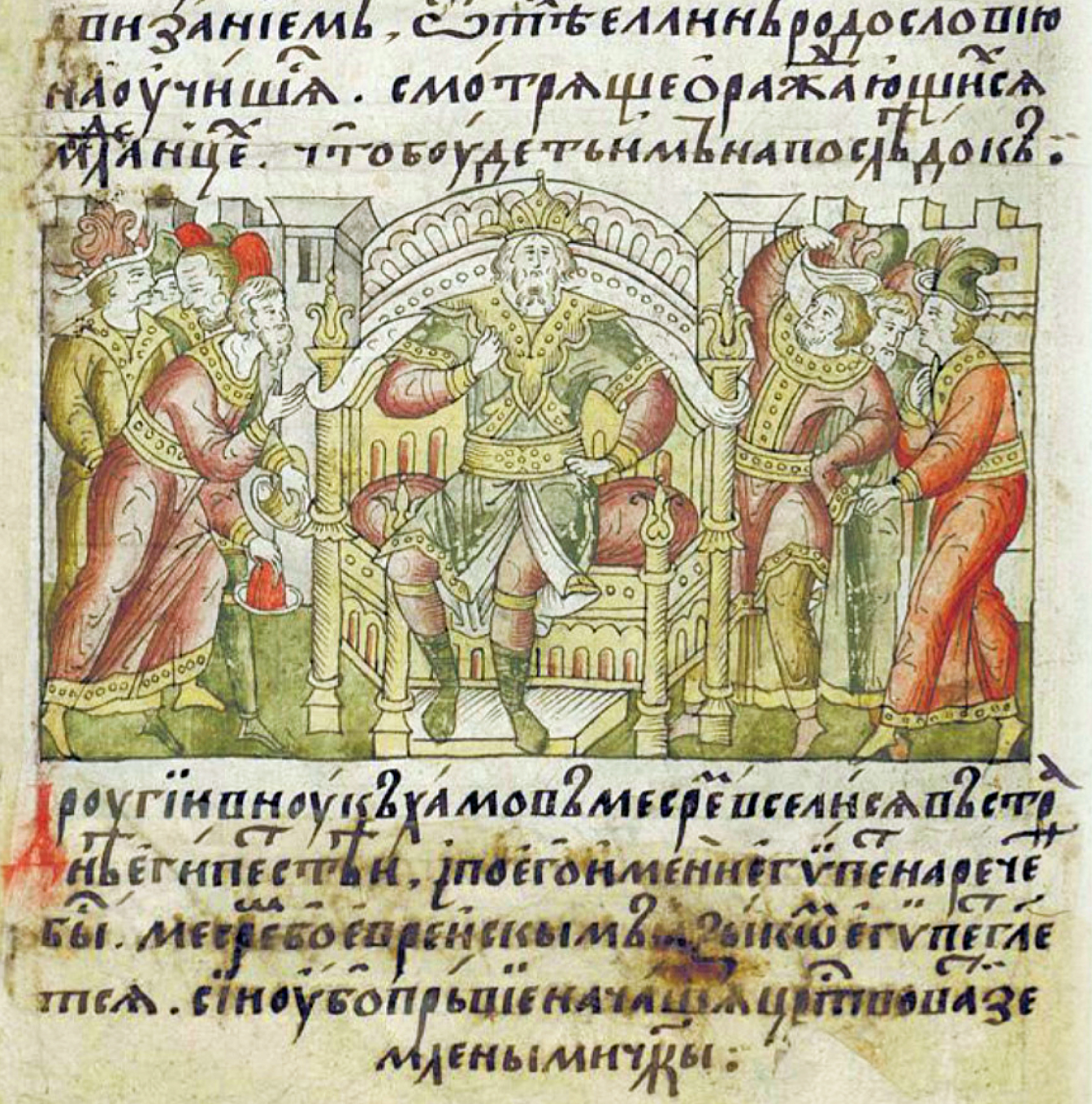
Mizraim - king of Egypt

== Linguistic analysis ==
Mizraim is the Hebrew cognate of a common Semitic source word for the land now known as Egypt. It is similar to Miṣr in modern Arabic, Misri in the 14th century B.C. Akkadian Amarna tablets, Mṣrm in Ugaritic, Mizraim in Neo-Babylonian texts, and Mu-ṣur in neo-Assyrian Akkadian (as seen on the Rassam cylinder). To this root is appended the dual suffix -āyim, perhaps referring to the "two Egypts": Upper Egypt and Lower Egypt. This word is similar in pronunciation and spelling to the Hebrew words matsór and meitsár, meaning literally "siege" and "strait, distress" respectively, and may carry those connotations to Hebrew speakers.

== Biblical accounts ==
According to Genesis 10:6, Mizraim, son of Ham, was the younger brother of Cush and elder brother of Phut and Canaan, whose families together made up the Hamite branch of Noah's descendants. Some translations, such as the English Standard Version, refer to Mizraim as "Egypt". Mizraim's sons were Ludim, Anamim, Lehabim, Naphtuhim, Pathrusim, Casluhim, and Caphtorim. 19th-century scholar Henry Welsford identifies this Mizraim of Egypt in the Book of Genesis as Minos.

In the Book of Exodus, it is considered the "house of bondage". Regarding Passover, Moses says to the Israelites, "And Moses said to the people, 'Remember this day, on which you went free from Egypt, the house of bondage, how יהוה freed you from it with a mighty hand: no leavened bread shall be eaten.'"

The Book of Deuteronomy forbids the children of Israel from abhorring a Mizri, an Egyptian, "because you were a stranger in his land".

== Greco-Roman sources ==
According to Eusebius's Chronicon, Manetho had suggested that the great age of antiquity of which the later Egyptians boasted had preceded the Great Flood and that they were descended from Mizraim, who settled there anew. According to Byzantine chronicler George Syncellus, the Book of Sothis, attributed to Manetho, identified Mizraim with the legendary first pharaoh, Menes, who is said to have unified the Old Kingdom of Egypt and built Memphis. Mizraim also seems to correspond to Misor, who is said in Phoenician mythology to have been the father of Taautus, who was given Egypt, and later scholars noticed that it also recalls Menes, whose son or successor was said to be Athothis.

== Islamic sources ==
According to medieval Islamic historians, such as Sibt ibn al-Jawzi, the Egyptian ibn 'Abd al-Hakam, and the Persians al-Tabari and Muhammad Khwandamir, the pyramids, etc. had been built by the wicked races before the Deluge but that Noah's descendant Mizraim (Masar or Mesr) was later entrusted with reoccupying the region. The Islamic accounts also make Masar the son of a Bansar or Beisar and grandson of Ham, rather than a direct son of Ham, and add that he lived to the age of 700.

== Bibliography ==
- Brooks, Joshua William (1841), The history of the Hebrew nation: from its origin to the present time, R.B. Seeley and W. Burnside
