= Raamah =

Biblical character

Raamah (Hebrew: רַעְמָה, Raʿmā) is a name found in the Torah, meaning "lofty" or "exalted", and possibly "thunder".

The name is first mentioned as the fourth son of Cush, who is the son of Ham, who is the son of Noah in Gen. 10:7, and later appears as a country that traded with the Phoenician city-state of Tyre, in Ezekiel 27:22. It has been connected with Rhammanitae mentioned by Strabo in the southwest Arabian Peninsula, and with an Arabian city of Regmah at the head of the Persian Gulf.

This country of Raamah is usually assumed to be somewhere in the region of Yemen; Sheba was a son of Raamah, and his descendants are often held to be included among the Sabaeans. Dedan, son of Raamah. Apparently a region of the Medina Province of Saudi Arabia.

However, there was also an Israelite city called Ramah, somewhat closer to Tyre.

== See also ==
- Rama
