= Ludim =

Possible Hebrew term for the Lydians

Ludim (Hebrew: לודים, romanized: Lūḏîm) is the Hebrew term for a people mentioned in Jeremiah and Ezekiel. In the Biblical Table of Nations Genesis 10:13 they were descended from Mizraim.

According to Josephus, their land was in Libya which was west of Egypt near the tribes of Phut in the land of the Moors towards the extreme west of Africa and the Atlantic Ocean. Pliny in his natural history mentions the river Laud along south of the Atlas Mountains near the river Fut (Phut). Medieval biblical exegete Saadia Gaon, identifies the Ludim with Tanisiin, and which R. Yosef Qafih thought may have been referring to the inhabitants of Tunis.

These Ludim should not be confused with another group who were said to descend from Lud, son of Shem, son of Noah.

Ludim is sometimes thought to be a scribal error for Lubim, in reference to Libyans.

The biblical scholar Victor P. Hamilton believes that the available evidence "suggests" that the Ludim are the Lydians.
