= Pathrusim =

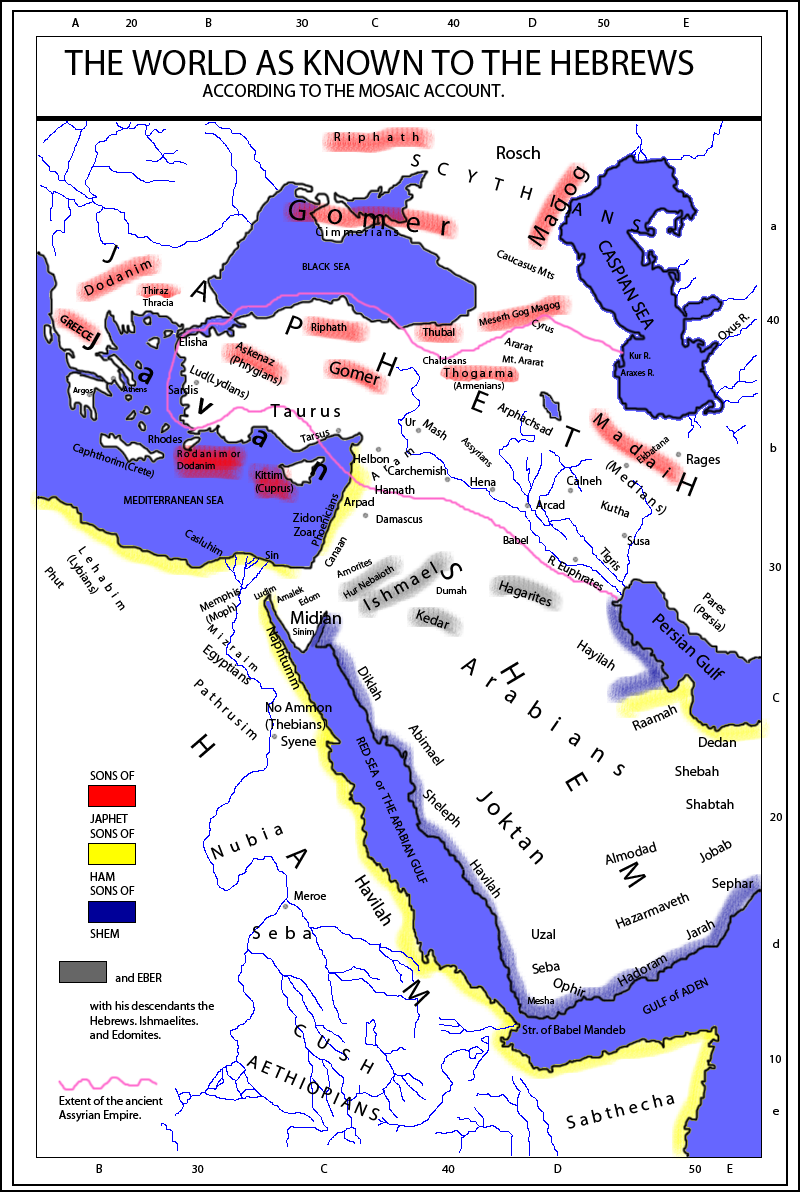
A map of the Generations of Noah, placing the "Pathrusim" in Upper Egypt.

Pathrusim together with Casluhim were descendants of Mizraim (i.e., Egypt) according to the genealogies in Genesis, who inhabited Pathros (i.e., Upper Egypt).

In Saadia Gaon's Judeo-Arabic translation of the Pentateuch, the Sa'idi people (i.e. the people of Upper Egypt) are listed in the position of the Casluhim in Genesis 10:14, while Albiyim is listed in the position of Pathrusim, however the ordering of Casluhim and Pathrusim sometimes vary in translations and the mainstream understanding is that it is the Pathrusim who are the Sahidic people and the Casluhim the people of eastern Libya.

In the Book of Jasher, the Pathrusim and Casluhim intermarried resulting in the Pelishtim, Azathim, Gerarim, Githim and Ekronim.

== See also ==
- Generations of Noah
