= Seba (Bible) =

Biblical figure

Seba (Biblical Hebrew: סְבָא, romanized: Səḇāʾ) was the son of Cush according to Genesis 10:7 and 1 Chronicles 1:9, and also by extension the name of a people and region mentioned in Isaiah 43:3, Isaiah 45:14 and Psalm 72:10.

Psalm 72:10 and Isaiah 43:3 both imply that Seba was a wealthy kingdom. The land of Seba is usually located in South Arabia or the Horn of Africa. On balance, the biblical evidence points to an African location. Both passages in Isaiah associate it with Egypt and Kush. In the Septuagint version of 43:3, Seba is translated as Syene (Aswan), while the Sebaites of 45:14 are described as tall, an adjective elsewhere in Isaiah applied to the related Cushites.

During his campaigns against Aethiopia, Cambyses II subdued the natives bordering southern Egypt, particularly those residing in the city of Nysa who observed sacred festivals in honor of Dionysus. According to Herodotus, and others, the Aethiopian capital, originally called "Seba," was later renamed Meroë by Cambyses II in honor of his sister Meroë, who accompanied him to Egypt and died there. This act marked the historical fulfillment of the prophecy in Isaiah 43:3, where God (Yahweh) declares Egypt, Aethiopia (Cush), and Seba as a ransom for Israel's redemption; conquests achieved not by Cyrus the Great who liberated the Jews from Babylon, but by his son and successor Cambyses II. The conquest and subsequent renaming of Meroë also align with biblical references to the distant "Sabeans," whom David Masson associate with the ancient Macrobians, evoking the prophetic mention in Isaiah 45:14 of tall and distinctive peoples from Cush submitting to God's purpose.

August Dillmann first proposed in 1892 that Sheba (Saba) and Seba were on opposite sides of the Red Sea, with the latter reflecting the presence of Sabaeans in the Horn of Africa. According to John McClintock, they were of Qahtanite extraction. In inscriptions in the Sabaean language from the 6th century BC, local rulers bear the title "mukarrib of Dʿmt and Saba", probably indicating thereby the highlands and the coast, respectively.
