= Kadmonites =

The Kadmonites (Hebrew: בְּנֵי קֶדֶם, romanized: bnei qedem, "sons of the East" ; adjectival: קַדְמֹנִי, qaḏmōnī, "easterners") were, according to the Hebrew Bible, the peoples mentioned as inhabiting the land promised by God in a covenant to Abraham in Genesis 15:19.

The identity of Kadmonites is unknown. According to M.G. Easton's Bible Dictionary, the Kadmonites inhabited the northeastern part of Palestine, and it is supposed that they are identical to the "children of the east", which inhabited the land between Palestine and the Euphrates.

According to the Jewish Encyclopedia, R. Judah b. Hai identified the Kadmonites with the Nabateans. Encyclopaedia Judaica writes that opinions diverge as to the identity of the tribes of the Kenites, Kenizzites and Kadmonites: a plausible interpretation laid forward by R. Judah is that they were Arab tribes bordering Canaan; another interpretation by R. Eliezer is that the tribes refer to Asia Minor, Thrace and Carthage. Jewish tradition regards the term as being identical to Bnei Kedem ("Children of the East") a designation of the relatives of the Hebrews who lived east of them.
