= Girgashites =

Indigenous tribe

Girgashites (Hebrew: גִּרְגָּשִׁי) are one of the tribes who had invaded the land of Canaan as mentioned in Gen. 15:21; Deut. 7:1; Josh. 3:10; Neh. 9:8. The Girgashites are also known as the fifth ethnic group that descended from Canaan (Gen. 10:16; i Chron. 1:14). Although the Girgashites are not referred to in the narrative of the wars of conquests, and their locality is not stated, they are named by Joshua among the peoples the Israelites dispossessed (24:11). The Jerusalem Talmud claims that they migrated to North Africa prior to the Israelites entering the land.

They have been tentatively identified with the Karkisha, allies of the Hittites in their wars with Rameses II. If that identification is correct, the Girgashites would have lived in the western coast of Asia Minor and maintained close relations with their neighbours to the south during that period. A name grgš appears in Ugaritic both as part of the personal name bn grgš and as a place name.

Herodotus wrote of a city called Gergis in the western coast of Asia Minor, whose inhabitants he calls "those left by the Teucrians". The Teucrians have been identified with the Sea Peoples known as Tjeker mentioned in Egyptian sources. Meanwhile, Athenaeus called the local inhabitants of Miletus Gergites and Xenophon described the Gergites as neighbours of Troy.

The Girgashites have also been discussed in relation to the place Gergesa.
