= Put (biblical figure) =

Third son of Ham in the biblical Table of Nations

Phut or Put (Biblical Hebrew: פּוּט, romanized: Pūṭ; Koine Greek: Φουδ, romanized: Phoud) is the third son of Ham, son of Noah in the biblical Generations of Noah in the Book of Genesis, 10:6 and 1 Chronicles 1:8.

The name Put is used in the Bible for Ancient Libya, but some scholars propose that it refers to the Land of Punt known from ancient Egyptian annals.

== Biblical references ==
Genesis 10:6 and 1 Chronicles 1:8 refer to Put or Phut in the Table of Nations. Nahum 3:9 states that "Put and Lubim" were the helpers of Egypt. Other biblical verses consistently refer to the descendants of Put as warriors. In Jeremiah 46:9, they are again described as being supporters of Egypt. Ezekiel mentions them three times: in 27:10, as supporters of Tyre (Phoenicia), in 30:5 again as supporting Egypt, and in 38:5, as supporters of Gog. The Hebrew Bible substitutes Put in Ezekiel where the Septuagint Greek (LXX) refers to Libues. However, the Hebrew reads Pul in Isaiah 66:19, in place of Put in the Septuagint.

== Historical records ==
Epiphanius writes: "Thus Mistrem was allotted Egypt, Cush, Aethiopia, Put, Axum, Ragman and Sabteka and [Dedan, also called Judad], the region bordering on Garama."

Josephus writes: "Phut also was the founder of Libya, and called the inhabitants Phutites (Phoutes), from himself: there is also a river in the country of Moors which bears that name; whence it is that we may see the greatest part of the Grecian historiographers mention that river and the adjoining country by the appellation of Phut (Phoute): but the name it has now has been by change given it from one of the sons of Mezraim, who was called Lybyos."

Pliny the Elder and Ptolemy both place the river Phuth on the west side of Mauretania. Ptolemy also mentions a city Putea in Libya (iv.3.39). A Libyan connection has likewise been inferred from Nahum 3:9.

The Libyan tribe of pỉdw shows up in Egyptian records by the 22nd dynasty, while a Ptolemaic text from Edfu refers to the t3 n nꜣ pỉt.w "the land of the Pitu". The word was later written in Demotic as Pỉt, and as Phaiat in Coptic, a name for Libya Aegypti, northwestern Egypt.

A fragment of Nebuchadnezzar II's annals mentions his campaign in 567 BC in Egypt, and defeating the soldiers of Pu-ṭu-ia-a-man, i.e. Greek Libya (Cyrene). A multilingual stele from al-Kabrīt, dating to the reign of Darius I refers to the Put as the province of Putāya (Old Persian) and Puṭa (Neo-Babylonian), where the equivalent text written in Egyptian has tꜣ ṯmḥw "Libya".

== See also ==
- Libya (satrapy)

== Bibliography ==
- Baker, David W. 1992. "Put", in The Anchor Bible Dictionary, edited by David Noel Freedman. Vol. 5 of 6 vols. New York: Doubleday. 560
- Graefe, Erhart. 1975. "Der libysche Stammesname p(j)d(j)/pjt im spätzeitlichen Onomastikon." Enchoria: Zeitschrift für Demotistik und Koptologie 5:13–17.
