= Gaul =

Historical region of Western Europe inhabited by Celtic tribes

Gaul c. 58 BC, on the eve of the Gallic Wars. The Romans divided Gaul into five parts: Gallia Celtica (largely corresponding to the later province Gallia Lugdunensis), Gallia Belgica, Gallia Cisalpina, Gallia Narbonensis, and Gallia Aquitania.

Gaul (Latin: Gallia) was a region of Western Europe first clearly described by the Romans, encompassing present-day Belgium, France, Luxembourg, and parts of Germany, Netherlands, Northern Italy and Switzerland. It covered an area of 494,000 km^{2} (191,000 mi^{2}). Archaeologically, the Gauls were bearers of the La Tène culture during the 5th to 1st centuries BC. This material culture was found throughout Gaul and as far east as modern-day southern Poland, Slovakia, and Hungary.

Roman control of Gaul lasted for five centuries, until the collapse of the Western Roman empire. Already in 387 BC warbands led by the Gaul Brennos sacked Rome, becoming the only time Rome was conquered by a foreign enemy in 800 years. However, Gallia Cisalpina was conquered by the Romans in 204 BC and Gallia Narbonensis in 123 BC. Gaul was invaded after 120 BC by the Cimbri and the Teutons, who were in turn defeated by the Romans by 103 BC. Julius Caesar finally subdued the largest part of Gaul in his campaigns from 58 to 51 BC. According to his account, non-Roman Gaul at that time was divided into three parts: Gallia Celtica, Gallia Belgica, and Gallia Aquitania.

While the Gauls shifted from a primarily Celtic culture during Late Antiquity, becoming amalgamated into a Gallo-Roman culture, Gallia remained the conventional name of the territory throughout the Early Middle Ages, until it acquired a new identity as the Capetian Kingdom of France in the high medieval period. Gallia remains a name of France in modern Greek (Γαλλία) and modern Latin (alongside the alternatives Francia and Francogallia). The Catholic Archbishop of Lyon still holds the title of "Primate of the Gauls" today. The term "Gallicanism"—referring to a politico-religious movement—also derives its etymology from Gaul.

== Etymology ==
The Greek and Latin names Galatia (first attested by Timaeus of Tauromenium in the 4th century BC) and Gallia are ultimately derived from a Celtic ethnic term or tribe Gal(a)-to-. The Galli of Gallia Celtica were reported to refer to themselves as Celtae by Caesar. Hellenistic etymology connected the name of the Galatians (Γαλάται, Galátai) to the supposedly "milk-white" skin (γάλα, gála "milk") of the Gauls. There was longstanding historical debate over the origin of the name; François de Mézeray documents seven theories regarding its origins in his 17th-century Abrégé chronologique de l'histoire de France: along with the derivation from the Greek for "milk," these etymologies include one from a Hebrew word meaning "yellow," in reference to the Gauls' yellow hair, an etymology which Mézeray attributes to Samuel Bochart. Modern researchers say the name is related to Welsh gallu, Cornish: gallos, "capability, power", thus meaning "powerful people".

Despite its superficial similarity, the normal English translation of Gallia since the Middle Ages, Gaul, has a different origin from the Latin term. It stems from the French Gaule, deriving from the Old Frankish *Walholant (via a Latinized form *Walula), literally the "Land of the Foreigners/Romans". *Walho- is a reflex of the Proto-Germanic *walhaz, "foreigner, Romanized person", an exonym applied by Germanic speakers to Celts and Latin-speaking people indiscriminately. It is cognate with the names Wales, Cornwall, Wallonia, and Wallachia. The Germanic w- is regularly rendered as gu- / g- in French (cf. guerre "war", garder "ward", Guillaume "William"), and the historic diphthong au is the regular outcome of al before a following consonant (cf. cheval ~ chevaux). French Gaule or Gaulle cannot be derived from Latin Gallia, since g would become j before a (cf. gamba > jambe), and the diphthong au would be unexplained; the regular outcome of Latin Gallia is Jaille in French, which is found in several western place names, such as, La Jaille-Yvon and Saint-Mars-la-Jaille. Proto-Germanic *walha is derived ultimately from the name of the Volcae.

Also unrelated, in spite of superficial similarity, is the name Gael. (Note: Gael is derived from Old Irish Goidel (borrowed, in turn, in the 7th century AD from Primitive Welsh Guoidel—spelled Gwyddel in Middle Welsh and Modern Welsh—likely derived from a Brittonic root *Wēdelos meaning literally "forest person, wild man")) The Irish word gall did originally mean "a Gaul", i.e. an inhabitant of Gaul, but its meaning was later widened to "foreigner", to describe the Vikings, and later still the Normans. The dichotomic words gael and gall are sometimes used together for contrast, for instance in the 12th-century book Cogad Gáedel re Gallaib.

As adjectives, English has the two variants: Gaulish and Gallic. The two adjectives are used synonymously, as "pertaining to Gaul or the Gauls", although the Celtic language group once spoken in Gaul is predominantly known as Gaulish.

== History ==
=== Pre-Roman ===
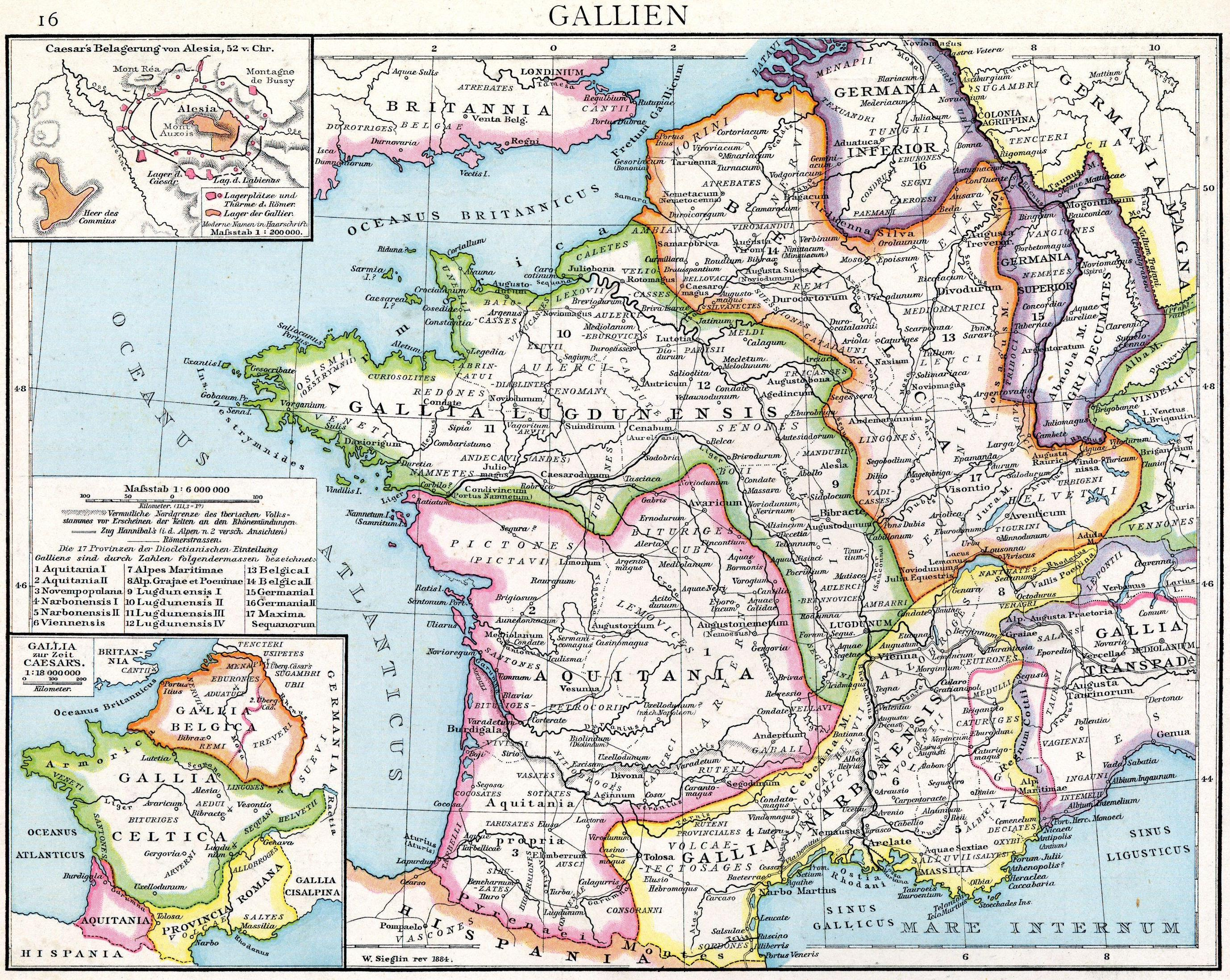
Map of Roman Gaul (Droysens Allgemeiner historischer Handatlas, 1886)

There is little written information concerning the peoples that inhabited the regions of Gaul, save what can be gleaned from coins. Therefore, the early history of the Gauls is predominantly a matter of archaeology, and the relationships between their material culture, genetic relationships (the study of which has been aided, in recent years, through the field of archaeogenetics) and linguistic divisions rarely coincide.

Before the rapid spread of the La Tène culture in the 5th to 4th centuries BC, the territory of eastern and southern Gaul already participated in the Late Bronze Age Urnfield culture (c. 12th to 8th centuries BC) out of which the early iron-working Hallstatt culture (7th to 6th centuries BC) would develop. By 500 BC, there is strong Hallstatt influence throughout most of Gaul (except for the Alps and the extreme north-west).

Out of this Hallstatt background, the La Tène culture arose during the 7th and 6th century BC, presumably representing an early form of Continental Celtic culture and likely under Mediterranean influence from the Greek, Phoenician, and Etruscan civilizations. This culture spread out along the Seine, the Middle Rhine and the upper Elbe. By the late 5th century BC, La Tène influence spread rapidly across the entire territory of Gaul. The La Tène culture developed and flourished during the late Iron Age (from 450 BC to the Roman conquest in the 1st century BC) not only in what is now France but also what is now Switzerland, northern Italy, Austria, southern Germany, Bohemia, Moravia, Slovakia and Hungary. A major archaeogenetics study uncovered a migration into southern Britain in the Bronze Age, during the 500-year period from 1300 to 800 BC. The newcomers were genetically most closely related to ancient individuals from Gaul. The authors describe this as a "plausible vector for the spread of early Celtic languages into Britain".

The major source of early information on the Celts of Gaul is Poseidonios of Apamea, whose writings were quoted by Timagenes, Julius Caesar, the Sicilian Greek Diodorus Siculus, and the Greek geographer Strabo. In the 4th and early 3rd century BC, Gallic tribal confederations expanded far beyond the territory of what would become Roman Gaul (which defines usage of the term "Gaul" today), into Pannonia, Illyria, northern Italy, Transylvania and even Asia Minor. By the 2nd century BC, the Romans described Gallia Transalpina as distinct from Gallia Cisalpina. In his Gallic Wars, Julius Caesar distinguishes among three ethnic groups in Gaul: the Belgae in the north (roughly between the Rhine and the Seine), the Celtae in the center and in Armorica, and the Aquitani in the southwest, the southeast being already colonized by the Romans. While some scholars believe the Belgae north of the Somme were a mixture of Celtic and Germanic elements, their ethnic affiliations have not been definitively resolved.

In addition to the Gauls, there were other peoples living in Gaul, such as the Greeks and Phoenicians who had established outposts such as Massilia (present-day Marseille) along the Mediterranean coast. Also, along the southeastern French Mediterranean coast, the Ligures had merged with the Celts to form a Celto-Ligurian culture.

=== Roman conquest ===
In the 2nd century BC Mediterranean Gaul had an extensive urban fabric and was prosperous. Archeologists know of cities in northern Gaul including the Biturigian capital of Avaricum (Bourges), Cenabum (Orléans), Autricum (Chartres) and the excavated site of Bibracte near Autun in Saône-et-Loire, along with a number of hill forts (or oppida) used in times of war. The prosperity of Mediterranean Gaul encouraged Rome to respond to pleas for assistance from the inhabitants of Massilia, who found themselves under attack by a coalition of Ligures and Gauls. The Romans intervened in Gaul in 154 BC and again in 125 BC. Whereas on the first occasion they came and went, on the second they stayed. In 122 BC Domitius Ahenobarbus managed to defeat the Allobroges (allies of the Salluvii), while in the ensuing year Quintus Fabius Maximus "destroyed" an army of the Arverni led by their king Bituitus, who had come to the aid of the Allobroges. Rome allowed Massilia to keep its lands, but added to its own territories the lands of the conquered tribes. As a direct result of these conquests, Rome now controlled an area extending from the Pyrenees to the lower Rhône river, and in the east up the Rhône valley to Lake Geneva. By 121 BC Romans had conquered the Mediterranean region called Provincia (later named Gallia Narbonensis). This conquest upset the ascendancy of the Gaulish Arverni peoples.

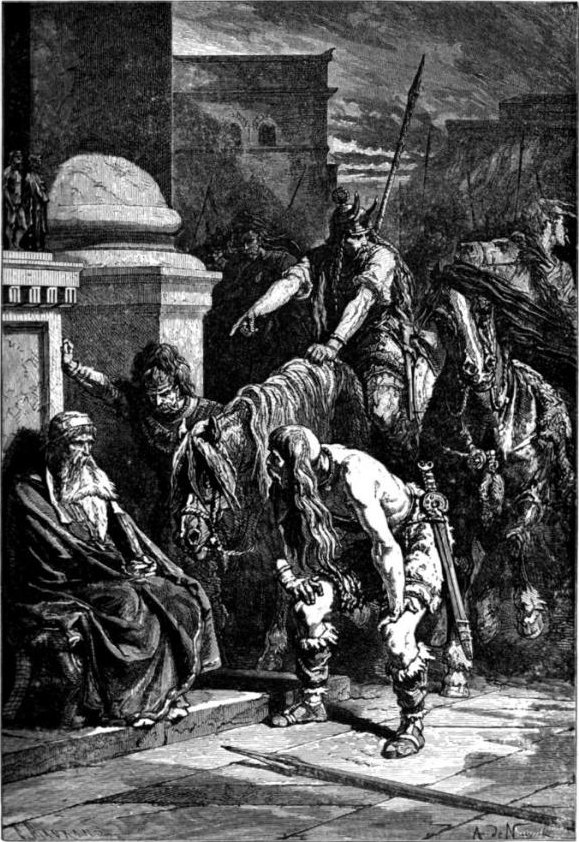
Gauls in Rome

The Roman proconsul and general Julius Caesar led his army into Gaul in 58 BC, ostensibly to assist Rome's Gaulish allies against the migrating Helvetii. With the help of various Gallic tribes (e.g., the Aedui) he managed to conquer nearly all of Gaul. While their military was just as strong as the Romans', the internal division between the Gallic tribes guaranteed an easy victory for Caesar, and Vercingetorix's attempt to unite the Gauls against Roman invasion came too late. Caesar was checked by Vercingetorix at a siege of Gergovia, a fortified town in the center of Gaul. Caesar's alliances with many Gallic tribes broke. Even the Aedui, their most faithful supporters, threw in their lot with the Arverni but the ever-loyal Remi (best known for its cavalry) and Lingones sent troops to support Caesar. The Germani of the Ubii also sent cavalry, which Caesar equipped with Remi horses. Caesar captured Vercingetorix in September 52 BC in the Battle of Alesia, which ended the majority of Gallic resistance to Rome.

As many as one million people (probably 1 in 12 of the Gauls) died, another one million were enslaved, 300 clans were subjugated and 800 cities were destroyed during the Gallic Wars. The entire population of the city of Avaricum (Bourges) (40,000 in all) were slaughtered. Before Caesar's campaign against the Helvetii (Switzerland), the Helvetians had numbered 263,000, but afterwards only 100,000 remained, most of whom Caesar took as slaves.

=== Roman Gaul ===
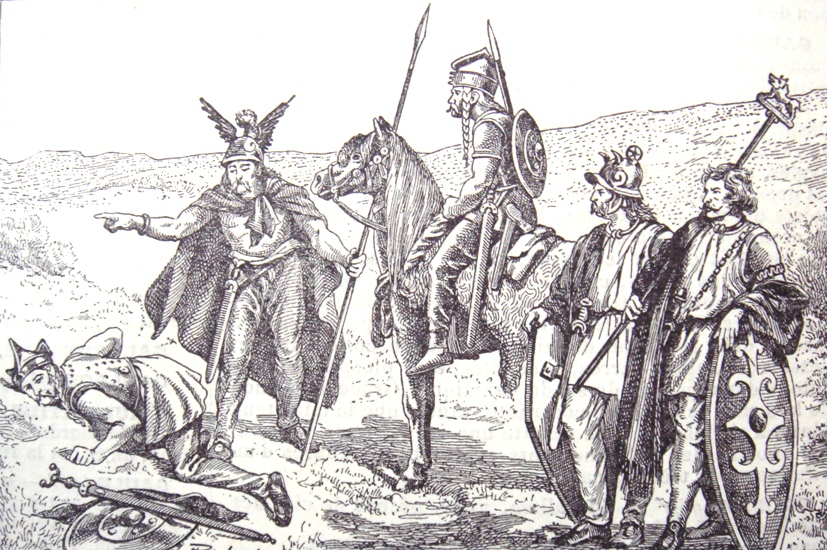
Soldiers of Gaul, as imagined by a late 19th-century illustrator for the Larousse dictionary, 1898

After Gaul was absorbed as Gallia, a set of Roman provinces, its inhabitants gradually adopted aspects of Roman culture and assimilated, resulting in the distinct Gallo-Roman culture. Citizenship was granted to all in 212 AD by the Constitutio Antoniniana. From the 3rd to 5th centuries, Gaul was exposed to raids by the Franks. The Gallic Empire—consisting of the provinces of Gaul, Britannia, and Hispania, including the peaceful Baetica in the south—broke away from Rome from 260 to 273. In addition to the large number of natives, Gallia also became home to some Roman citizens from elsewhere and also immigration of Germanic and Scythian tribes such as the Alans.

The religious practices of inhabitants became a combination of Roman and Celtic practice, with Celtic deities such as Cobannus and Epona subjected to interpretatio romana. The imperial cult and Eastern mystery religions also gained a following. Eventually, after it became the official religion of the empire, and paganism became suppressed, Christianity won out in the twilight days of the Western Roman Empire. A small but notable Jewish presence also became established.

The Gaulish language is thought to have survived into the 6th century in France, despite considerable Romanization of the local material culture. The last record of spoken Gaulish deemed to be plausibly credible concerned the destruction by Christians of a pagan shrine in Auvergne "called Vasso Galatae in the Gallic tongue". Coexisting with Latin, Gaulish helped shape the Vulgar Latin dialects that developed into French. The Vulgar Latin in the region of Gallia took on a distinctly local character, some of which is attested in graffiti, which evolved into the Gallo-Romance dialects which include French and its closest relatives. The influence of substrate languages may be seen in graffiti showing sound changes that matched changes that had earlier occurred in the indigenous languages, especially Gaulish. The Vulgar Latin in the north of Gaul evolved into the langues d'oïl and Franco-Provencal, while the dialects in the south evolved into the modern Occitan and Catalan tongues. Other languages held to be "Gallo-Romance" include the Gallo-Italic languages and the Rhaeto-Romance languages.

=== Frankish Gaul ===
Following Frankish victories in the Franco-Roman War (486) and the Franco–Gothic War (507) and Autun (532), Gaul (except for Brittany and Septimania) came under the rule of the Merovingians, the first kings of France. Gallo-Roman culture persisted particularly in the areas of Gallia Narbonensis that developed into Occitania, Gallia Cisalpina and to a lesser degree, Aquitania. The north developed into Merovingian culture. Roman life, centered on the public events and cultural responsibilities of urban life in the res publica and the sometimes luxurious life of the self-sufficient rural villa system, took longer to collapse in the Gallo-Roman regions, where the Visigoths largely inherited the status quo in the early 5th century. Gallo-Roman language persisted in the northeast into the Silva Carbonaria that formed an effective cultural barrier, with the Franks to the north and east, and in the northwest to the lower valley of the Loire. Gallo-Roman culture interfaced with Frankish culture in urban areas like Tours.

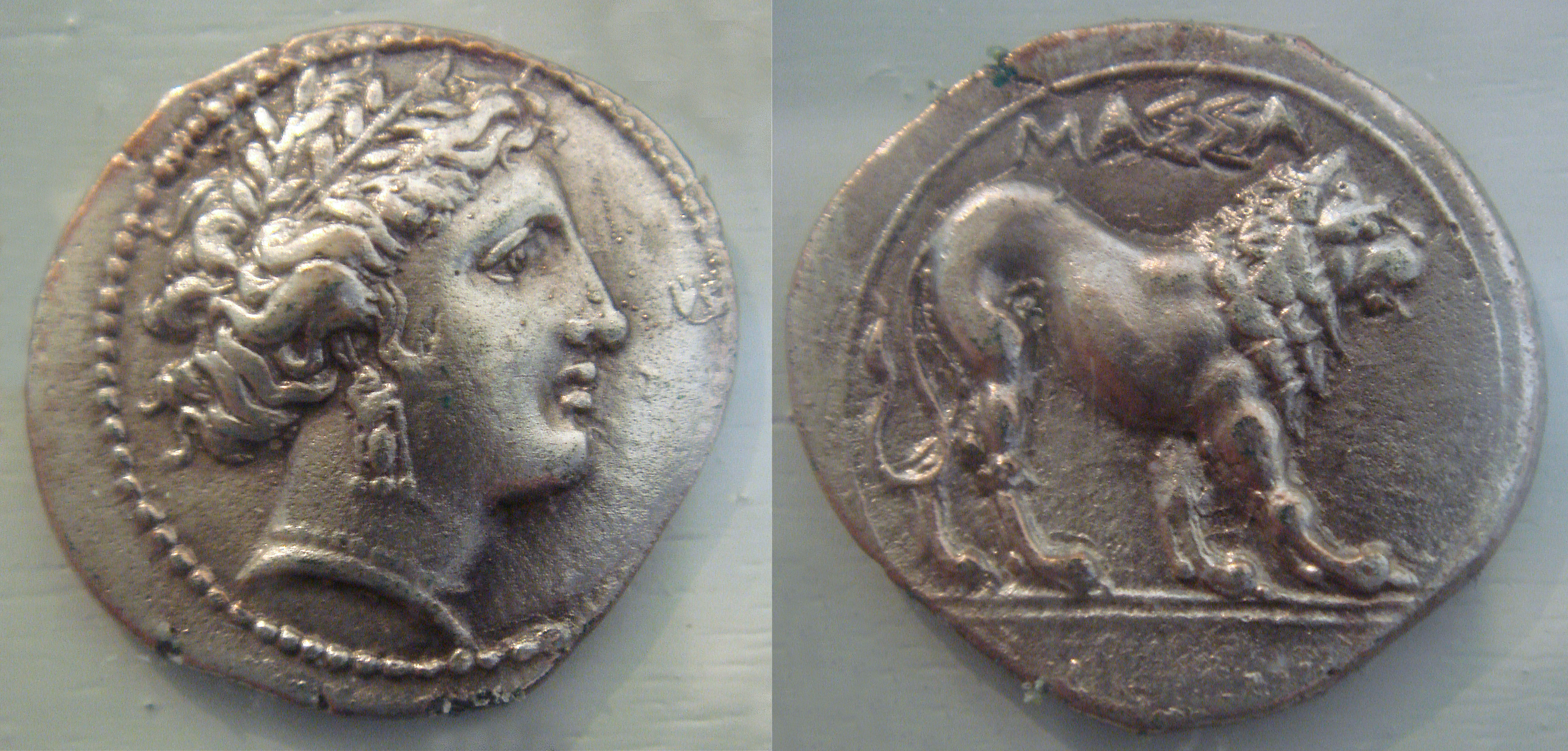
Massalia (Marseille) silver coin with Greek legend, 5th–1st century BC.

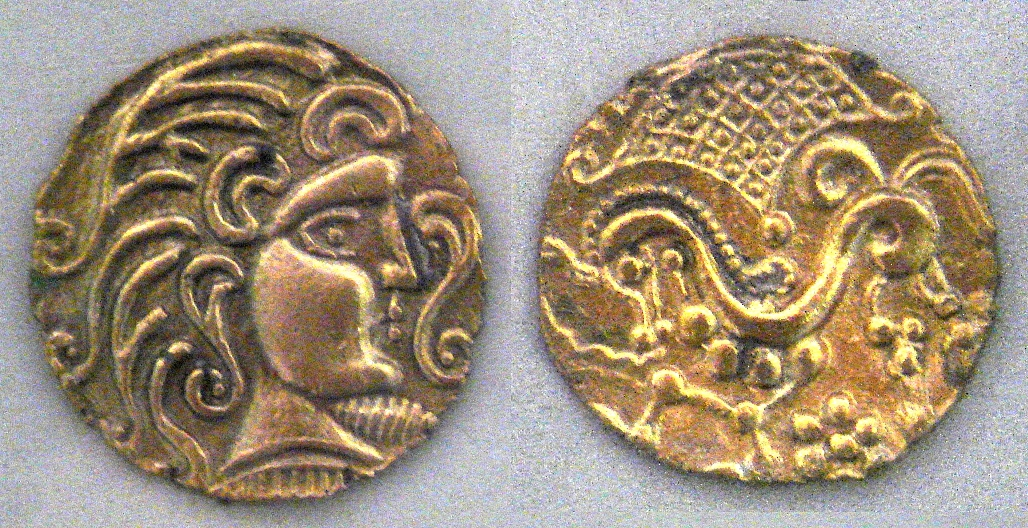
Gold coins of the Gaul Parisii, 1st century BC, (Cabinet des Médailles, Paris).

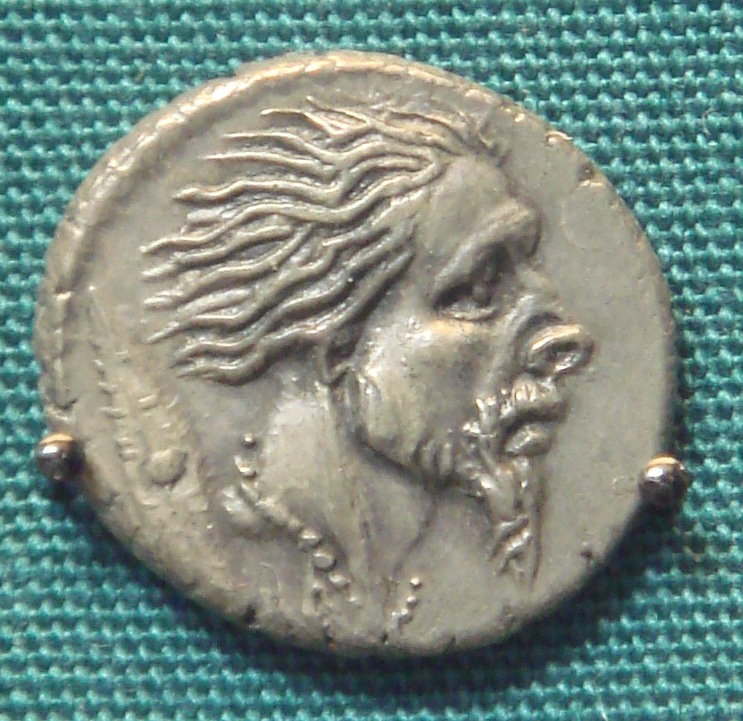
Roman silver Denarius with the head of captive Gaul 48 BC, following the campaigns of Julius Caesar.

== Culture ==
=== Social structure, indigenous nation and tribes ===
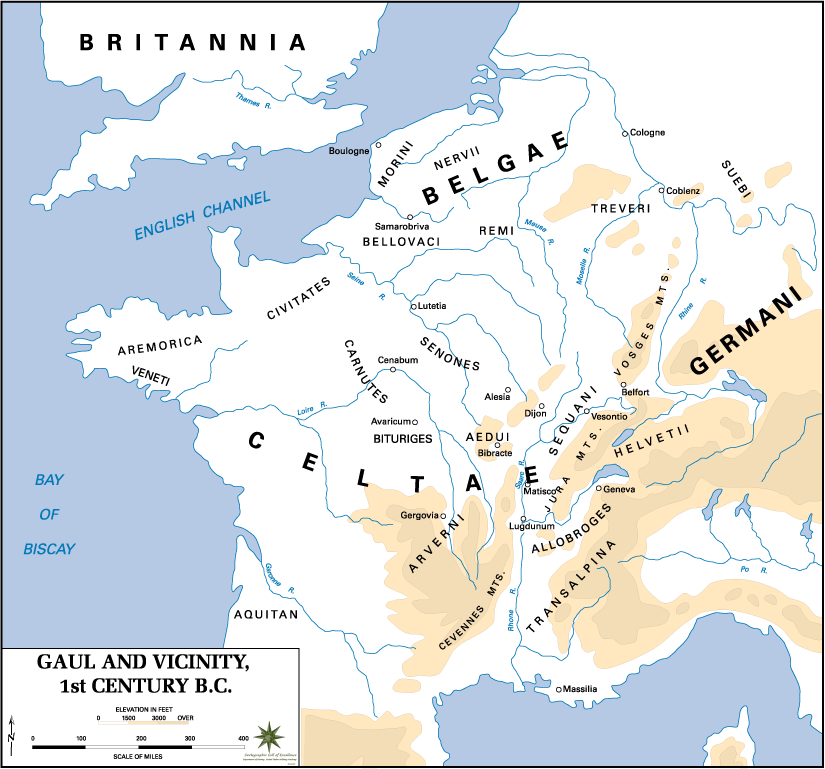
A map of Gaul in the 1st century BC, showing the relative positions of the Celtae, the Belgae, and the Aquitani.

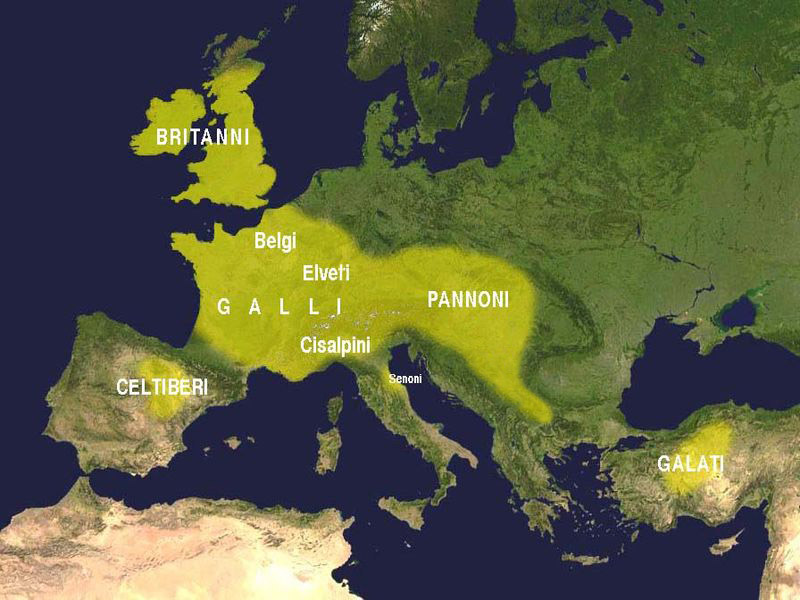
Expansion of the Celtic culture in the 3rd century BC.

The fundamental unit of Gallic politics was the tribe or civitas, which consisted of one or more of what Caesar called pagi. Each tribe had a council of elders and initially a king. Later, the executive was an annually-elected magistrate. Among the Aedui, a tribe of Gaul, the executive held the title of Vergobret, a position much like a king, but his powers were held in check by rules laid down by the council.

The regional ethnic groups, or pagi as the Romans called them (singular: pagus; the French word pays, "region" [a more accurate translation is 'country'], comes from this term), were organized into larger multi-tribe groups, which the Romans called civitates. These administrative groupings would be taken over by the Romans in their system of local control, and these civitates would also be the basis of France's eventual division into ecclesiastical bishoprics and dioceses, which would remain in place—with slight changes—until the French Revolution.

Although the tribes were moderately stable political entities, Gaul as a whole tended to be politically divided, there being virtually no unity among the various tribes. Only during particularly trying times, such as the invasion of Caesar, could the Gauls unite under a single leader like Vercingetorix. Even then, however, the faction lines were clear.

The Romans divided Gaul broadly into Provincia (the conquered area around the Mediterranean), and the northern Gallia Comata ("free Gaul" or "long-haired Gaul"). Caesar divided the people of Gallia Comata into three broad groups: the Aquitani; Galli (who in their own language were called Celtae); and Belgae. In the modern sense, Gaulish peoples are defined linguistically, as speakers of dialects of the Gaulish language. While the Aquitani were probably Vascons, the Belgae would thus probably be a mixture of Celtic and Germanic elements.

Julius Caesar wrote in The Gallic Wars:

All Gaul is divided into three parts, one of which the Belgae inhabit, the Aquitani another, those who in their own language are called Celts, in our Gauls, the third. All these differ from each other in language, customs and laws. The river Garonne separates the Gauls from the Aquitani; the Marne and the Seine separate them from the Belgae. Of all these, the Belgae are the bravest, because they are furthest from the civilization and refinement of [our] Province, and merchants least frequently resort to them, and import those things which tend to effeminate the mind; and they are the nearest to the Germans, who dwell beyond the Rhine, with whom they are continually waging war; for which reason the Helvetii also surpass the rest of the Gauls in valor, as they contend with the Germans in almost daily battles, when they either repel them from their own territories, or themselves wage war on their frontiers. One part of these, which it has been said that the Gauls occupy, takes its beginning at the river Rhone; it is bounded by the river Garonne, the ocean, and the territories of the Belgae; it borders, too, on the side of the Sequani and the Helvetii, upon the river Rhine, and stretches toward the north. The Belgae rises from the extreme frontier of Gaul, extend to the lower part of the river Rhine; and look toward the north and the rising sun. Aquitania extends from the river Garonne to the Pyrenaean mountains and to that part of the ocean which is near Spain: it looks between the setting of the sun, and the north star.

=== Religion ===
The Gauls practiced a form of animism, ascribing human characteristics to lakes, streams, mountains, and other natural features and granting them a quasi-divine status. Also, worship of animals was not uncommon; the animal most sacred to the Gauls was the boar which can be found on many Gallic military standards, much like the Roman eagle. Their system of gods and goddesses was loose, there being certain deities which virtually every Gallic person worshipped, as well as tribal and household gods.

Perhaps the most intriguing facet of Gallic religion is the practice of the druids. The druids presided over human or animal sacrifices that were made in wooded groves or crude temples. They also appear to have held the responsibility for preserving the annual agricultural calendar and instigating seasonal festivals which corresponded to key points of the lunar-solar calendar. The religious practices of druids were syncretic and borrowed from earlier pagan traditions, with probably Indo-European roots. Caesar mentions in The Gallic Wars that those Celts who wanted to make a close study of druidism went to Britain to do so. In a little over a century later, Gnaeus Julius Agricola mentions Roman armies attacking a large druid sanctuary in Anglesey in Wales.

There is no certainty concerning the origin of the druids, but it is clear that they guarded the secrets of their order and held sway over the people of Gaul. Indeed, they claimed the right to determine questions of war and peace and thereby held an "international" status. In addition, the druids monitored the religion of ordinary Gauls and were in charge of educating the aristocracy. They also practiced a form of excommunication from the assembly of worshippers, which in ancient Gaul meant a separation from secular society as well. Thus the druids were an important part of Gallic society. The nearly complete and mysterious disappearance of the Celtic language from most of the territorial lands of ancient Gaul, with the exception of Brittany, can be attributed to the fact that Celtic druids refused to allow the Celtic oral literature or traditional wisdom to be committed to the written letter.

== See also ==
- Ambiorix
- Asterix – a French comic about Gaul and Rome, mainly set in 50 BC
- Bog body
- Braccae – trousers, typical Gallic dress
- Cisalpine Gaul
- Galatia
- Lugdunum
- Roman Republic
- Roman villas in northwestern Gaul
- Urban Enclosures in Roman Gaul

== Sources ==
- Birkhan, H. (1997). Die Kelten. Vienna.
- Drinkwater, John Frederick (2014) [1983]. "Conquest and Pacification". Roman Gaul: The Three Provinces, 58 BC–AD 260. Routledge Revivals. Abingdon: Routledge. ISBN 978-1317750741.
- Koch, John Thomas (2006). Celtic culture: a historical encyclopedia. ABC-CLIO. ISBN 1-85109-440-7.
- Ñaco del Hoyo, Toni; Principal, Jordi; Dobson, Mike, eds. (2022). Rome and the north-western Mediterranean : integration and connectivity c. 150–70 BC. Oxford: Oxbow Books. ISBN 9781789257175.
