= Phoenician history =

Phoenicia was an ancient Semitic-speaking thalassocratic civilization that originated in the Levant region of the eastern Mediterranean, primarily modern Lebanon. At its height between 1100 and 200 BC, Phoenician civilization spread across the Mediterranean, from Cyprus to the Iberian Peninsula, and Africa (Canary Islands).

The Phoenicians came to prominence following the collapse of most major cultures during the Late Bronze Age. They developed an expansive maritime trade network that lasted over a millennium, becoming the dominant commercial power for much of classical antiquity. Phoenician trade also helped facilitate the exchange of cultures, ideas, and knowledge between major cradles of civilization such as Greece, Egypt, and Mesopotamia. After its zenith in the 9th century BC, Phoenician civilization in the eastern Mediterranean slowly declined in the face of foreign influence and conquest, though its presence would remain in the central and western Mediterranean until the second century BC.

Phoenician civilization was organized in city-states, similar to those of ancient Greece, of which the most notable were Tyre, Sidon, and Byblos. Each city-state was politically independent, and there is no evidence the Phoenicians viewed themselves as a single nationality. Carthage, a Phoenician settlement in northwest Africa, became a major civilization in its own right in the 7th century BC.

Since little has survived of Phoenician records or literature, most of what is known about their origins and history comes from the accounts of other civilizations and inferences from their material culture excavated throughout the Mediterranean Sea. Little was written about the Phoenicians in the early modern period, until the 1646 publication of Samuel Bochart's Geographia Sacra seu Phaleg et Canaan, the first full-length book devoted to the subject. It created a framework narrative for future scholars of a maritime-based trading society with linguistic and philological influence across the region. However, early scholars like Bochart presented the Phoenicians as merchants and colonists from the same region, rather than a fully-fledged ethnocultural group. Knowledge of the Phoenicians at this time was confined to the ancient Greco-Roman sources.

Scholarly interest increased in 1758, when Jean-Jacques Barthélémy deciphered the Phoenician alphabet, and the number of known Phoenician inscriptions began to increase – the 1694 publication of the Cippi of Melqart was the first Phoenician inscription to be identified and published in modern times. In 1837, Wilhelm Gesenius published the first full compendium of the Phoenician language (Scripturae Linguaeque Phoeniciae Monumenta), after which Franz Karl Movers published Die Phönizier (1841–1850) and Phönizische Texte, erklärt (1845–1847), collecting the classical and biblical sources, in which he presented the Phoenician “people” (Völkerschaft) as an ethnic group. Further 19th century scholarly works included: John Kenrick’s Phoenicia (1855), George Rawlinson's History of Phoenicia (1889) and Richard Pietschmann's Geschichte der Phönizier (also 1889). This scholarly study of the Phoenicians was first consolidated by Ernest Renan, first with his French-government-sponsored Mission de Phénicie – considered a smaller-scale follow up to the Napoleonic era Description de l'Égypte – and then with the Corpus Inscriptionum Semiticarum.

The scholarly consensus is that the Phoenicians' period of greatest prominence was 1200 BC to the end of the Persian period (332 BC). The Phoenician Early Bronze Age is largely unknown. The two most important sites are Byblos and Sidon-Dakerman (near Sidon), although, as of 2021, well over a hundred sites remain to be excavated, while others that have been are yet to be fully analysed. The Middle Bronze Age was a generally peaceful time of increasing population, trade, and prosperity, though there was competition for natural resources. In the Late Bronze Age, rivalry between Egypt, the Mittani, the Hittites, and Assyria had a significant impact on Phoenicians cities.

== Origins ==
Herodotus believed that the Phoenicians originated from Bahrain, a view shared centuries later by the historian Strabo. This theory was accepted by the 19th-century German classicist Arnold Heeren, who noted that Greek geographers described "two islands, named Tyrus or Tylos, and Aradus, which boasted that they were the mother country of the Phoenicians, and exhibited relics of Phoenician temples." The people of modern Tyre in Lebanon, have particularly long maintained Persian Gulf origins, and the similarity in the words "Tylos" and "Tyre" has been commented upon. The Dilmun civilization thrived in Bahrain during the period 2200–1600 BC, as shown by excavations of settlements and the Dilmun burial mounds. However, some scholars note that there is little evidence Bahrain was occupied during the time when such migration had supposedly taken place. Genetic research from 2017 showed that "present-day Lebanese derive most of their ancestry from a Canaanite-related population, which therefore implies substantial genetic continuity in the Levant since at least the Bronze Age" based on ancient DNA samples from skeletons found in modern-day Lebanon. However, this study did not look at Arabian genetic history, and an even more recent study highlighted the high relatedness of Arabians with coastal Levantines, showing that Arabian hunter-gatherers derive most of their ancestry from Neolithic Levantines, and that modern inhabitants of the UAE derive a greater amount of their ancestry from Neolithic Levantines than do modern Levantines. While modern Lebanese derive over 90% of their ancestry from Bronze Age Sidonians, Emiratis derive 75% of their DNA from Bronze Age Sidon in Lebanon and 25% from Arabian hunter-gatherers who were highly related to the Natufians, or Neolithic Levantines. Therefore any back-migration of Arabians to the Levant is difficult, if not impossible, to distinguish genetically. According to Sextus Julius Africanus, some Phoenicians claimed that their history stretched back some 30,000 years.

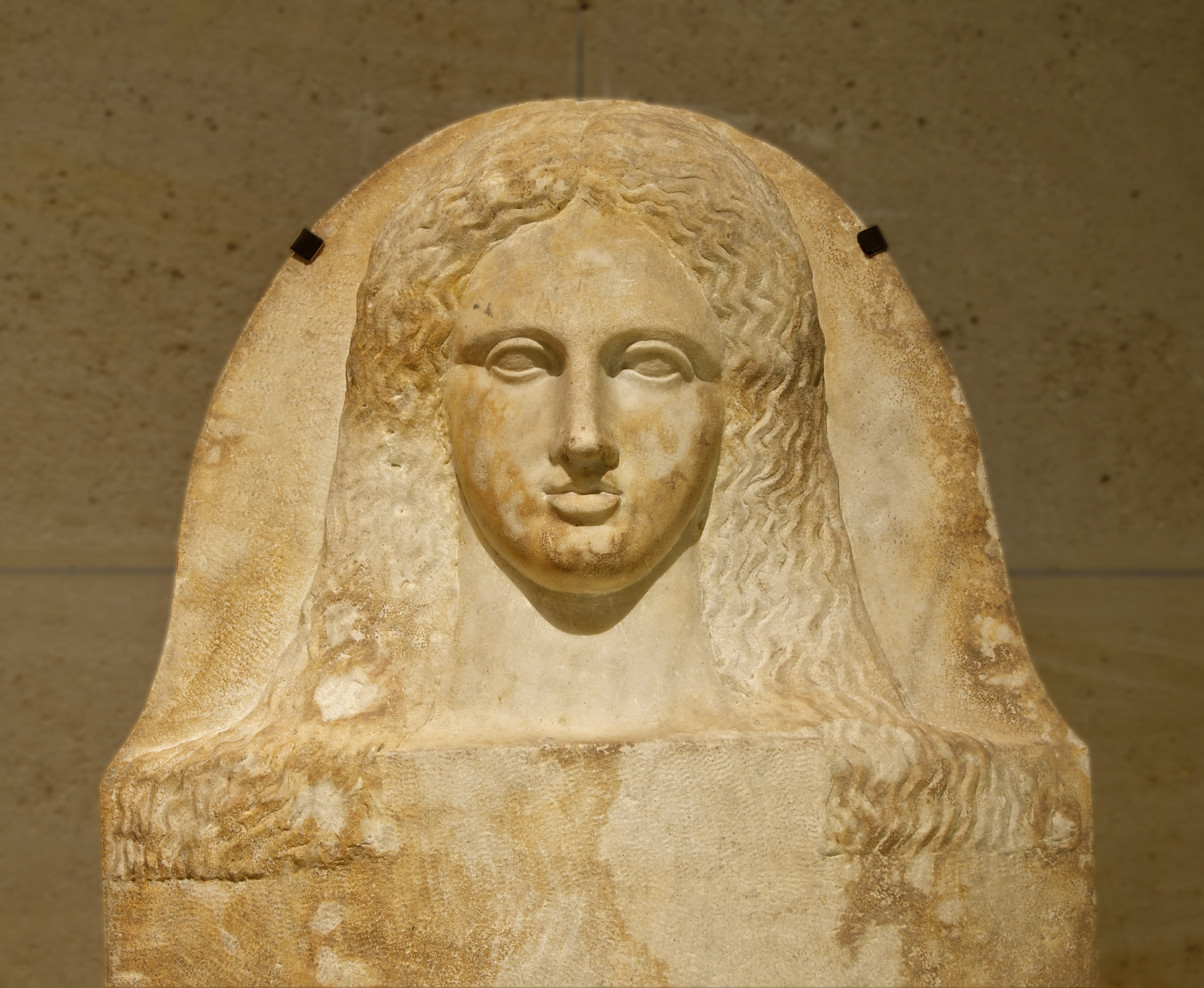
Cover of a Phoenician anthropoid sarcophagus of a woman, made of marble, 350–325 BC, from Sidon, now in the Louvre

Certain scholars suggest there is enough evidence for a Semitic dispersal to the fertile crescent circa 2500 BC. By contrast, other scholars, such as Sabatino Moscati, believe the Phoenicians originated from an admixture of previous non-Semitic inhabitants with the Semitic arrivals. However, in reality, the ethnogenesis of the Canaanites, and more specifically, Phoenicians, is much more complex. The Canaanite culture that gave rise to the Phoenicians apparently developed in situ from the earlier Ghassulian chalcolithic culture. Ghassulian itself developed from the Circum-Arabian Nomadic Pastoral Complex, which in turn developed from a fusion of their ancestral Natufian and Harifian cultures with Pre-Pottery Neolithic B (PPNB) farming cultures, practicing the domestication of animals during the 6200 BC climatic crisis, which led to the Neolithic Revolution in the Levant. Byblos is attested as an archaeological site from the Early Bronze Age. The Late Bronze Age state of Ugarit is considered quintessentially Canaanite archaeologically, even though the Ugaritic language does not belong to the Canaanite languages proper.

== Emergence during the Late Bronze Age (1550–1200 BC) ==
In the early 16th century BC, Egypt ejected foreign rulers known as the Hyksos, a diverse group of peoples from the Near East, and re-established native dynastic rule under the New Kingdom. This precipitated Egypt's incursion into the Levant, with a particular focus on Phoenicia; the first known account of the Phoenicians relates to the conquests of Thutmose III (1479–1425 BC). Coastal cities such as Byblos, Arwad, and Ullasa were targeted for their crucial geographic and commercial links with the interior (via the Nahr al-Kabir and the Orontes rivers). The cities provided Egypt with access to Mesopotamian trade as well as abundant stocks of the region's native cedar wood, of which there was no equivalent in the Egyptian homeland. Thutmose III reports stocking Phoenician harbors with timber for annual shipments, as well as constructing ships for inland trade through the Euphrates River.

According to the Amarna Letters, a series of correspondences between Egypt and Phoenicia from 1411 to 1358 BC, by the mid 14th century, most of Phoenicia, along with parts of the Levant, came under a "loosely defined" Egyptian administrative framework. The Phoenician city states were considered "favored cities" to the Egyptians, helping anchor Egypt's access to resources and trade. Tyre, Sidon, Beirut, and Byblos were regarded as the most important. Though nominally under Egyptian rule, the Phoenicians had considerable autonomy and their cities were fairly well developed and prosperous. They are described as having their own established dynasties, political assemblies, and merchant fleets, even engaging in political and commercial competition amongst themselves. Byblos was evidently the leading city outside Egypt proper, accounting for most of the Amarna communications. It was a major center of bronze-making, and the primary terminus of precious goods such as tin and lapis lazuli from as far east as Afghanistan. Sidon and Tyre also commanded interest among Egyptian officials, beginning a pattern of rivalry that would span the next millennium.

The economic dynamism of Egypt's Eighteenth Dynasty, particularly under its ninth pharaoh, Amenhotep III (1391–1353 BC), brought further prosperity and prominence to the Phoenician cities. There was growing demand for a wide array of goods, though timber remained the principal commodity: Egypt's expanding shipbuilding industry and rapid construction of temples and estates were a driving force of the economy; cedar was the wood of choice for the coffins of the priestly and upper class. Initially dominated by Byblos, virtually every city had access to a variety of hardwood, with the notable exception of Tyre. Every city saw an influx of wealth and a more diversified economy that included loggers, artisans, traders, and sailors.

=== Hittite intervention and Late Bronze Age collapse ===
The Amarna letters report that from 1350 to 1300 BC, neighboring Amorites and Hittites were capturing Phoenician cities, especially in the north. Egypt subsequently lost its coastal holdings from Ugarit in northern Syria to Byblos near central Lebanon. The southern Phoenician cities appeared to have remained autonomous, though under Seti I (1306–1290 BC) Egypt reaffirmed its control.

Some time between 1200 and 1150 BC, the Late Bronze Age collapse severely weakened or destroyed most civilizations in the region, including the Egyptians and Hittites.

== Ascendance and high point (1200–800 BC) ==
Sometime between 1200 and 1150 BC, the Late Bronze Age collapse severely weakened or destroyed most civilizations in the region, including the Egyptians and Hittites. The Phoenicians were able to survive and navigate the challenges of the crisis, and by 1230 BC city-states such as Tyre, Sidon, and Byblos, maintained political independence, asserted their maritime interests through overseas colonization, and enjoyed economic prosperity. The period is sometimes described as a "Phoenician renaissance". The Phoenician city-states filled the power vacuum caused by the Late Bronze Age collapse and created a vast mercantile network. The city-states during this time were Tyre, Sidon, Byblos, Aradus, Beirut, and Tripoli.

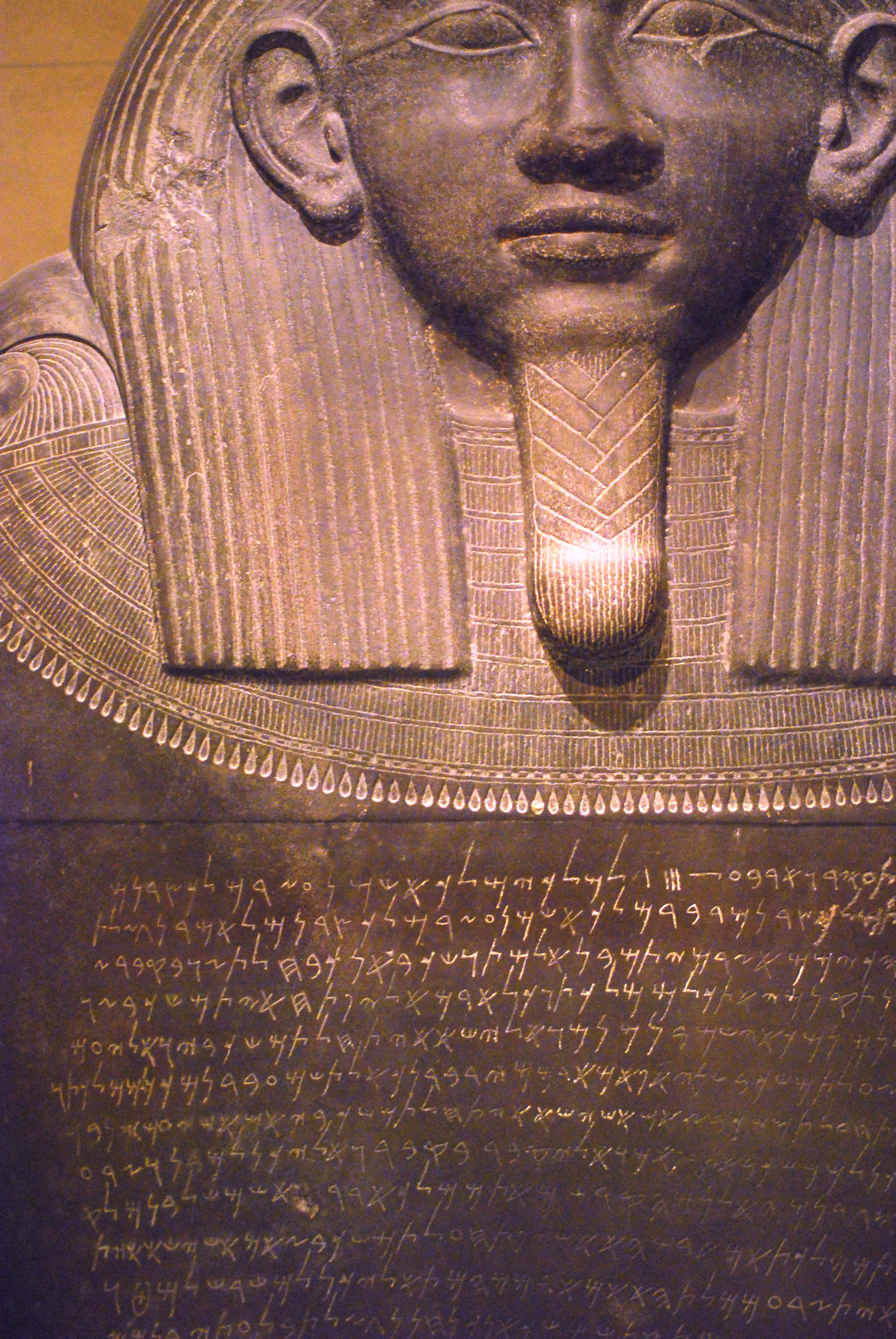
Sarcophagus of Eshmunazor II, Phoenician king of Sidon (5th century BC), bearing notable Egyptian influence.

Byblos and Sidon were the earliest powers, though the relative prominence of Phoenician city states would ebb and flow throughout the millennium. Other major cities were Tyre, Simyra, Arwad, and Berytus, all of which appeared in the Amarna tablets of the mid-second millennium BC. Byblos was initially the main point from which the Phoenicians dominated the Mediterranean and Red Sea routes. It was here that the first inscription in the Phoenician alphabet was found, on the sarcophagus of King Ahiram (c. 850 BC). Phoenicia's independent coastal cities were ideally suited for trade between the Levant area, which was rich in natural resources, and the rest of the ancient world.

Early into the Iron Age, the Phoenicians established ports, warehouses, markets, and settlement all across the Mediterranean and up to the southern Black Sea. Initially led by Tyre, colonies were established on Cyprus, Sardinia, the Balearic Islands, Sicily, and Malta, as well as the fertile coasts of North Africa and the mineral rich Iberian Peninsula. Some scholars believe Carthage, which would later emerge as a major power in the western Mediterranean, was founded during the reign of Pygmalion of Tyre (831–735 BC). The Phoenician's complex mercantile network supported what Fernand Braudel calls an early example of a "world-economy", described as "an economically autonomous section of the planet able to provide for most of its own needs" due to links and exchanges provided by the Phoenicians.

A unique concentration in Phoenicia of silver hoards dated some time during its high point contains hacksilver (used for currency) that bears lead isotope ratios matching ores in Sardinia and Spain. This metallic evidence indicates the extent of Phoenician trade networks. It also seems to confirm the Biblical attestation of a western Mediterranean port city, Tarshish, supplying King Solomon of Israel with silver via Phoenicia.

In Tartessos region of southern Spain, the Tartessian culture was born around the 9th century B.C. as a result of hybridization between the Phoenician settlers and the local inhabitants.

The first textual account of the Phoenicians during the Iron Age comes from Assyrian King Tiglath-Pileser I, who recorded his campaign against the Phoenicians between 1114 and 1076 BC. Seeking access to the Phoenician's high quality cedar wood, he describes exacting tribute from the leading cities at the time, Byblos and Sidon. Roughly a year later, the Egyptian priest, Wenamun describes his efforts to procure cedar wood for a religious temple from 1075 to 1060 BC. (Note: Sometimes rendered "Wen-Amon") Contradicting the account of Tiglath-Pileser I, Wenamun describes Byblos and Sidon as impressive and powerful coastal cities, which suggests that the Assyrian siege was ineffectual. Although once vassals of the Egyptians during the Bronze Age, the city states were now able to reject Wenamun's demand for tribute, instead forcing the Egyptians to agree to a commercial arrangement. This indicates the extent to which the Phoenicians had become a more influential and independent people.

For many centuries, Phoenicians and Canaanites alike were alternatively called Sidonians or Tyrians. Throughout much of the 11th century BC, the biblical books of Joshua, Judges, and Samuel use the term Sidonian to describe all Phoenicians; by the 10th century BC, Tyre rose to become the richest and most powerful Phoenician city state, particularly during the reign of Hiram I (c. 969–936 BC). Described in the Jewish Bible as a contemporary of kings David and Solomon of Israel, he is best known for being commissioned to build Solomon's Temple, where the skill and wealth of his city state is noted. Overall, the Old Testament references Phoenician city states—namely Sidon, Tyre, Arvad (Awad) and Byblos—over 100 times, indicating the extent to which Tyrian and Phoenician culture was recognized.

Indeed, the Phoenicians stood out from their contemporaries in that their rise was relatively peaceful. As archaeologist James B. Pritchard notes, "They became the first to provide a link between the culture of the ancient Near East and that of the uncharted world of the West ... They went not for conquest as the Babylonians and Assyrians did, but for trade. Profit rather than plunder was their policy." Pritchard observes that even the Israelites, who were in conflict with virtually every neighboring culture, seemed to regard the Phoenicians as "respected neighbors with whom Israel was able to maintain amicable diplomatic and commercial relations throughout a span of a half millennium ... Yet despite the ideological differences between Israel and her northern neighbors, detente prevailed."

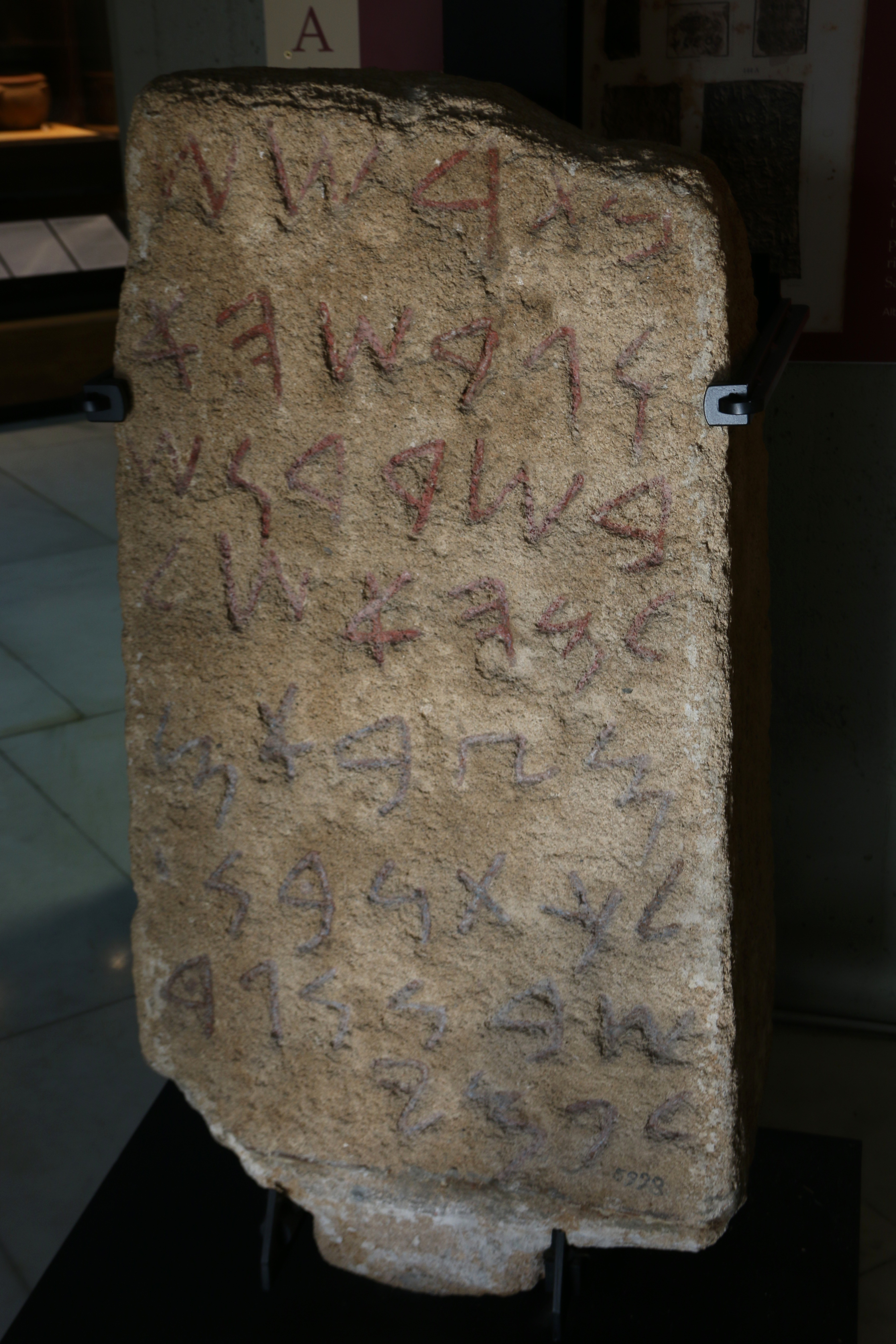
The Nora Stone, found in Sardinia, Italy, in the 18th century, is the most ancient Phoenician inscription ever found outside the Phoenician heartland (c. 8th–9th century BC). It is indicative of the expansive trade network the Phoenicians established in ancient times. (National Archaeological Museum, Cagliari, Italy)

During the rule of the priest Ithobaal (887–856 BC), Tyre expanded its territory as far north as Beirut (incorporating its erstwhile rival Sidon) and into part of Cyprus; this unusual act of aggression was the closest the Phoenicians ever came to forming a unitary territorial state. Tellingly, once his realm reached its greatest territorial extent, Ithobaal declared himself "King of the Sidonians", a title that would be used by his successors and mentioned in both Greek and Jewish accounts.

=== Phoenician alphabet ===
During their high point, specifically around 1050 BC, the Phoenicians developed a script for writing Phoenician, a Northern Semitic language. They were among the first state-level societies to make extensive use of alphabets. The family of Canaanite languages, spoken by Israelites, Phoenicians, Amorites, Ammonites, Moabites and Edomites, was the first historically attested group of languages to use an alphabet to record their writings, based on the Proto-Canaanite script. The Proto-Canaanite script, which is derived from Egyptian hieroglyphs, uses around 30 symbols but was not widely used until the rise of new Semitic kingdoms in the 13th and 12th centuries BC.

The Canaanite-Phoenician alphabet consists of 22 letters, all consonants. It is believed to be one of the ancestors of modern alphabets. Through their maritime trade, the Phoenicians spread the use of the alphabet to Anatolia, North Africa, and Europe, where it likely served the purpose of communication and commercial relations. The alphabet was adopted by the Greeks, who developed it to have distinct letters for vowels as well as consonants.

The name Phoenician is by convention given to inscriptions beginning around 1050 BC, because Phoenician, Hebrew, and other Canaanite dialects were largely indistinguishable before that time. The so-called Ahiram epitaph, engraved on the sarcophagus of King Ahiram from about 1000 BC, shows a fully developed Phoenician script.

== Peak and gradual decline (900–586 BC) ==
The Late Iron Age saw the height of Phoenician shipping, mercantile, and cultural activity, particularly between 750 and 650 BC. Phoenician influence was visible in the "Orientalization" of Greek cultural and artistic conventions through Egyptian and Near Eastern influences transmitted by the Phoenician. The infusion of various technological, scientific, and philosophical ideas from all over the region laid the foundations for the emergence of classical Greece in the 5th century BC.

The Phoenicians, already well known as peerless mariners and traders, had also developed a distinct and complex culture. They learned to manufacture both common and luxury goods, becoming "renowned in antiquity for clever trinkets mass produced for wholesale consumption." They were proficient in glass-making, engraved and chased metalwork (including bronze, iron, and gold), ivory carving, and woodwork. Among their most popular goods were fine textiles, typically dyed with the famed Tyrian purple. Homer's Iliad, which was composed during this period, references the quality of Phoenician clothing and metal goods. Phoenicians also became the leading producers of glass in the region, with thousands of flasks, beads, and other glassware being shipped across the Mediterranean. Colonies in Spain appeared to have utilized the potter's wheel, while Carthage, now a nascent city state, utilized serial production to produce large numbers of ships quickly and cheaply.

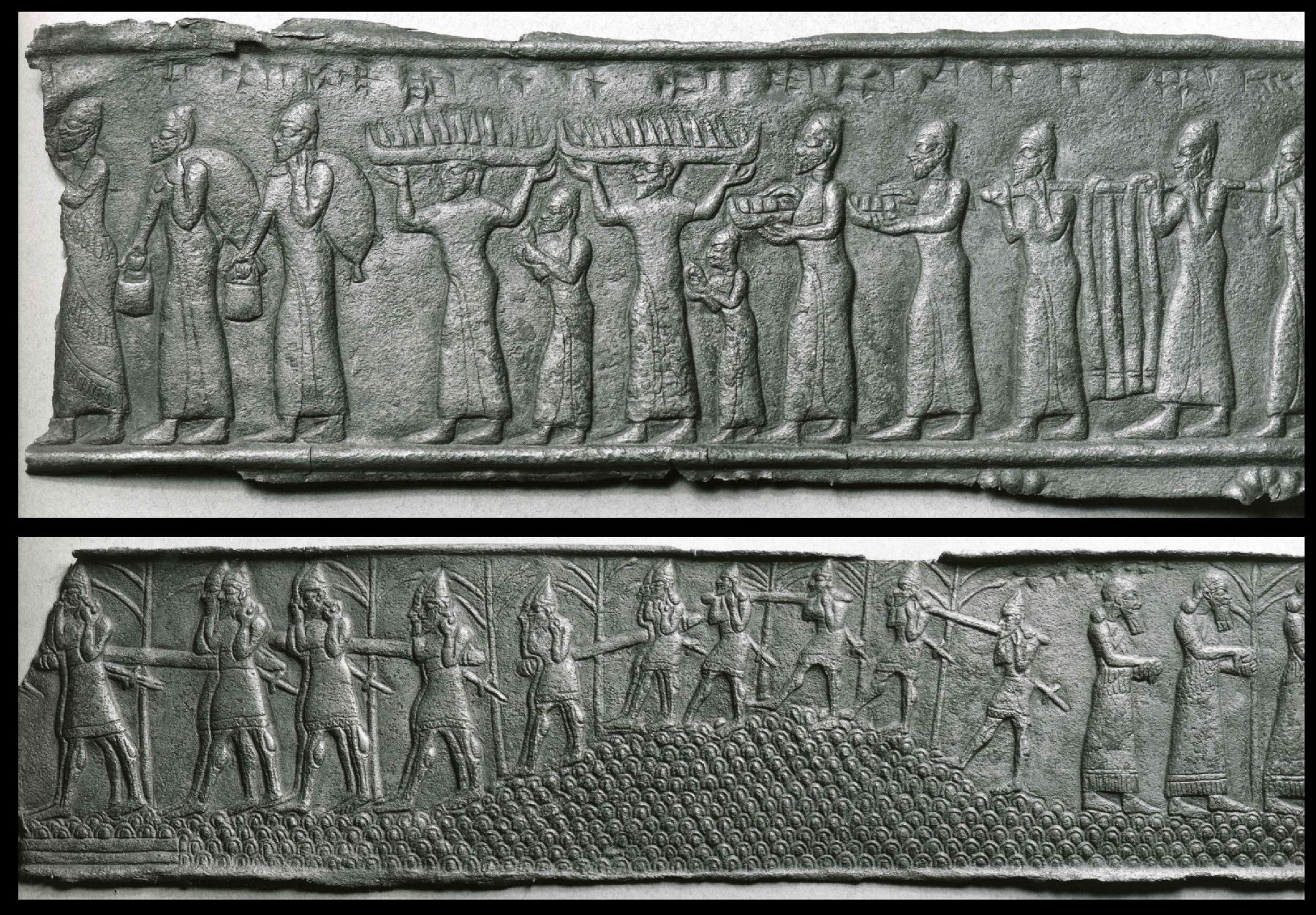
Two bronze fragments from an Assyrian palace gate depicting the collection of tribute from the Phoenician cities of Tyre and Sidon (859–824 BC). British Museum.

=== Vassalage under the Assyrians (858–608 BC) ===
As mercantile city-states concentrated along a narrow coastal strip of land, the Phoenicians lacked the size and population to support a large military. Thus, as neighboring empires began to rise, the Phoenicians increasingly fell under the sway of foreign rulers, who to varying degrees circumscribed their autonomy.

The Assyrian conquest of Phoenicia began with King Shalmaneser III, who rose to power in 858 BC and began a series of campaigns against neighboring states. The Phoenician city states fell under his rule over a period of three years, forced to pay heavy tribute in money, goods, and natural resources. However, the Phoenicians were not annexed outright—they remained in a state of vassalage, subordinate to the Assyrians but allowed a certain degree of freedom. Relative to other conquered peoples in the empire, the Phoenicians were treated well, due to a history of otherwise amicable relations with the Assyrians, and to their importance as a source of income and even diplomacy for the expanding empire.

After the death of Shalmaneser III in 824 BC, the Phoenicians maintained their quasi-independence, as subsequent rulers did not wish to meddle in their internal affairs, lest they deprive their empire of a key source of capital. This changed in 744 BC, with the ascension of Tiglath-Pileser III, who sought to forcefully incorporate surrounding territories rather than keep them subordinate. By 738 BC, most of the Levant, including northern Phoenicia, were annexed and fell directly under Assyrian administration; only Tyre and Byblos, the most powerful of the city states, remained as tributary states outside of direct control.

Within years Tyre and Byblos rebelled. Tiglath-Pileser III quickly subdued both cities and imposed heavier tribute. After several years, Tyre rebelled again, this time allying with its erstwhile rival Sidon. After two to three years, Sargon II (722–705 BC) successfully besieged Tyre in 721 BC and crushed the alliance. In 701 BC, his son and successor Sennacherib suppressed further rebellions across the region, reportedly deporting most of Tyre's population to the Assyrian capital of Nineveh. During the 7th century BC, Sidon rebelled and was completely destroyed by Esarhaddon (681–668 BC), who enslaved its inhabitants and built a new city on its ruins.

While the Phoenicians endured unprecedented repression and conflict, by the end of the 7th century BC., the Assyrians had been weakened by successive revolts throughout their empire, which made led to their destruction by the Iranian Median Empire.

=== Babylonian rule (605–538 BC) ===
The Babylonians, formerly vassals of the Assyrians, took advantage of the empire's collapse and rebelled, quickly establishing the Neo-Babylonian Empire in its place. The decisive battle of Carchemish in northern Syria ended the historic hegemony of the Assyrians and their Egyptian allies over the Near East. While Babylonian rule over Phoenicia was brief, it hastened the precipitous decline that began under the Assyrians. Phoenician cities revolted several times throughout the reigns of the first Babylonian king, Nabopolassar (626–605 BC), and his son Nebuchadnezzar II (c. 605 – c. 562 BC). The latter's tenure witnessed several regional rebellions, especially in the Levant. After suppressing a revolt in Jerusalem, Nebuchadnezzar besieged the rebellious Tyre, which resisted for thirteen years from 587 to 574 BC. The city ultimately capitulated under "favorable terms".

During the Babylonian period, Tyre briefly became "a republic headed by elective magistrates", adopting a system of government consisting of a pair of judges, known as sufetes, who were chosen from the most powerful noble families and served short terms.

== Persian period (539–332 BC) ==
The conquests of the late Iron Age left the Phoenicians politically and economically weakened, with city states gradually losing their influence and autonomy in the face of growing foreign powers. Nevertheless, during most of the three centuries of vassalage and domination by Mesopotamian powers the Phoenicians generally managed to remain relatively independent and prosperous. Even when conquered, many of the city states continued to flourish, leveraging their role as intermediaries, shipbuilders, and traders for one foreign suzerain or another. This pattern would continue through the roughly two centuries of Persian rule.

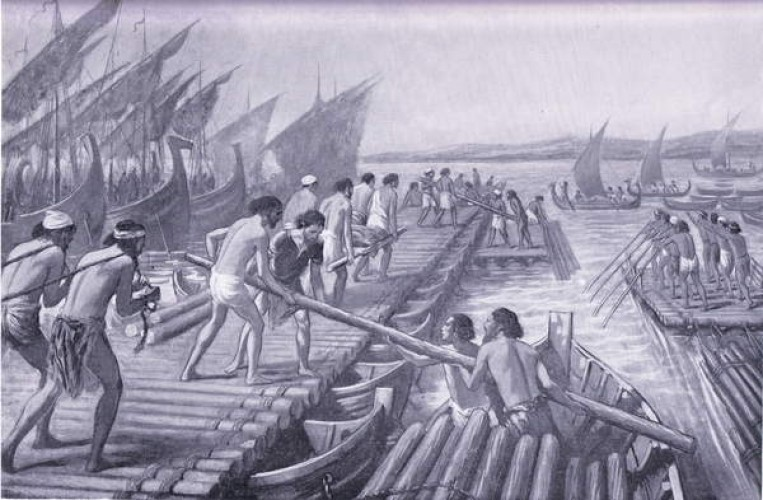
Phoenicians constructing Pontoon Bridges for Xerxes I of Persia during the second Persian invasion of Greece in 480 BC.

In 539 BC, Cyrus the Great, king and founder of the Persian Achaemenid Empire, had exploited the unraveling of the Neo-Babylonian Empire and took the capital of Babylon. As Cyrus began consolidating territories across the Near East, the Phoenicians apparently made the pragmatic calculation of "[yielding] themselves to the Persians." Most of the Levant was consolidated by Cyrus into a single satrapy (province) and forced to pay a yearly tribute of 350 talents, which was roughly half the tribute that was required of Egypt and Libya. This continued the trend, which began under the Assyrians, of the Phoenicians being treated with a relatively lighter hand by most rulers.

In fact, the area of Phoenicia was later divided into four vassal kingdoms—Sidon, Tyre, Arwad, and Byblos—which were allowed considerable autonomy. Unlike in other areas of the empire, including adjacent Jerusalem and Samaria, there is no record of Persian administrators governing the Phoenician city-states. Local Phoenician kings were allowed to remain in power and even given the same rights as Persian satraps (governors), such as hereditary offices and minting their own coins. The otherwise decentralized nature of Persian administration meant the Phoenicians, though no longer an independent and influential power, could at least continue to conduct their political and mercantile affairs with relative freedom.

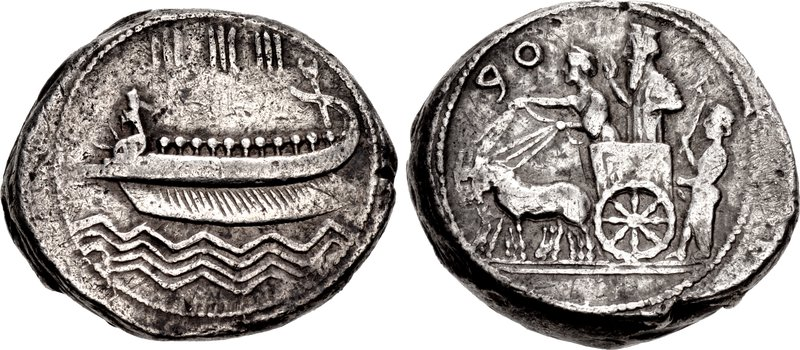
Coin of Abdashtart I of Sidon during the Achaemenid period. He is depicted behind the Persian king on the chariot.

Nevertheless, during the Persian era, many Phoenicians left to settle elsewhere in the Mediterranean, particularly farther west; Carthage was a popular destination, as by this point it was an established and prosperous empire spanning northwest Africa, Iberia, and parts of Italy. Indeed, the Phoenicians continued to show solidarity to their former colony-turned-empire, with Tyre going so far as to defy the order of King Cambyses II to sail against them, which Herodotus claims prevented the Persians from capturing Carthage. The Tyrians and Phoenicians escaped punishment because they had peacefully acceded to Persian rule years earlier and were relied upon for sustaining Persian naval power. Nonetheless, Tyre subsequently lost its privileged status to its principal rival, Sidon. The Phoenicians remained a core asset to the Achaemenid Empire, particularly for their prowess in shipbuilding, navigation, and maritime technology and skill—all of which the Persians lacked as a predominately land-based power. Archaeologist H. Jacob Katzenstein describes the Persian empire as a "blessing" to the Phoenicians, whose cities flourished due to their strategic and economic importance. He continues:

The Phoenician towns became a strong factor in the development of Persian policy because of their fleets and their great maritime knowledge and experience, on which the Persian navy depended. The Persian king recognized this influential position, and the Persians regarded the Phoenicians more as allies than subjects. Arvad, Sidon, and Tyre were given large tracts of land and allowed to trade both on the Phoenician and Palestinian coast.

Consequently, the Phoenicians appeared to have been consenting members of the Persian imperial project. For example, they willingly furnished the bulk of the Persian fleet during the Greco-Persian Wars of the late 5th century BC. Herodotus considers them "the best sailors" among Persian forces. Phoenicians under Xerxes I were equally commended for their ingenuity in building the Xerxes Canal and the pontoon bridges that allowed his forces to cross into mainland Greece. Nevertheless, they were reportedly harshly punished by the Persian king following his ultimate defeat at the Battle of Salamis, which he blamed on Phoenician cowardice and incompetence.

In the mid-4th century BC, King Tennes of Sidon led a failed rebellion against Artaxerxes III, enlisting the help of the Egyptians, who were subsequently drawn into a war with the Persians. A detailed account of the rebellion and subsequent conflict was described by Diodorus Siculus. The resulting destruction of the city led once more to the resurgence of its rival Tyre, which remained the principal Phoenician city for two decades until the arrival of Alexander the Great.

== Hellenistic period (332–63 BC) ==
Located on the western periphery of the Persian Empire, Phoenicia was one of the first areas to be conquered by Alexander the Great during his military campaigns across western Asia. Alexander's main target in the Persian Levant was Tyre, now the region's largest and most important city. It capitulated after a roughly seven month siege, during which many of its citizens fled to Carthage. Tyre's refusal to allow Alexander to visit its temple to Melqart, culminating in the killing of his envoys, led to a brutal reprisal: 2,000 of its leading citizens were crucified and a puppet ruler was installed. The rest of Phoenicia easily came under his control, with Sidon, the second most powerful city, surrendering peacefully.

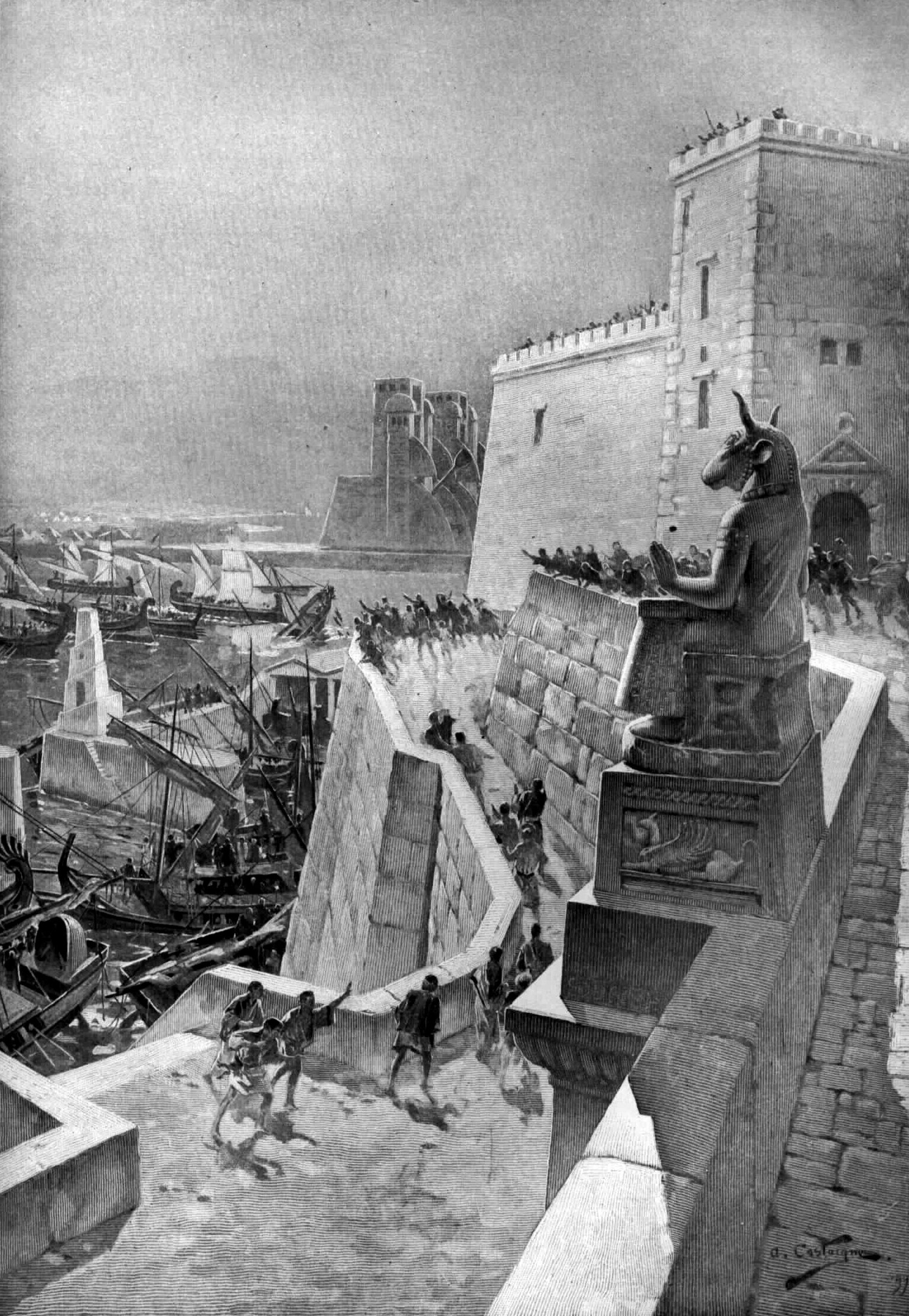
A naval action during Alexander the Great's siege of Tyre (350 BC). Drawing by André Castaigne, 1888–89.

Unlike the Phoenicians—and for that matter their former Persian rulers—the Greeks were notably indifferent, if not hostile, to foreign cultures. Alexander's empire had a policy of Hellenization, whereby Greek culture, religion, and sometimes language were spread or imposed across conquered peoples. This was typically implemented through the founding of new cities (most notably Alexandria in Egypt), the settlement of a Greek urban elite, and the alteration of native place names to Greek.

However, the Phoenicians were once again an outlier within an empire: there was evidently no "organised, deliberate effort of Hellenisation in Phoenicia", and with one or two minor exceptions, all Phoenician city states retained their native names, while Greek settlement and administration appears to have been limited. This is despite the fact that adjacent areas had been Hellenized, as had peripheral territories like the Caucasus and Bactria.

The Phoenicians also continued to maintain cultural and commercial links with their western counterparts. Polybius recounts how the Seleucid king Demetrius I escaped from Rome by boarding a Carthaginian ship that was delivering goods to Tyre. An inscription in Malta, made between the second and third centuries BC, was dedicated to Herakles/Melqart in both Phoenician and Greek. To the extent the Phoenicians were subject to some degree of Hellenization, "there was much continuity with their Phoenician past—in language and perhaps in institutions; certainly in their cults; probably in some sort of literary tradition; perhaps in the preservation of archives; and certainly in a continuous historical consciousness." There is even evidence that a Hellenistic-Phoenician culture spread inland to Syria. The adaptation to Macedonian rule was likely aided by the Phoenician's historical ties with the Greeks, with whom they shared some mythological stories and figures; the two peoples were even sometimes considered "relatives".

Alexander's empire collapsed soon after his death in 323 BC, dissolving into several rival kingdoms ruled by his generals, relatives, or friends. The Phoenicians came under the control of the largest and most powerful of these successors, the Seleucids. The Phoenician homeland was repeatedly contested by the Ptolemaic Kingdom of Egypt during the forty year Syrian Wars, coming under Ptolemaic rule in the third century BC. The Seleucids reclaimed the area the following century, holding it until the mid-first century BC. Under their rule, the Phoenicians were evidently allowed a considerable degree of autonomy.

During the Seleucid Dynastic Wars (157–63 BC), the Phoenician cities were fought over by the warring factions of the Seleucid royal family. The Seleucid Empire, which once stretched from the Aegean Sea to Pakistan, was reduced to a rump state comprising portions of the Levant and southeast Anatolia. Little is known of life in Phoenicia during this time, but the Seleucids were severely weakened, and their realm left as a buffer between various rival states, before being annexed to the Roman Republic by Pompey in 63 BC. After centuries of decline, the last vestiges of Phoenician power in the Eastern Mediterranean were absorbed into the Roman province of Coele-Syria.
