= Gallia Celtica =

Cultural region of Gaul inhabited by Celts

- Cultural region of Gaul
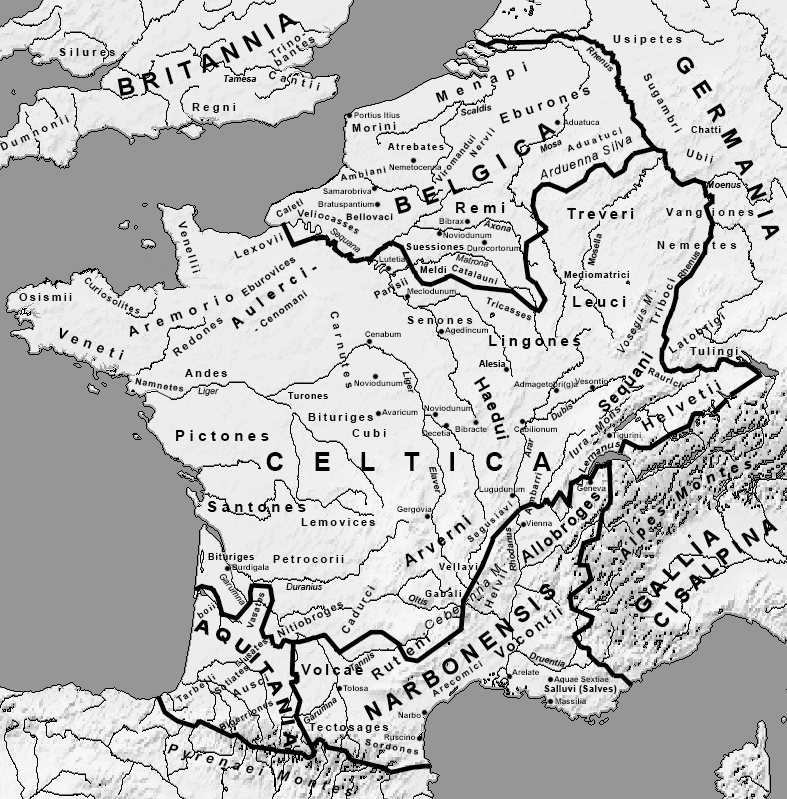
- Map with the approximate location of the Celtica region of Gaul before the Roman conquest
- Demonym: Celts
- Today part of: France, Switzerland, Luxembourg and Germany

Gallia Celtica, meaning "Celtic Gaul" in Latin, was a cultural region of Gaul inhabited by Celts, located in what is now France, Switzerland, Luxembourg and the west bank of the Rhine River in Germany.

According to Roman ethnography and Julius Caesar in his narrative Commentaries on the Gallic War (Commentarii De Bello Gallico), Gaul was divided into three main regions: Belgica, Aquitania and Celtica. The inhabitants of Belgica were called Belgae, those of Aquitania were called Aquitani. The inhabitants of the Celtica region called themselves Celts in their own language, and were later called Galli by Julius Caesar:

All Gaul is divided into three parts, one of which the Belgae inhabit, the Aquitani another, those who in their own language are called Celts, in ours Galli, the third.

A similar definition is given by Pliny the Elder:

The whole of Gaul that is comprehended under the one general name of Comata, is divided into three groups of people, which are more especially kept distinct from each other by the following rivers. From the Scaldis to the Sequana it is Belgica; from the Sequana to the Garumna it is Celtica or Lugdunensis; and from the Garumna to the promontory of the Pyrenæan range it is Aquitanica, formerly called Aremorica.
