= Urban enclosures in Roman Gaul =

Fortified structure

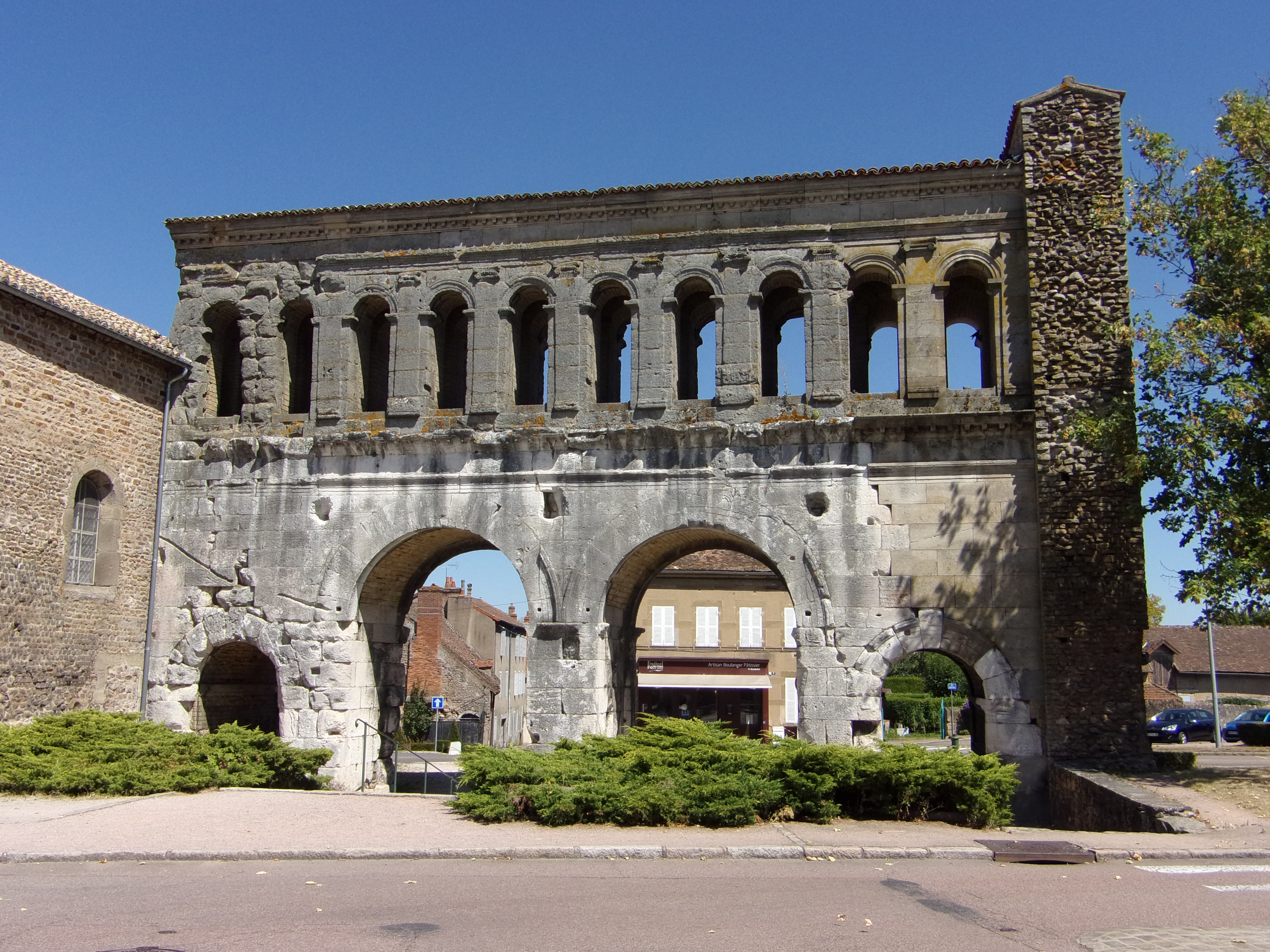
The Saint-André Gate in Autun. (Walls of the High Empire.)

In Roman Gaul, an urban enclosure was a fortified structure composed of ramparts, gates, and towers, built around cities between the end of the Roman conquest and the fall of the Roman Empire.

These enclosures are generally classified into two main types. The High Empire enclosures, constructed between 27 BC and the mid-3rd century AD during the Pax Romana, were relatively few and encompassed large areas, often extending beyond the inhabited zones. Their role was primarily symbolic rather than defensive. In contrast, the Late Empire enclosures, built mainly from the second half of the 3rd century to around 370 AD, were more numerous, smaller in scale, and featured substantial fortifications serving clear military purposes.

== Enclosures of the High Empire ==
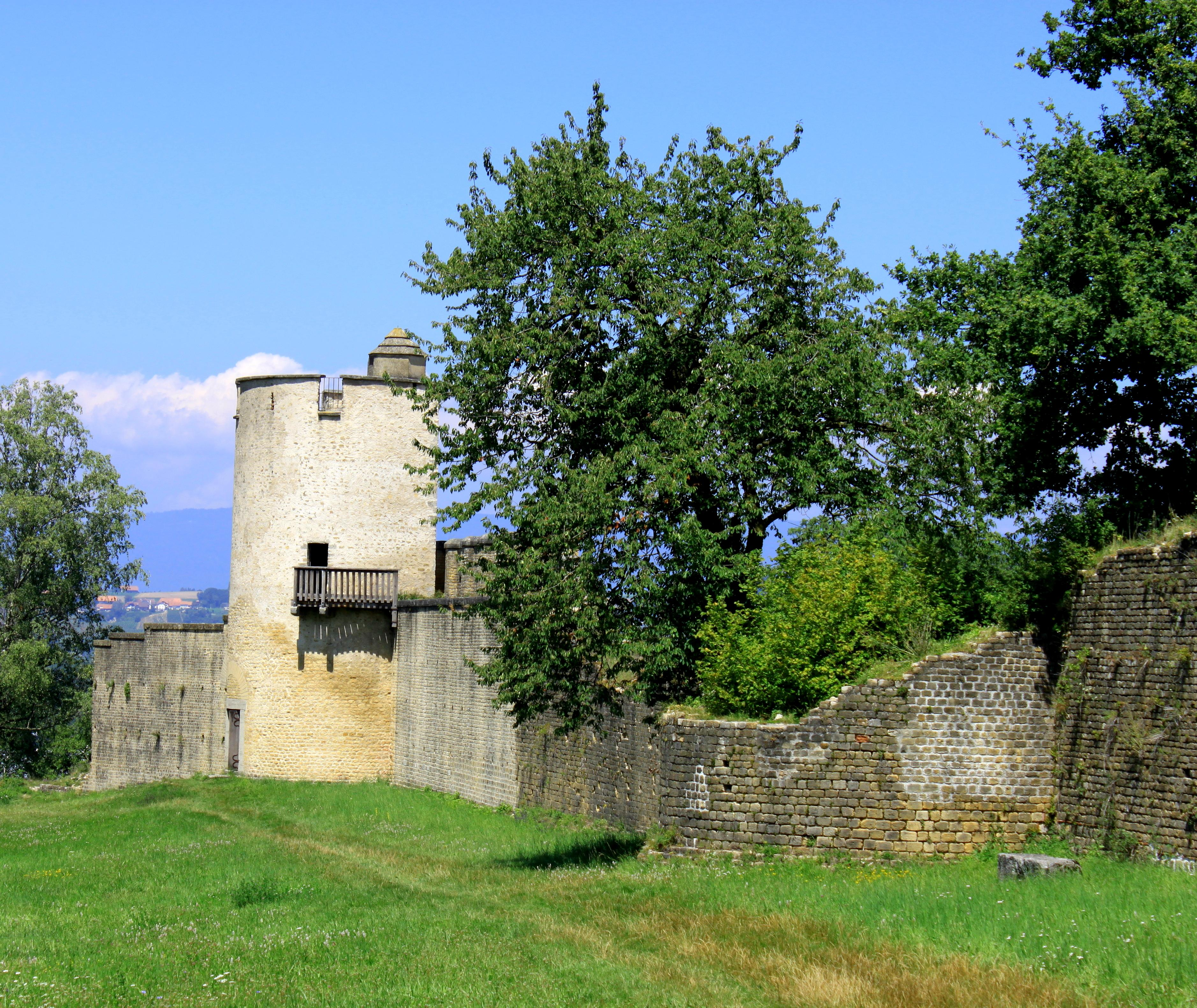
The walls of the High Empire in Avenches (Switzerland).

Most civitas capitals in Roman Gaul were established after the conquest of Gaul, during the reign of Augustus (27 BC – AD 14). For the majority of these Gallo-Roman cities, the stability of the Pax Romana made defensive structures unnecessary. However, eighteen cities were equipped with walls, mainly colonies such as Vienne (Colonia Iulia Viennensis), located east of a line from Tongeren to Arles and in the Roussillon region. Most of these fortifications were built around the beginning of the Common Era, with a smaller number constructed later, up to the late 2nd century, such as in Cologne under Claudius and in Trier toward the end of the century.

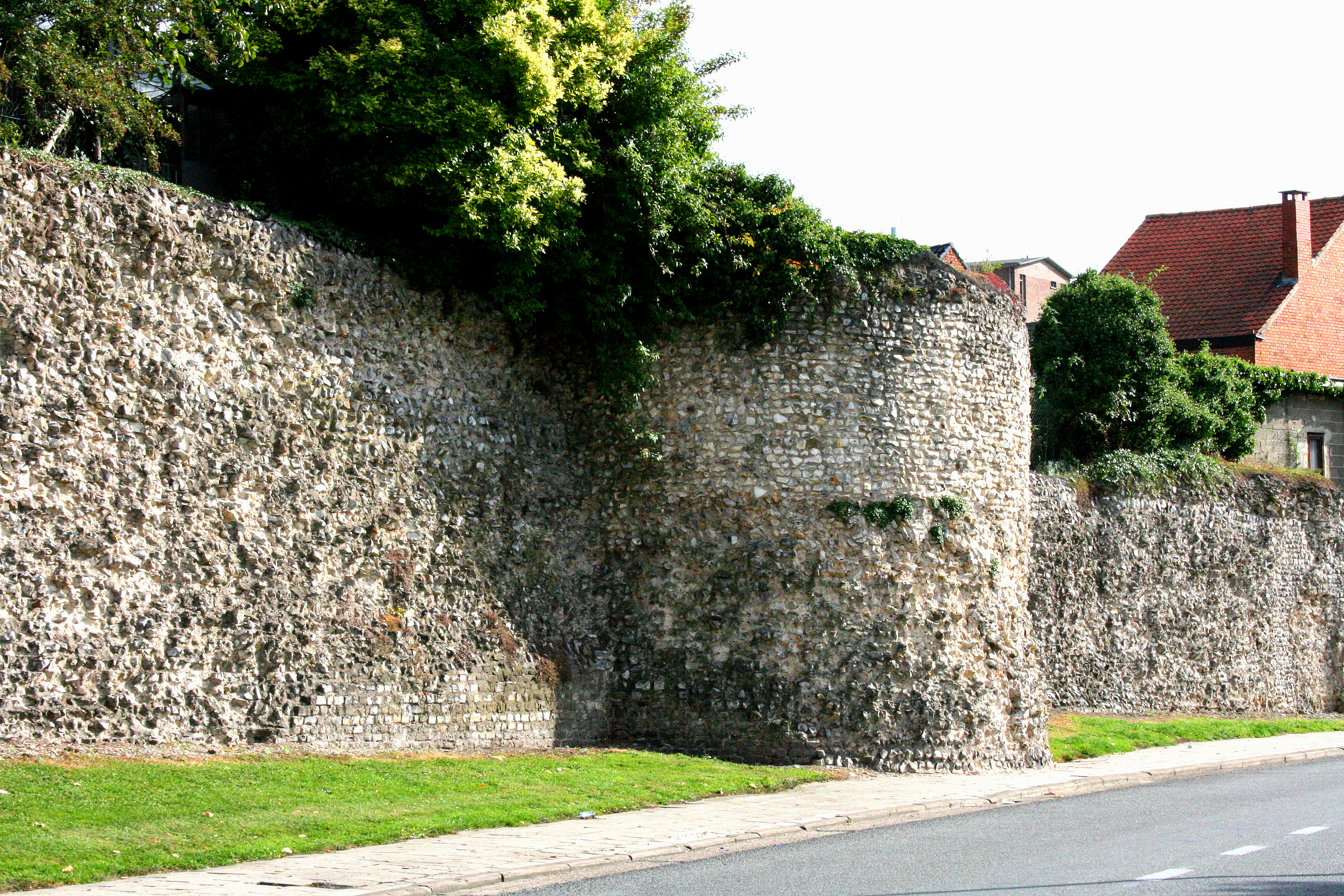
The walls of the High Empire in Tongeren.

Despite regional variations, these early enclosures shared several common characteristics. The enclosed areas were extensive, ranging from about 35 hectares at Fréjus to 285 hectares at Trier, and their layout generally followed the natural contours of the terrain, often extending beyond the inhabited zone. The walls were built on shallow or absent foundations, with a moderate thickness of 2.2 to 3 meters and a typical height of less than 6 meters. They featured monumental gates, as seen at Autun (Augustodunum) and Trier, and were reinforced by regularly spaced towers, usually circular or U-shaped in plan.

Walls of this scale were difficult to defend without a substantial garrison. If they had a defensive role, it was likely limited to deterring small or unorganized attacks. More broadly, these structures served to define the city's boundaries and symbolize its status and prestige.

== Fortified enclosures of the Late Empire ==
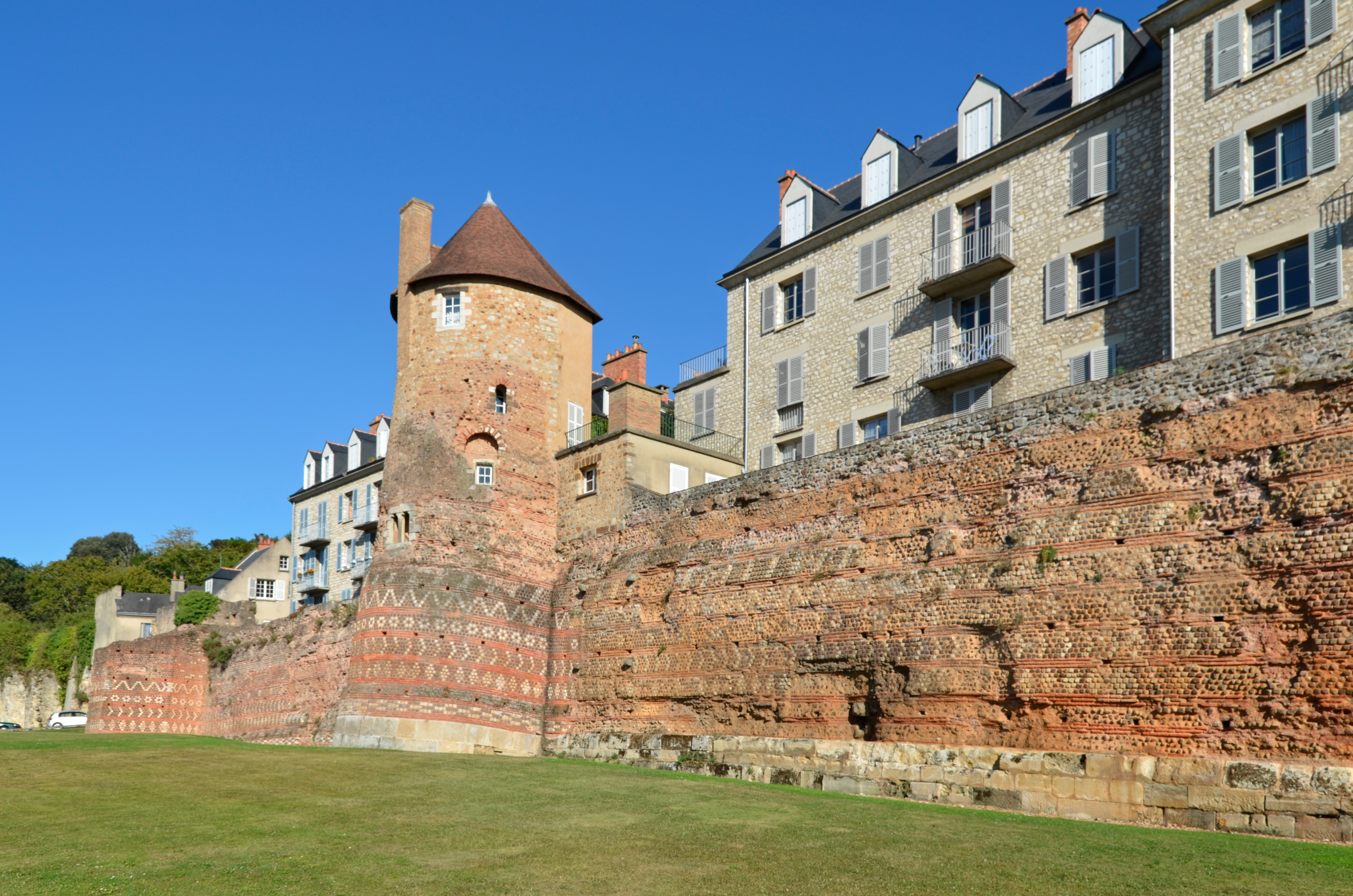
The walls of the Late Roman Empire in Le Mans.

The situation changed significantly during the Late Empire, when many cities constructed defensive enclosures. This development is generally attributed to the crisis that affected the Roman Empire in the 3rd century, which disrupted military defenses along the Germanic limes. The first incursions by Germanic groups took place in 233–234 AD, followed by repeated invasions culminating in a major crisis in 275 AD. In response to the breakdown of frontier defenses, the Roman administration appears to have promoted the construction of smaller fortified enclosures around civitas capitals. The prevailing insecurity was further aggravated by the actions of the Bagaudae, groups of rebels and deserters who raided territories across the Gallic provinces.

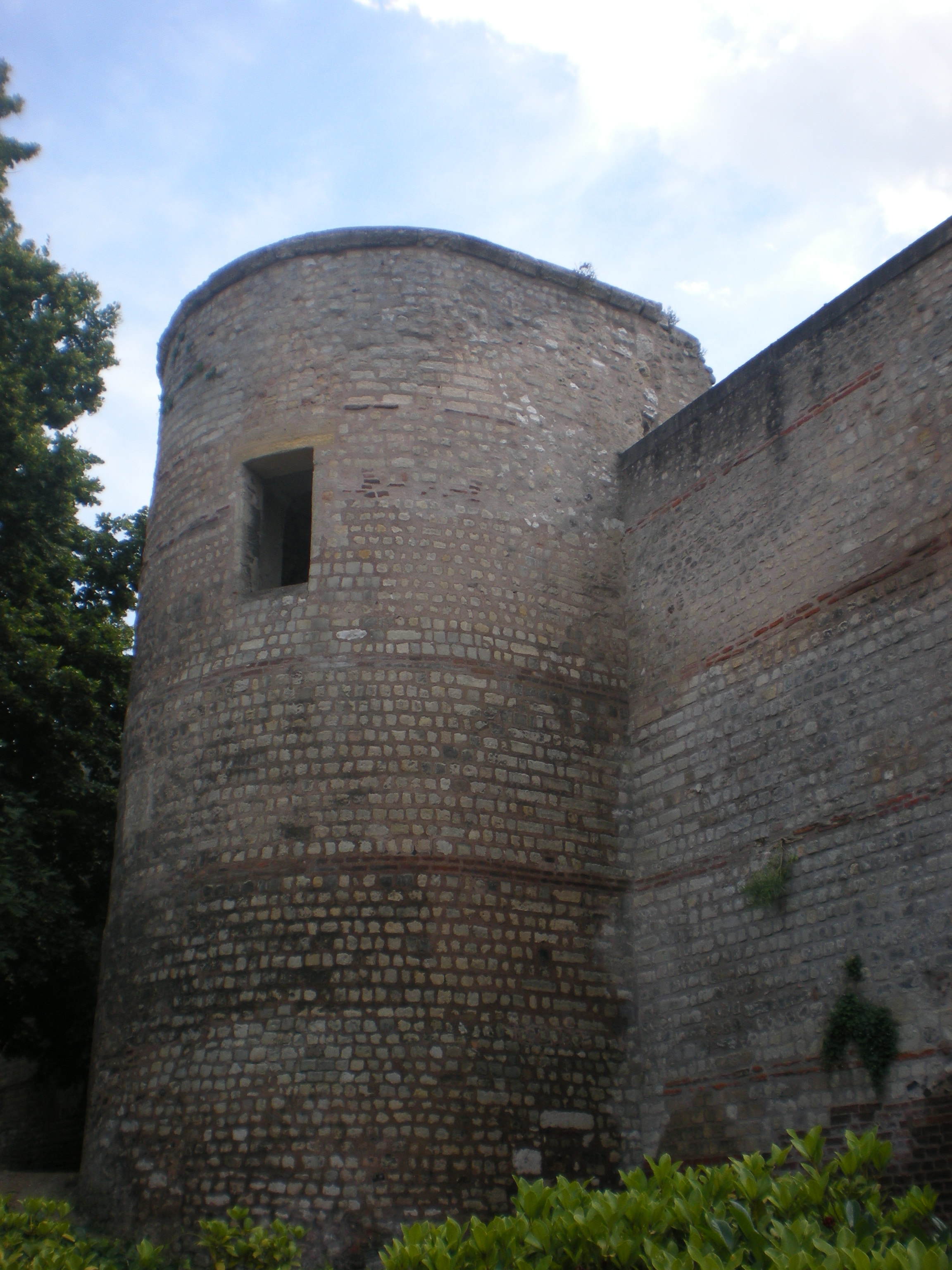
Beauvais Tower and Ramparts.

The perimeters of the Late Empire enclosures were significantly smaller—about 840 meters at Senlis and 2,600 meters at Poitiers—making them easier to defend than the extensive circuits of the High Empire. Whenever possible, existing public buildings from the earlier period were integrated into the fortifications as bastions, such as amphitheaters at Périgueux, Poitiers, Metz, Tours, and Lillebonne, forum galleries at Bavay, or commemorative arches at Reims. The overall design of these new enclosures was generally simple, most often quadrilateral or oval in shape.

The Late Empire city walls were built with a clear defensive purpose. The ramparts were thick—often exceeding 3 meters—and high, typically 8 to 10 meters, reinforced with towers, and featured a limited number of relatively narrow gates, in contrast to the monumental gates of High Empire enclosures. Construction often incorporated materials from earlier buildings (Note: The Theodosian Code provided for and recommended the reuse of temple materials (XVI, 10, 15; 10, 19; 10, 20) to build walls.) and introduced the use of alternating brick and small stonework (opus mixtum) for the curtain walls, which were founded on large stone blocks. These fortifications were constructed according to carefully developed plans during the relatively stable period at the end of the 3rd century, with attention to both structural and aesthetic considerations, as observed at sites such as Le Mans.

== See also ==
- Gaul
- Gallic Wars
- Fall of the Western Roman Empire

== Bibliography ==
- Bedon, Robert; Chevallier, Raymond; Pinon, Pierre (1988). Architecture et urbanisme en Gaule romaine : l'architecture et la ville [Architecture and urban planning in Roman Gaul: architecture and the city]. Les Hespérides (in French). Vol. 1. Errance. ISBN 2 903 44279 7.
- Coulon, Gérard (2006). Les Gallo-Romains [The Gallo-Romans]. Civilisations et cultures (in French). Paris: Errance. ISBN 2 877 72331 3.
- Duby, Georges (1980). Histoire de la France urbaine [History of Urban France]. L’univers historique (in French). Vol. 1: La ville antique, des origines au IXe siècle. Paris: Seuil. ISBN 2 020 05590 2.
