= Los Toscanos =

Andalusian cortijo in Spain

Toscanos
- Location within Spain
- 36°44′27″N 4°6′59″W
- Satellite of: Phoenicia, Carthage
- Location: Vélez, Spain
- Region: Andalusia
- Part of: Phoenician colonies

History
- Built: 8th century BC

Toscanos (in Spanish Cortijo de Los Toscanos) is the name of an Andalusian cortijo near Vélez-Málaga in southern Spain, and was the location of an early Phoenician settlement.

The Phoenician name of the settlement is unknown. The modern toponym of Toscanos is due to Italian migrants who arrived in the area in the 18th century during the reign of Charles III.

== Geography ==
Toscanos is located on a flattened hill overlooking the mouth of the Velez River at the Mediterranean. The hill is on the right bank of the river.

At the height of Toscanos's prosperity around 700 BC, the humidity index was higher than at present and large forests covered the Penibetic Mountains.

== History ==
This settlement was one of a number of such colonies established in southern Spain around the 8th century BC to control trade with the Iberian settlements in the interior. The town does not seem to have been a major center for trade or industry involving any kind of metallic ores, but there are murex remains from the processing of dye and evidence of fishing for tuna, sturgeon, and eels as well as the associated processing of salting and preserved sauces like garum. They seem to have principally traded in agricultural goods, raising cattle, sheep, and goats; producing olive oil and wine; and hunting deer, boar, and wild cats.

Toscanos began with an orderly street plan covering about 2.5 hectares (6 acres) and a fortified perimeter. From the middle of the 8th century BC, "large and luxurious" houses as wide as 15 meters (50 ft). In the 7th century BC, there was growth throughout the Phoenician colonies in Spain and Toscanos saw the construction of a great central "storehouse". The variety of surrounding homes suggests a diverse settlement of families including a mercantile elite, artisans, laborers, and slaves. Around 635 BC, the town added a new fortified district and had a population between 1000 and 1500. It covered about 12 hectares (30 acres), 50% larger than the settlement at Agadir (Cadiz), and traded with Greece and Cyprus.

Along with other Phoenician colonies, it underwent various crises during the 6th century BC. The settlement in particular suffered a collapse in its trade with the interior, and the large storehouse and grand houses around it ceased to be used in the early part of the century. The central settlement was abandoned around 550 BC and the rest were finally abandoned for Cerro del Mar on the other side of the Velez. With the rise of Carthaginian control over the Phoenician diaspora, political and commercial power in the area concentrated itself at nearby Malakat (Málaga).

== Legacy ==
Asteroid 96086 Toscanos, discovered by astronomers during the second Palomar–Leiden Trojan survey in 1973, was named for the archaeological site.
