= Geographia Sacra seu Phaleg et Canaan =

1646 book by Samuel Bochart

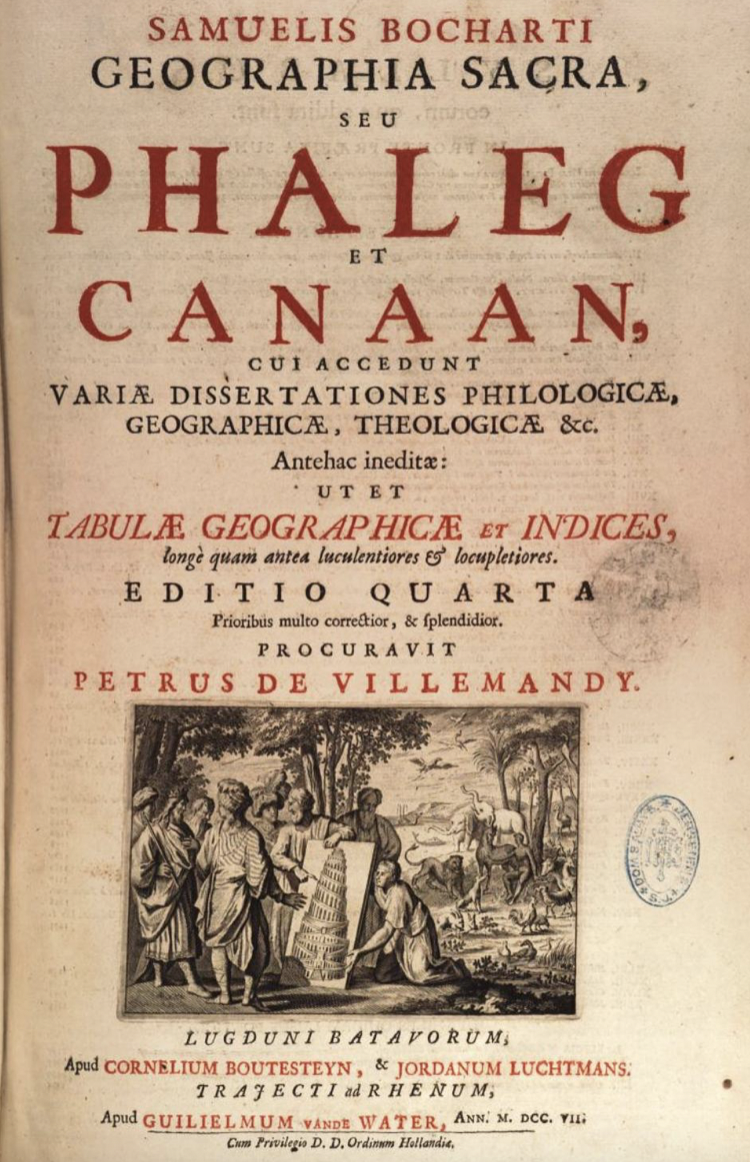
- Cover of the fourth edition, 1708
- Author: Samuel Bochart
- Language: Latin
- Genre: Biblical criticism
- Publication date: 1646
- Publication place: Caen, France

Geographia Sacra seu Phaleg et Canaan (in English: "Sacred Geography or Peleg and Canaan") is a work of biblical criticism and world history by French author Samuel Bochart, first published in 1646. It was originally written in two books, combined in later editions.

The first volume, entitled Phaleg, seu de Dispersione Gentium et Terrarum Divisione Facta in Aedificatione Turris Babel ("Peleg or the Dispersion of Nations and the Division of Lands Made in the Building of the Tower of Babel"), was devoted to the Generations of Noah and the modern names of the tribes lists in Genesis 10. The second book, originally entitled Chanaan seu de Coloniis Et Sermone Phoenicum ("Canaan or On the Colonies and the Phoenician Language"), studied the history of Phoenician colonization and the Phoenician and Punic languages. The work was highly influential in seventeenth-century Biblical exegesis and modern Phoenician historiography.

Peleg was the first detailed analysis of the Generations of Noah since classical times, becoming – and remaining – the locus classicus for such scholarship.

Canaan was the first full-length book devoted to the Phoenicians, creating a framework narrative for future scholars of a maritime-based trading society with linguistic and philological influence across the region. By doing this, the work also established the foundations for the comparative science of Semitic antiquities.

== Phaleg ==
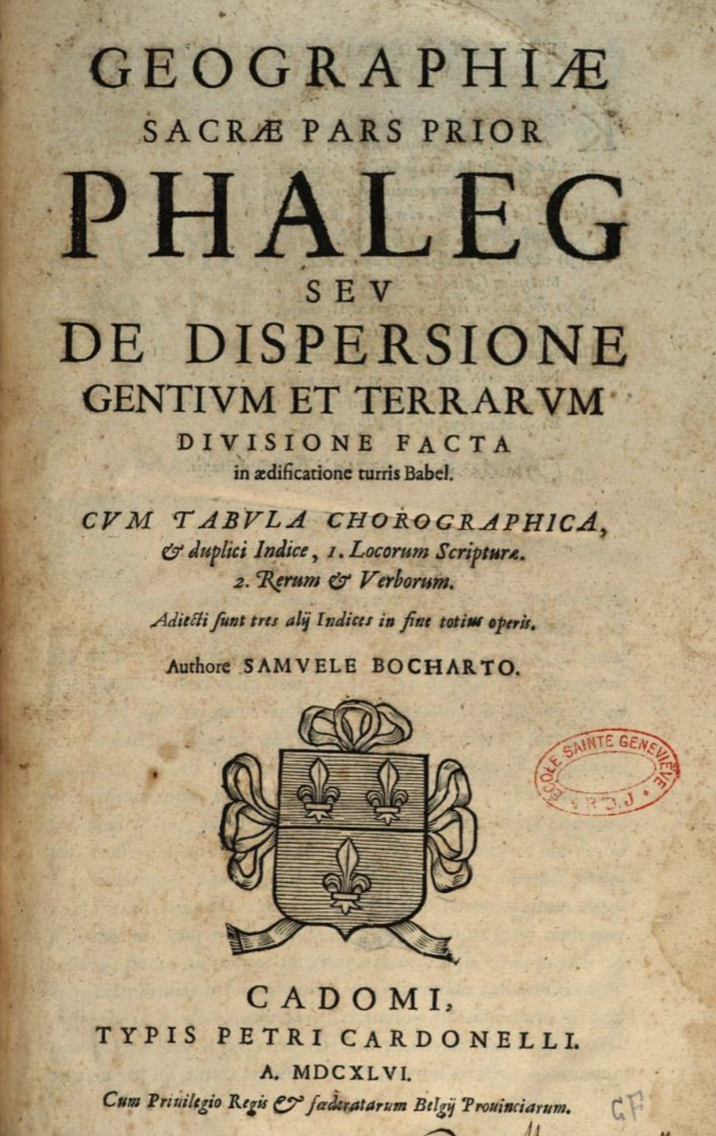
First edition (Phaleg)

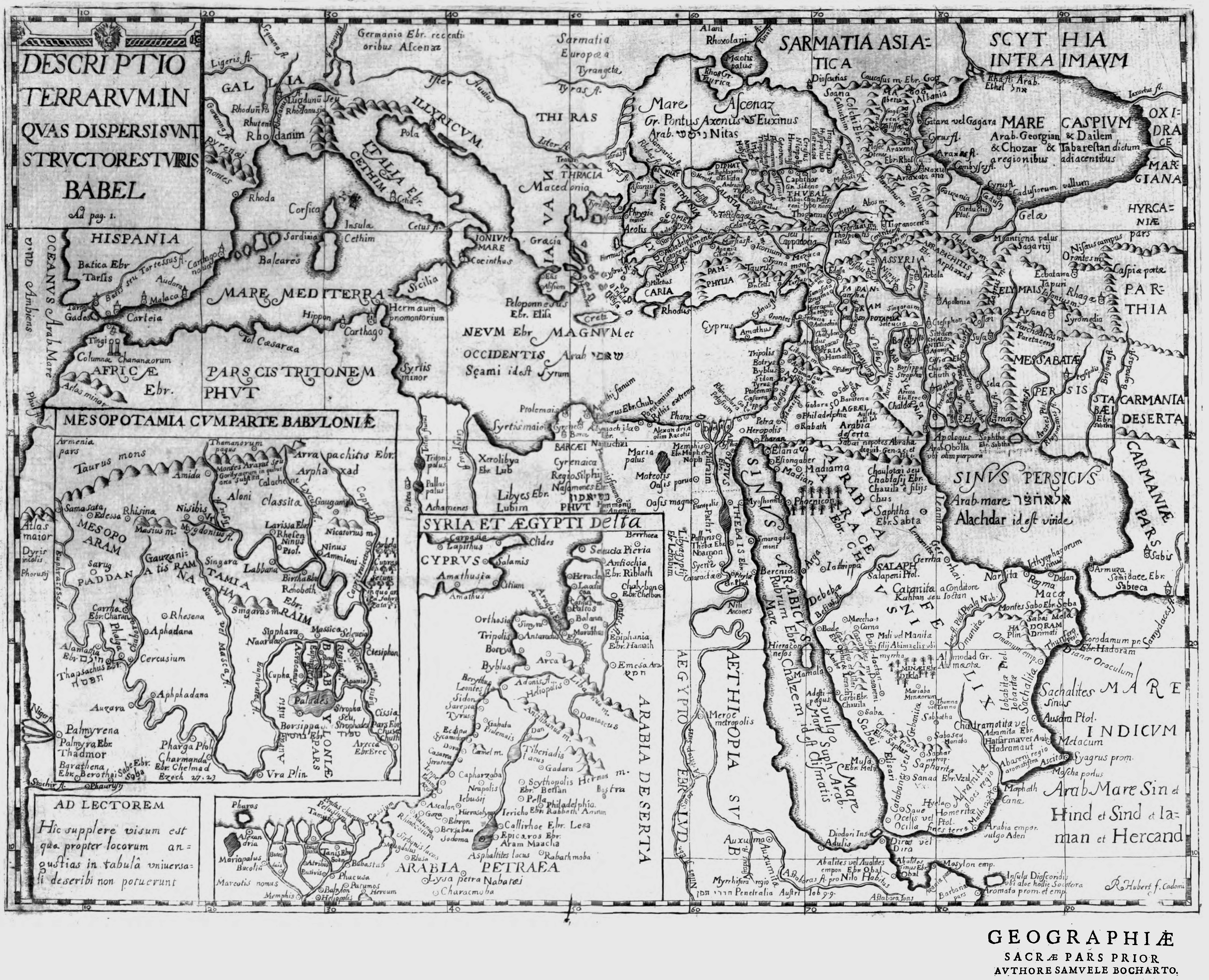
Bochart's illustration of the world according to Genesis 10

Bochart's goal was to reconstruct the historical geography of the ancient world by studying biblical philology. The name Phaleg / Peleg refers to Genesis 10:25 and 1 Chronicles 1:19, which state that it was during the time of Peleg that the earth was divided.

The book is split into four parts:

1. Prologue (προλεγόμενον)
2. The Descendants of Shem
3. The Descendants of Japheth
4. The Descendants of Ham

The prologue is split into 16 chapters. The first two compare the Genesis story with Roman gods: Noah with Saturn, Canaan with Mercury, Nimrod with Bacchus, and Magog with Prometheus. Chapters 3–14 provide detailed commentary on the Genesis flood narrative and the Tower of Babel. Chapter 15 comments on the confusion of languages, and chapter 16 on the dispersion of nations.

In the three following sections, Bochart dedicated a chapter each for every name mentioned in Genesis 10: 30 chapters for Shem's descendants, 15 chapters for Japheth's descendants, and 38 chapters for Ham's descendants.

Bochart’s analysis of the Generations of Noah in Genesis 10 became very popular, and provided the inspiration for numerous works on the same topic in the following centuries. It was one of the earliest attempts to build a single historical narrative from Biblical and classical sources.

== Canaan ==
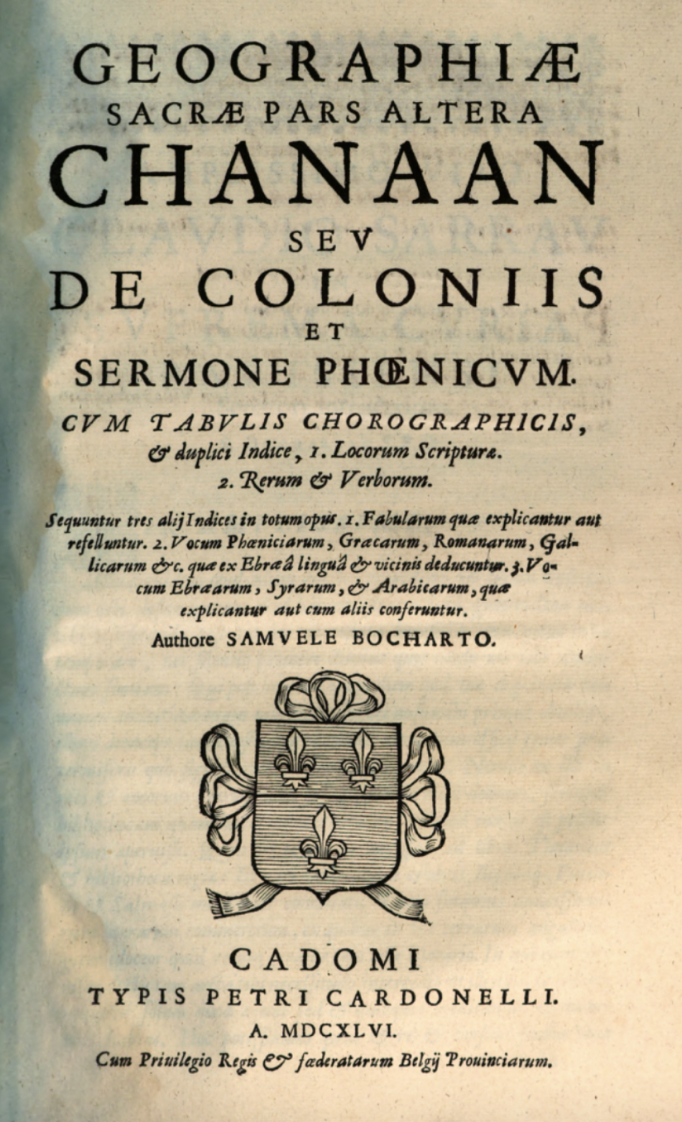
First edition (Chanaan)

The book is split into two parts:

- The Phoenician colonization
- The Phoenician and Punic language.

According to Victor Bérard, Bochart's work reconstituted a "Phoenician Mediterranean": in Cyprus, Egypt, Cilicia, Pisidia, Caria, Rhodes and Samos among others - Bochart even went as far as suggesting the Phoenician influence had reached Britain and possibly America. He reached these conclusions by examining historical legends and contemporary place names; often he would extrapolate conclusions from single facts resulting in a "less admirable habit of finding a Semitic language etymology for all the names of Greek or Roman places."

== Editions ==
- Bochart, Samuel (1646). Geographiae sacra: Phaleg, seu de Dispersione gentium et terrarum divisione facta in aedificatione Turris Babel (in Latin). Vol. 1. typis Petri Cardonelli.
- Bochart, Samuel (1646). Geographia Sacra: Chanaan Seu De Coloniis Et Sermone Phoenicum (in Latin). Vol. 2. Cardonelli.
- Bochart, Samuel (1708). Geographia sacra, seu Phaleg et Canaan, cui accedunt variae dissertationes philologicae, geographicae, theologicae, &c., antehac ineditae, ut et tabulae geographicae et indices longè quam antea luculentiores et locupletiores (in Latin) (Fourth ed.). Cornelium Boutesteyn & Jordanum Luchtmans.

== Bibliography ==
- Bérard, Victor (1902). Les Phéniciens et l'Odyssée (in French). Armand Colin.
- Droixhe, D. (1978). La linguistique et l'appel de l'histoire (1600-1800): rationalisme et révolutions positivistes. Langue et cultures (in French). Droz. ISBN 978-2-600-04308-3.
- Laplanche, F. (1994). "L'oeuvre de Bochart : une montagne d'érudition". La Bible en France: Entre mythe et critique, XVIe-XIXe siècle (in French). Albin Michel. p. 35ff. ISBN 978-2-226-29736-5.
- Quinn, Josephine (2019). In Search of the Phoenicians. Miriam S. Balmuth Lectures in Ancient History and Archaeology. Princeton University Press. ISBN 978-0-691-19596-4.
- Shalev, Zur (2012). "The Phoenicians are Coming! Samuel Bochart's Protestant Geography". Sacred Words and Worlds Geography, Religion, and Scholarship, 1550–1700. pp. 141–203. doi:10.1163/9789004209381_005. ISBN 9789004209381.
- Stroumsa, G. (2010). A New Science: The Discovery of Religion in the Age of Reason. Harvard University Press. ISBN 978-0-674-04860-7.
