= Samuel Bochart =

French Protestant biblical scholar (1599–1667)

The Reverend Samuel Bochart
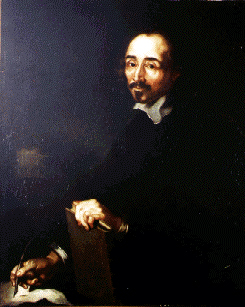
- 17th century portrait of Bochart
- Born: 10 May 1599; Rouen, Normandy, France
- Died: 16 May 1667 (aged 68); Caen, Normandy, France
- Occupations: Biblical scholar, Reformed minister

Samuel Bochart (French: [bɔʃaʁ]; 30 May 1599 – 16 May 1667) was a French biblical scholar and Reformed minister, a student of Thomas Erpenius and the teacher of Pierre Daniel Huet. His two-volume Geographia Sacra seu Phaleg et Canaan (Caen 1646) exerted a profound influence on seventeenth-century Biblical exegesis.

Bochart was one of the several generations of antiquaries who expanded upon the basis Renaissance humanists had laid down, complementing their revolutionary hermeneutics by setting classical texts more firmly within the cultural contexts of Greek and Roman societies, without understanding of which they could never be fully understood. Thus Bochart stands at the beginning of a discipline of the history of ideas that provides the modern context for all textual studies.

== Life ==
Bochart was born in Rouen, in Normandy. He studied philosophy at the Hugeunot Academy of Sedan and theology at the Academy of Saumur, before becoming a pastor of a Protestant church at Caen in 1628. He also studied at Oxford, where he was tutor to Wentworth Dillon, later Earl of Roscommon. His portrait still hangs in the lower reading room of the Bodleian Library.

Bochart's Hierozoicon sive bipartitum opus de animalibus sacrae scripturae (2 vols., London 1663), a zoological treatise on the animals of the Bible was more than a Christianized Pliny's Natural History nor just an expansion of Conrad Gesner's Historiae animalium. Bochart instanced the Arabic naturalists, like al-Damîrî and al-Qazwini, none of whose work had appeared in European print before. His etymologies follow the fanciful tradition inherited from Classical Antiquity and passed to medieval culture through Isidore of Seville.

In 1652 Christina of Sweden invited him to Stockholm, where he studied the Arabic manuscripts in the queen's possession. He was accompanied by Pierre Daniel Huet, afterwards Bishop of Avranches. On his return to Caen he was received into the academy of that city.

Bochart was a man of profound erudition; he possessed a thorough knowledge of the principal Oriental languages, including Hebrew, Syriac, and Arabic; and at an advanced age he wished to learn Ethiopic. Bochart's examples and quotations provided challenges to London typographers, who created typefaces to reproduce them. He was so absorbed in his favorite study, that he saw Phoenician origins even in Celtic words, and hence the number of chimerical etymologies which swarm in his works.

His correspondence on theological subjects, carried on with Cappellus, Salmasius and Vossius was included in his posthumous collected works, and so achieved a wide distribution.

He died of apoplexy, aged 67, in the academy of Caen during an impassioned debate with Huet on the translation of a passage of Origen related to transubstantiation.

== Major works ==
- A Dictionary of Arabic
- Geographia Sacra seu Phaleg et Canaan (Caen 1646)
- De consiliandis in religionis negotio protestantibus, 1662
- Hierozoïcon, (London 1663)
