= Tribe of Judah =

One of the 12 Tribes of Israel

- Map of the twelve tribes of Israel before the move of Dan to the North. (The text is partially in German.)
- Geographical range: West Asia
- Major sites: Hebron, Bethlehem
- Preceded by: New Kingdom of Egypt
- Followed by: Kingdom of Israel (united monarchy)

According to the Hebrew Bible, the tribe of Judah (שֵׁבֶט יְהוּדָה, Shevet Yehudah) was one of the twelve Tribes of Israel, named after Judah, the son of Jacob. Judah was one of the tribes to take its place in Judea, occupying its southern part. Jesse and his sons, including King David, belonged to this tribe.

Judah played a central role in the Deuteronomistic history, which encompasses the books of Deuteronomy through II Kings. After the death of King Solomon, the Tribe of Judah, the Tribe of Benjamin, the Tribe of Dan, and the Levites formed the Southern Kingdom of Judah, with Jerusalem and Hebron as its capital. The kingdom lasted until its conquest by Babylon in c. 586 BCE.

The tribe's symbol was the lion, which was often represented in Jewish art. After the Babylonian captivity, the distinction between the Tribes was largely lost, but the term "Judah", via Yehudi (Hebrew: יהודי), gave rise to the word "Jew" (pl. יהודים, Yehudim). In later traditions, including Christianity and Ethiopian Judaism, the "Lion of the Tribe of Judah" became a messianic symbol.

== Biblical account ==
The tribe of Judah, its conquests, and the centrality of its capital in Jerusalem for the worship of Yahweh featured prominently in the Deuteronomistic history, encompassing the books of Deuteronomy through II Kings, which most scholars agree was reduced to written form, although subject to exilic and post-exilic alterations and emendations, during the reign of the Judahite reformer Josiah from 641–609 BCE.

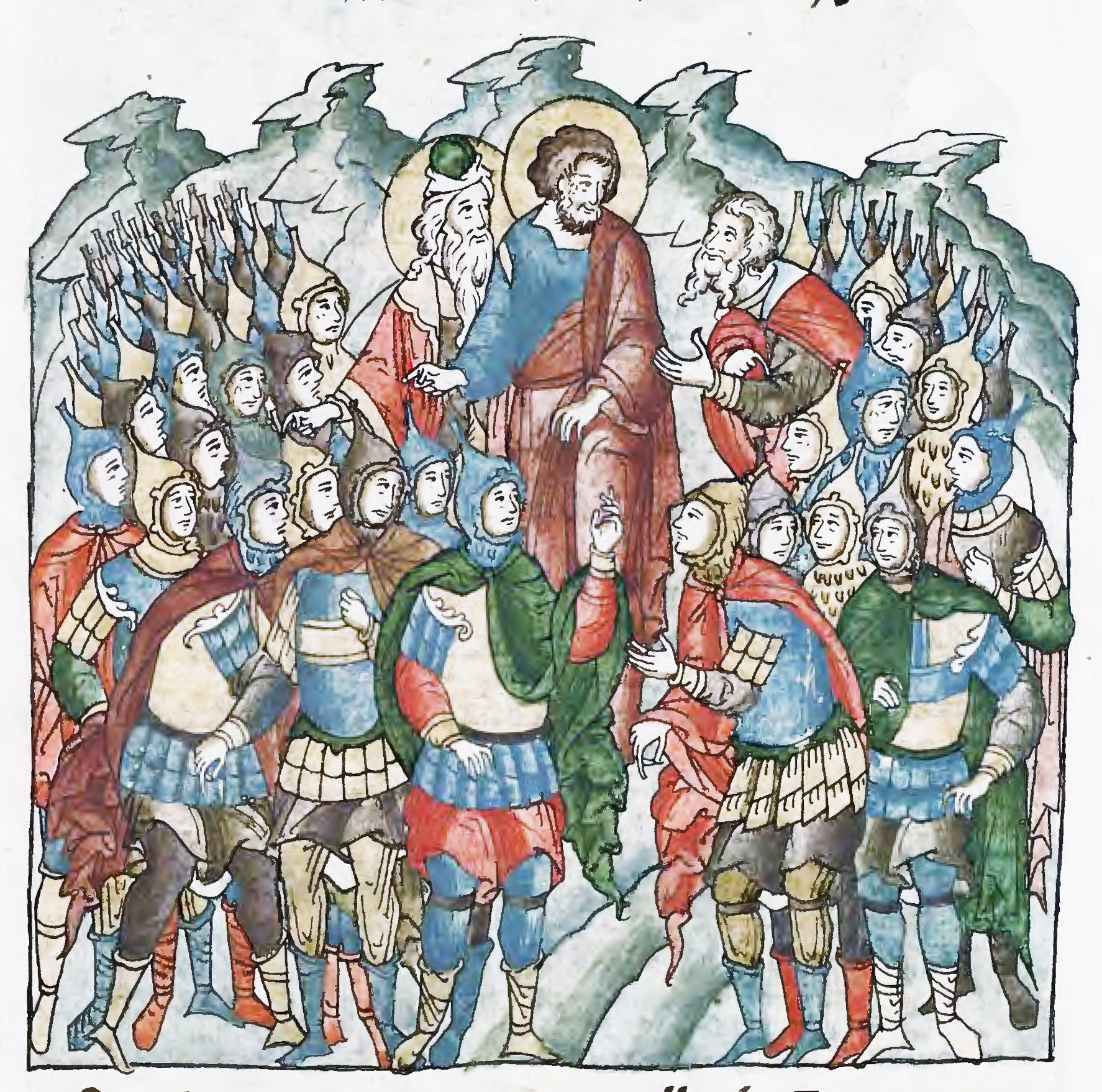
Moses counting Judah's kin

According to the account in the Book of Joshua, following a partial conquest of Canaan by the Israelite tribes (the Jebusites still held Jerusalem), Joshua allocated the land among the twelve tribes. Judah's portion is described in Joshua 15 as encompassing all the Southern Land of Israel, specially the Negev, the Wilderness of Zin and Jerusalem. However, the consensus of modern scholars is that this conquest never occurred. Other scholars point to extra-biblical references to Israel and Canaan as evidence for the potential historicity of the conquest.

In the opening words of the Book of Judges, following the death of Joshua, the Israelites "asked the Lord" which tribe should be first to go to occupy its allotted territory, and the Tribe of Judah was identified as the first tribe. According to the narrative in the Book of Judges, the Tribe of Judah invited the Tribe of Simeon to fight with them in alliance to secure each of their allotted territories. However, many scholars do not believe that the Book of Judges is a reliable historical account.

The Book of Samuel describes God's repudiation of a monarchic line arising from the Southern Tribe of Benjamin due to the sinfulness of King Saul, which was then bestowed onto the tribe of Judah for all time in the person of King David. In Samuel's account, after the death of Saul, all the tribes other than Judah remained loyal to the House of Saul, while Judah chose David as its king. However, after the death of Ish-bosheth, Saul's son and successor to the throne of Israel, all the other Israelite tribes made David, who was then the King of Judah, king of a single Re-United Kingdom of Israel. The Book of Kings follows the expansion and unparalleled glory of the United Monarchy under King Solomon. A majority of scholars believe that the accounts concerning David and Solomon's territory in the "united monarchy" are exaggerated, and a minority believe that the "united monarchy" never existed at all. Disagreeing with the latter view, Old Testament scholar Walter Dietrich contends that the biblical stories of circa 10th-century BCE monarchs contain a significant historical kernel and are not simply late fictions.

On the accession of Rehoboam, Solomon's son, in c. 930 BCE, the Ten Northern Tribes of Israel under the leadership of Jeroboam from the Tribe of Ephraim split from the House of David to create the Northern Kingdom in Samaria. The Book of Kings is uncompromising in its low opinion of its larger and richer neighbor to the north and understands its conquest by Assyria in 722 BCE as divine retribution for the Kingdom's return to idolatry.

The Tribes of Judah, Southern Dan and Benjamin remained loyal to the House of David. These tribes formed the Kingdom of Judah, which existed until Judah was conquered by Babylon in c. 586 BCE and the population was deported.

When the Jews returned from Babylonian exile, residual tribal affiliations were abandoned, probably because of the impossibility of reestablishing previous tribal land holdings. However, the special religious roles decreed for the Levites and Kohanim were preserved, but Jerusalem became the sole place of worship and sacrifice among the returning exiles, northerners and southerners alike.

=== Territory and main cities ===
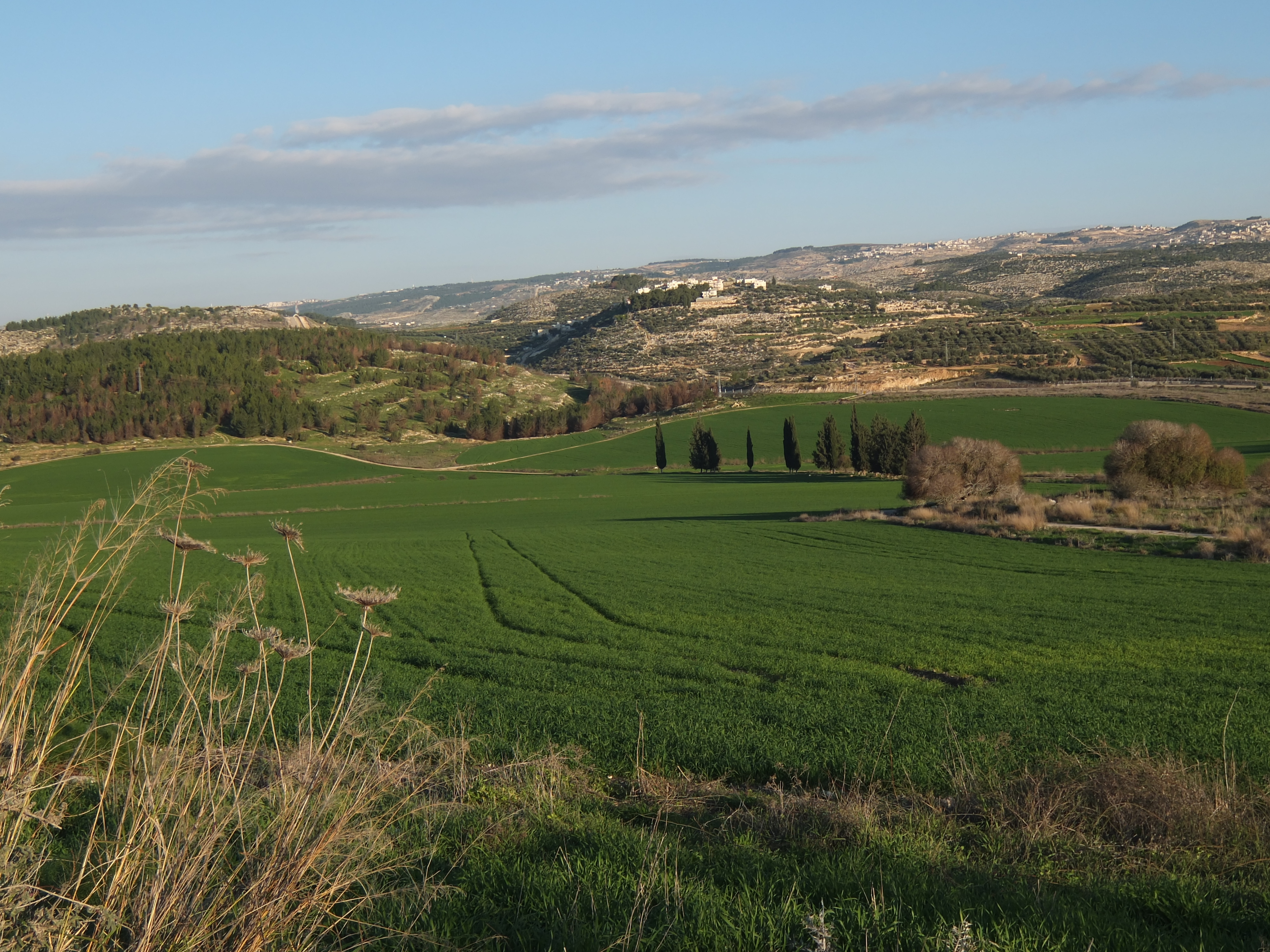
The Valley of Elah, near Adullam, in the territorial boundary of Judah

According to the biblical account, at its height, the tribe of Judah was the leading tribe of the Kingdom of Judah, and occupied most of the territory of the kingdom, except for a small region in the northeast occupied by Benjamin, and an enclave towards the south-west which was occupied by Simeon. Bethlehem and Hebron were initially the main cities within the territory of the tribe.

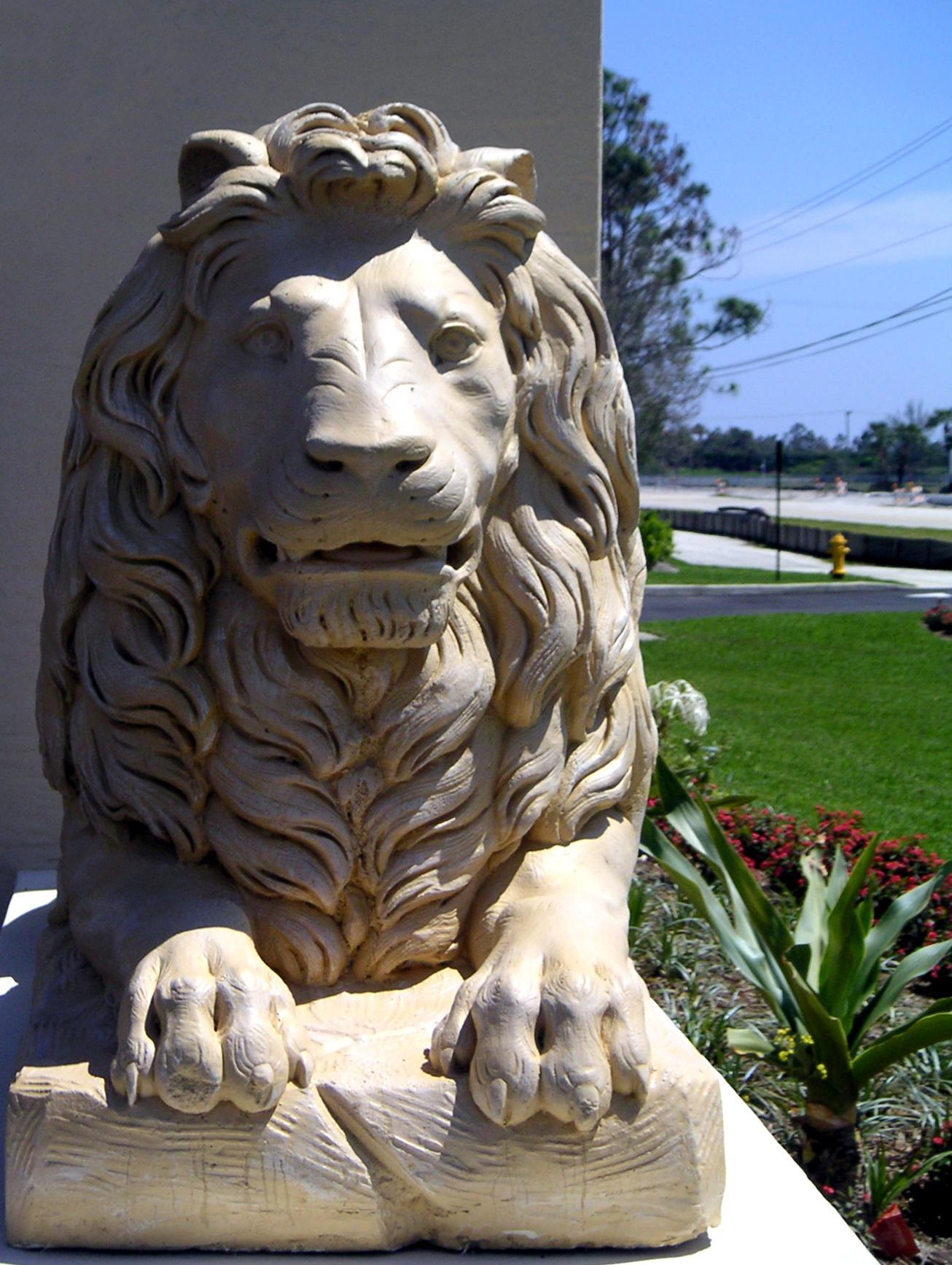
The lion is the symbol of the tribe of Judah. It is often represented in Jewish art, such as this sculpture outside a synagogue

The size of the territory of the tribe of Judah meant that in practice it had four distinct regions:

- The Negev (Hebrew: south) – the southern portion of the land, which was highly suitable for pasture.
- The Shephelah (Hebrew: lowland) – the coastal region, between the highlands and the Mediterranean sea, which was used for agriculture, in particular for grains.
- The wilderness – the barren region immediately next to the Dead Sea, and below sea level; it was wild, and barely inhabitable, to the extent that animals and people which were made unwelcome elsewhere, such as bears, leopards, and outlaws, made it their home. In biblical times, this region was further subdivided into three sections – the wilderness of En Gedi, the wilderness of Judah, and the wilderness of Maon.
- The hill country – the elevated plateau situated between the Shephelah and the wilderness, with rocky slopes but very fertile soil. This region was used for the production of grain, olives, grapes, and other fruit, and hence produced oil and wine.
- In the Tanakh, Shicron was one of the landmarks at the western end of the north boundary of the Tribe of Judah (Joshua 15:1). It was probably located near Ekron.

Judah had assigned him by lot the upper part of Judea, reaching as far as Jerusalem, and its breadth extended to the Lake of Sodom. Now in the lot of this tribe there were the cities of Askelon and Gaza.

== Origin ==
According to the Torah, the Tribe consisted of Descendants of Judah, the fourth son of Jacob and of Leah. Some biblical scholars view this as an etiological myth created in hindsight to explain the tribe's name and connect it to the other tribes in the Israelite confederation. With Leah as a matriarch, biblical scholars regard the tribe as having been believed by the text's authors to have been part of the original Israelite confederation.

Like the other tribes of the Kingdom of Judah, the Tribe of Judah is entirely absent from the ancient Song of Deborah. Traditionally, this has been explained as being due to the southern kingdom being too far away to be involved in the battle, but Israel Finkelstein et al. claim the alternative explanation that the southern kingdom was simply an insignificant rural backwater at the time the poem was written.

Judah	Daughter of Shuah
Er	Tamar	Onan	Shelah
Perez & Zerah (twins)

Professor Aaron Demsky argues that the genealogical record of Shelah and his sons was an allegory of the history of Shelanite clans in Shephelah (i.e. Judean foothills). These clans established cities such as Lecah (or Lachish) and Mareshah. They also worked as potters and craftsmen for the king, particularly Hezekiah. After the Assyrians destroyed their cities, survivors fled to Jerusalem and fully assimilated with the inhabitants by 538 BC, when the Babylonian exiles returned to Jerusalem.

== Character ==
Many of the Jewish leaders and prophets of the Hebrew Bible claimed membership in the tribe of Judah. For example, the literary prophets Isaiah, Amos, Joel, Micah, Obadiah, Zechariah, and Zephaniah, all belonged to the tribe.

The genealogies given in Matthew 1:1–6 and Luke 3:23–34 in the New Testament describe Jesus as a Descendant of David, Matthew through Solomon and Luke through Nathan.

== Fate ==
The Lion of Judah on the municipal emblem of Jerusalem

As part of the Kingdom of Judah, the tribe of Judah survived the destruction of Israel by the Assyrians, and instead was subjected to the Babylonian captivity; when the captivity ended, the distinction between the tribes were lost in favour of a common identity. Since Simeon and Benjamin had been very much the junior partners in the Kingdom of Judah, it was Judah that gave its name to the identity—that of the Jews.

After the fall of Jerusalem, Babylonia (modern-day Iraq), would become the focus of Judaism for 1,000 years. The first Jewish communities in Babylonia started with the exile of the tribe of Judah to Babylon by Jehoiachin in 597 BCE as well as after the destruction of the Temple in Jerusalem in 586 BCE. Many more Jews migrated to Babylon in CE 135 after the Bar Kokhba revolt and in the centuries after.

The triumph or victory of "the Lion of the Tribe of Judah", who is able to open the scroll and its seven seals, forms part of the vision of the writer of the Book of Revelation in the New Testament.

Ethiopia's traditions, recorded and elaborated in a 14th-century treatise, the "Kebre Negest", assert descent from a retinue of Israelites who returned with the Queen of Sheba from her visit to King Solomon in Jerusalem, by whom she had conceived the Solomonic dynasty's founder, Menelik I. Both Christian and Jewish Ethiopian tradition has it that these immigrants were mostly of the Tribes of Dan and Judah; hence the Ge'ez motto Mo`a 'Anbessa Ze'imnegede Yihuda ("The Lion of the Tribe of Judah has conquered"), one of many names for Jesus of Nazareth.

== See also ==
- History of ancient Israel and Judah
