= Chezib of Judah =

Canaanite - Israelite town of Judah

Chezib
- כזיב (Hebrew)
- Achzib of Judah
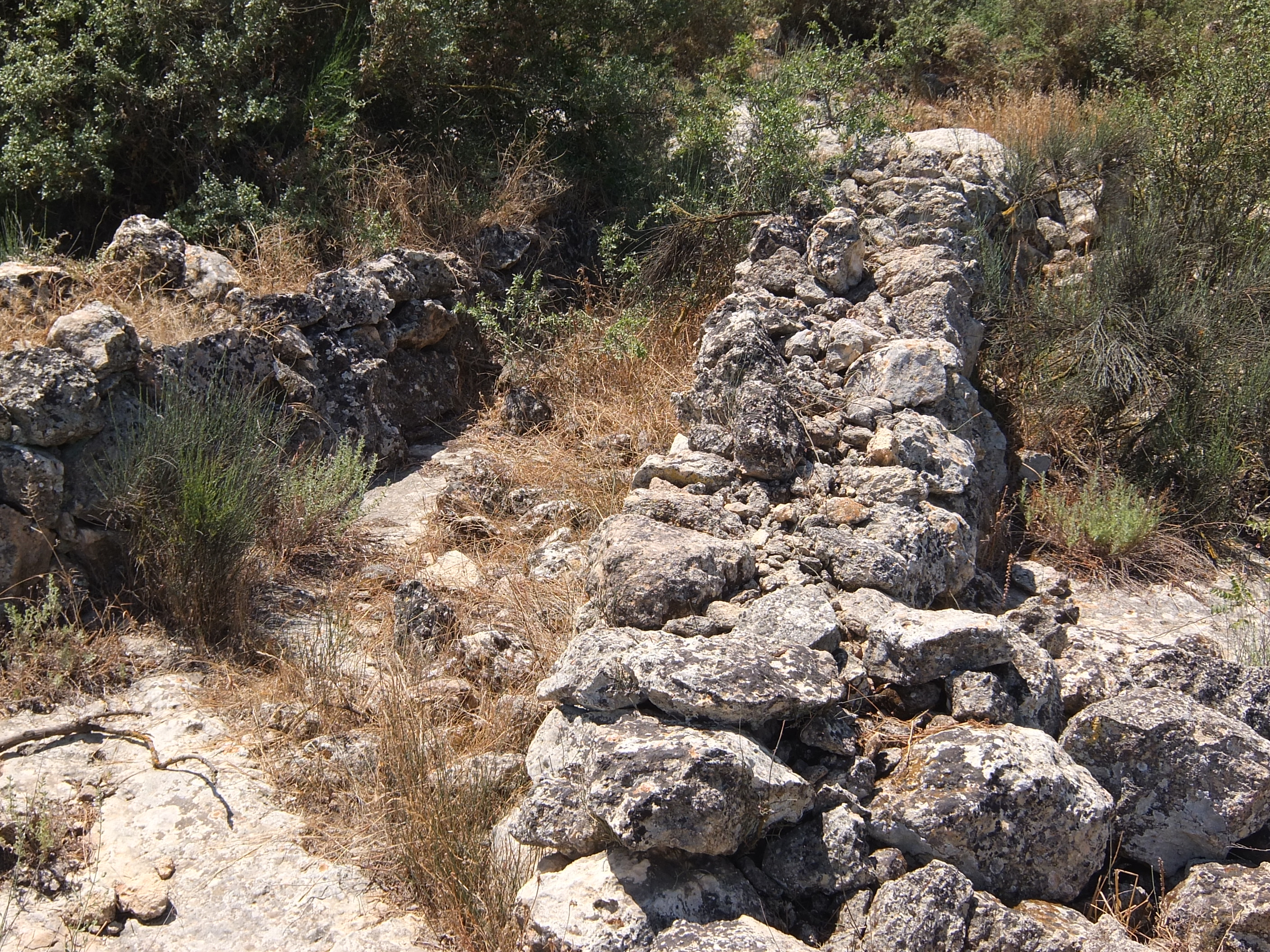
- Remains of stone wall seen near Khirbet Sheikh Ghazy (Chezib of Judah ?)

- Location within Israel
- 31°41′00″N 35°01′01″E
- Periods: Bronze Age, Iron Age, Hellenistic, Roman
- Cultures: Canaanite, Jewish, Greco-Roman
- Location: Israel
- Region: Elah valley
- Grid position: 15125 / 12170 PAL

Site notes
- Condition: Ruin

Chezib, also known as Achzib of Judah (Hebrew: אכזיב; כזיב), is a biblical place-name associated with the birth of Judah's third son, Shelah, corresponding to the Achzib of the Book of Joshua, a town located in the low-lying hills of the plain of Judah known as the Shefela. In 1 Chronicles 4:22, the town is rendered as Chozeba. The town is now a ruin.

== Identification ==
Historical geographers are divided as to the location of Chezib in Judea. While some identify the site as Khirbet a-Sheikh Ghazi, others say that it is to be recognised in the nearby site of Khirbet ʿĒn el-Kizbe (grid position 149/122 PAL). In both cases, the old namesake is preserved in the name of a nearby spring ʻAin el-Kezbeh (ʿĒn el-Kizbe), a place in the Elah Valley near Moshav Aviezer, directly south of Bayt Nattif. According to IAA archaeologists, Zissu and Gass, the location of Khirbet ʿĒn el-Kizbe near the ancient road and the water source by the same name "strongly support identifying this site with ancient Achzib/Chezib/Chozeba," both, on account of the preservation of the ancient name at the water source, and that at its site was found pottery from Iron Age II and the Persian period (including two Royal lmlk jar handles). According to Zissu, the ancient site stretches over an area of approximately eight dunams (nearly 2 acres).

Formerly, the site had tentatively been identified with Tell el-Beide, a site now known as Tel Lavnin, while others placed its location at one of the unidentified ruins near Khirbet Qila and Khirbet Beit Nesib. Archaeologist Boaz Zissu rejects the notion that the site Chezib of Judah could have been Tel Lavnin, saying that "since Khirbet Tell el-Bēḍā / Tel Lavnīn was clearly occupied during the Byzantine Period, it is questionable whether this site is the same as Eusebius’ ruined Chasbi," since Eusebius puts Chezib as a "deserted place" in his days. Like many of the ruins of ancient cities in Israel, the site near Kh. a-Sheikh Ghazi has no very well-defined characteristics, but appears to be spread over a considerable area.

One of the problems of identification is that Achzib is grouped with a list of nine towns in Joshua 15:42–44 which are generally thought to be within relatively close proximity to each other in the low-lying hills (Shefelah) south of the Elah Valley. For this reason, some have proposed that Achzib of Judah be sought for somewhere between Keilah and Mareshah.

== Biblical references ==
Genesis 38:5 states that Judah ("he") was in Chezib when Shelah, his third son, was born. The Septuagint (αὕτη: autē: "she"), and many English translations assert that Judah's wife was in Chezib and that Shelah was born there. Edward D. Andrews argues that the authoritative reading has Judah in Chezib, while the Septuagint version is a variant which focusses on where his wife gave birth.

== Etymology ==
The name Chezib, etymologically, is derived from the word "disappointment," "delusion", "failing" or "lying." In the Aramaic Targum of Pseudo-Yonathan ben Uzziel on Genesis 38:5, as well as in Genesis Rabba (§85), Chezib is rendered as Paskath, said to be the Aramaic equivalent of Chezib ("failing"). Others say that its name is allegedly derived from Shelah's son, Cozeba, who is mentioned in I Chronicles (4:22).

== History ==
The Lachish Letters makes mention of a certain "Beit Achzi[b]" in the Shefelah, the lower stratum of the Judean range, believed to be the Chezib of Judah. Eusebius, in his Onomasticon, notes of the place that "there the sons of Judah were born; now a desolate place, shown in the territory of Eleutheropolis near Adullam."

In classical Hebrew literature, the town is mentioned as being confederate with Pekah the son of Remaliah, the king of the northern tribes of Israel, for which it incurs the divine wrath of the prophet Micah, who uses a play on words to denounce the towns of Maresha, Achzib, and Adullam. Israelite potters are said to have occupied the site during the pre-exilic, late First Temple period. "Sh[eikh] Ghazy" and "ʾAin el Kezbeh" are both shown in the 1880 map published by Conder & Kitchener's Survey of Western Palestine. Today, the sites have mostly been planted over with pine trees by the Jewish National Fund (Keren Kayemet).

=== Site's distinguishing features ===
The site at Khirbet a-Sheikh Ghazi is strewn with the remains of razed buildings, and thick walls that are partially standing and which were constructed of fieldstones. Within the environs of the site is a burial chamber built in the face of a cliff, containing six kokîm (niches) and which, according to C.R. Conder, signifies a Jewish burial place, dating back to a period before the nation became subject to the Western powers of Greece and Rome. The site has revealed archaeological relics dating back to the Iron Age, until as late as the Byzantine period.

== Gallery ==
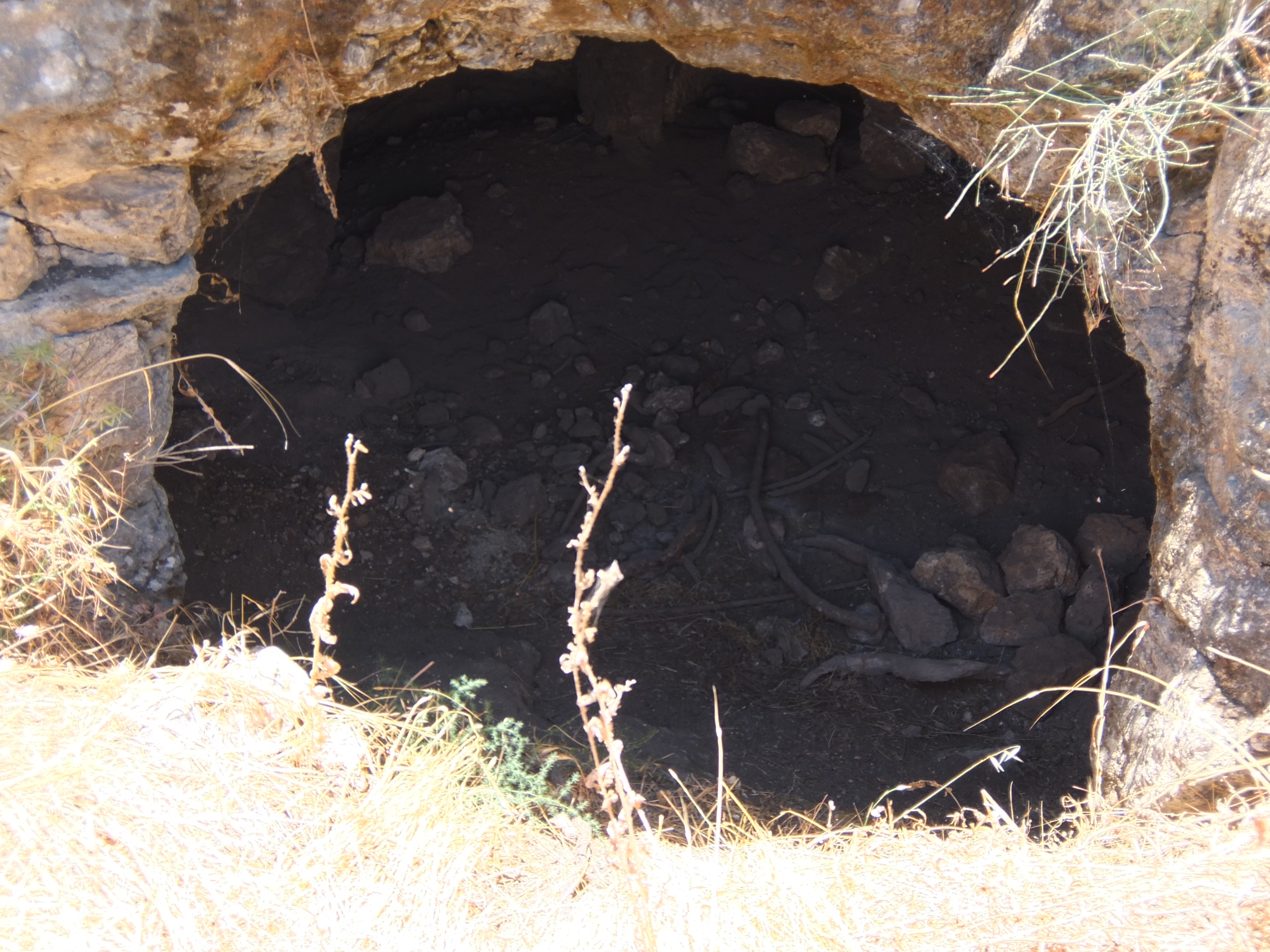
Near Khirbet Ghazy (Chezib of Judah), showing entrance to burial cave

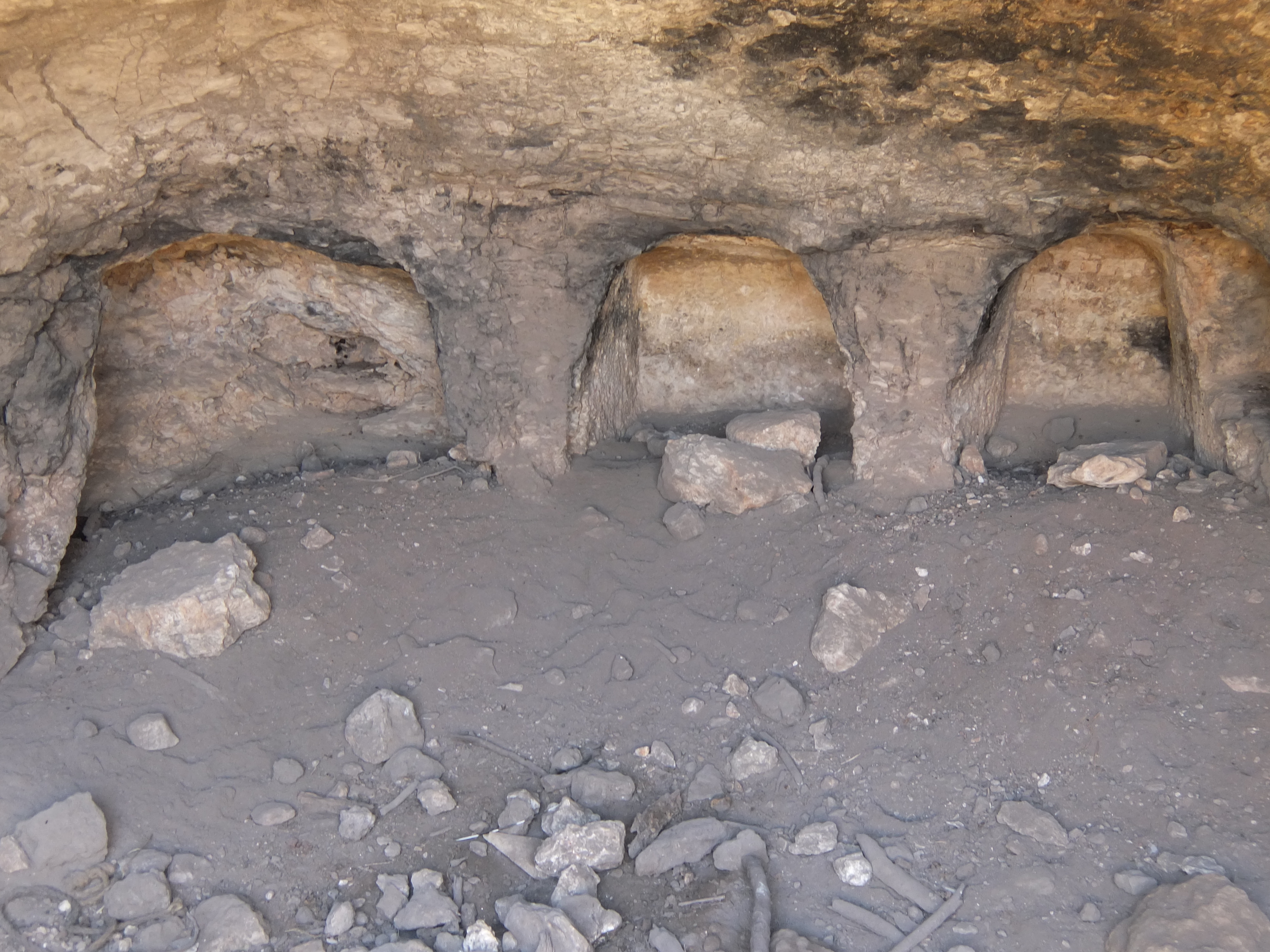
Niches within burial cave near Chezib of Judah (near Khirbet Ghazy)

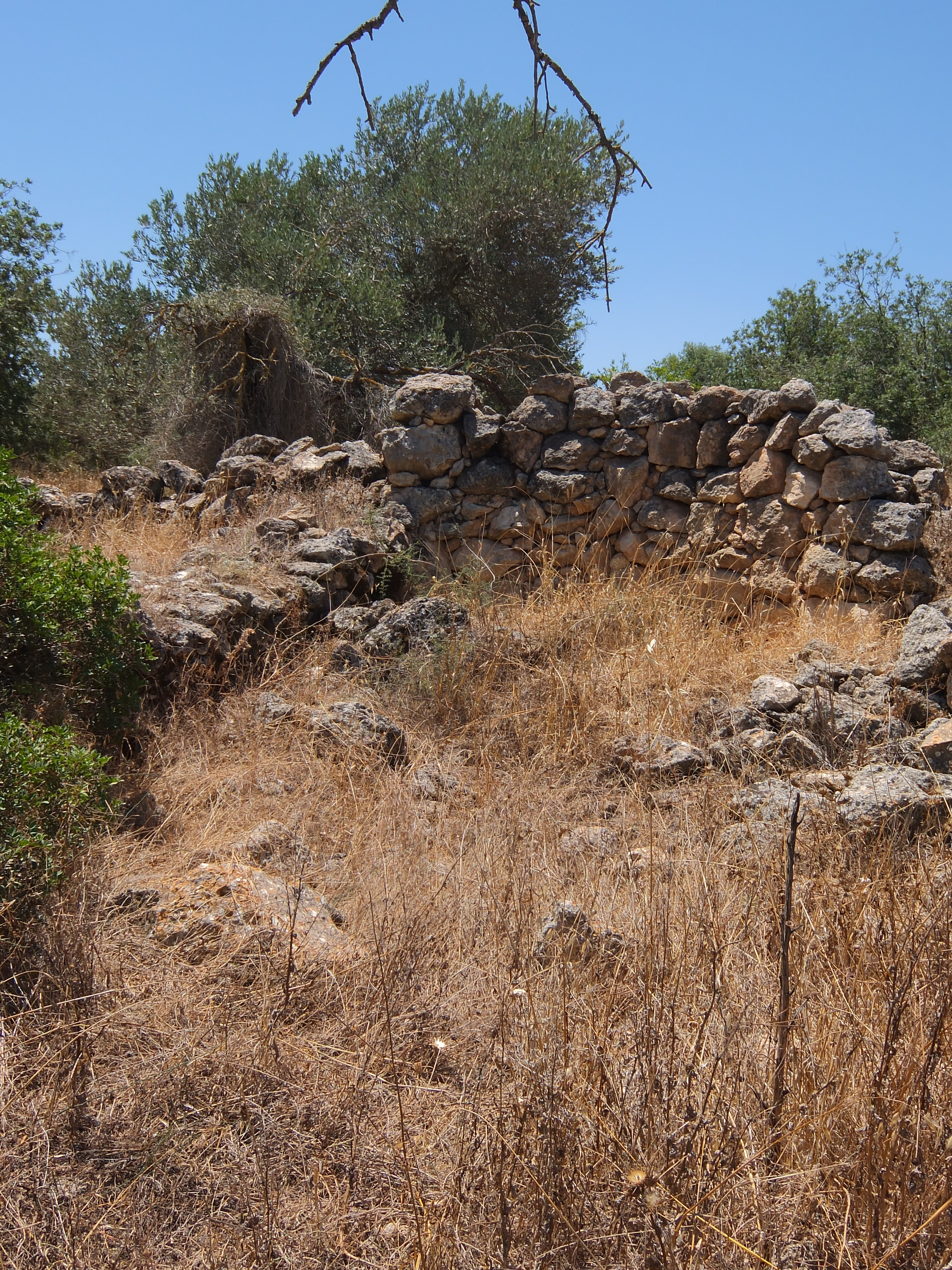
Old ruins near Chezib of Judah

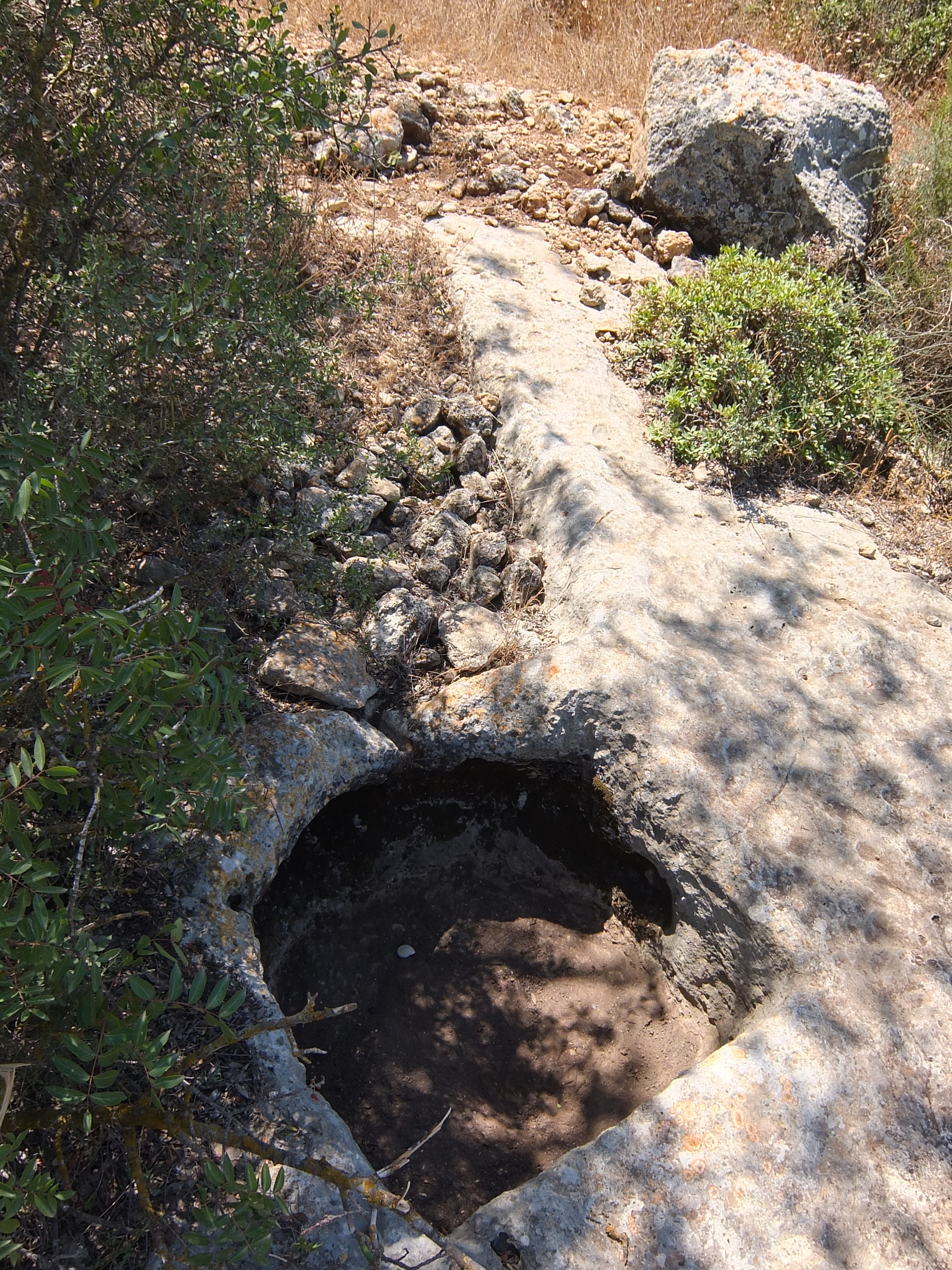
Rock-carved wine vat and press, near the ancient ruin of Chezib of Judah

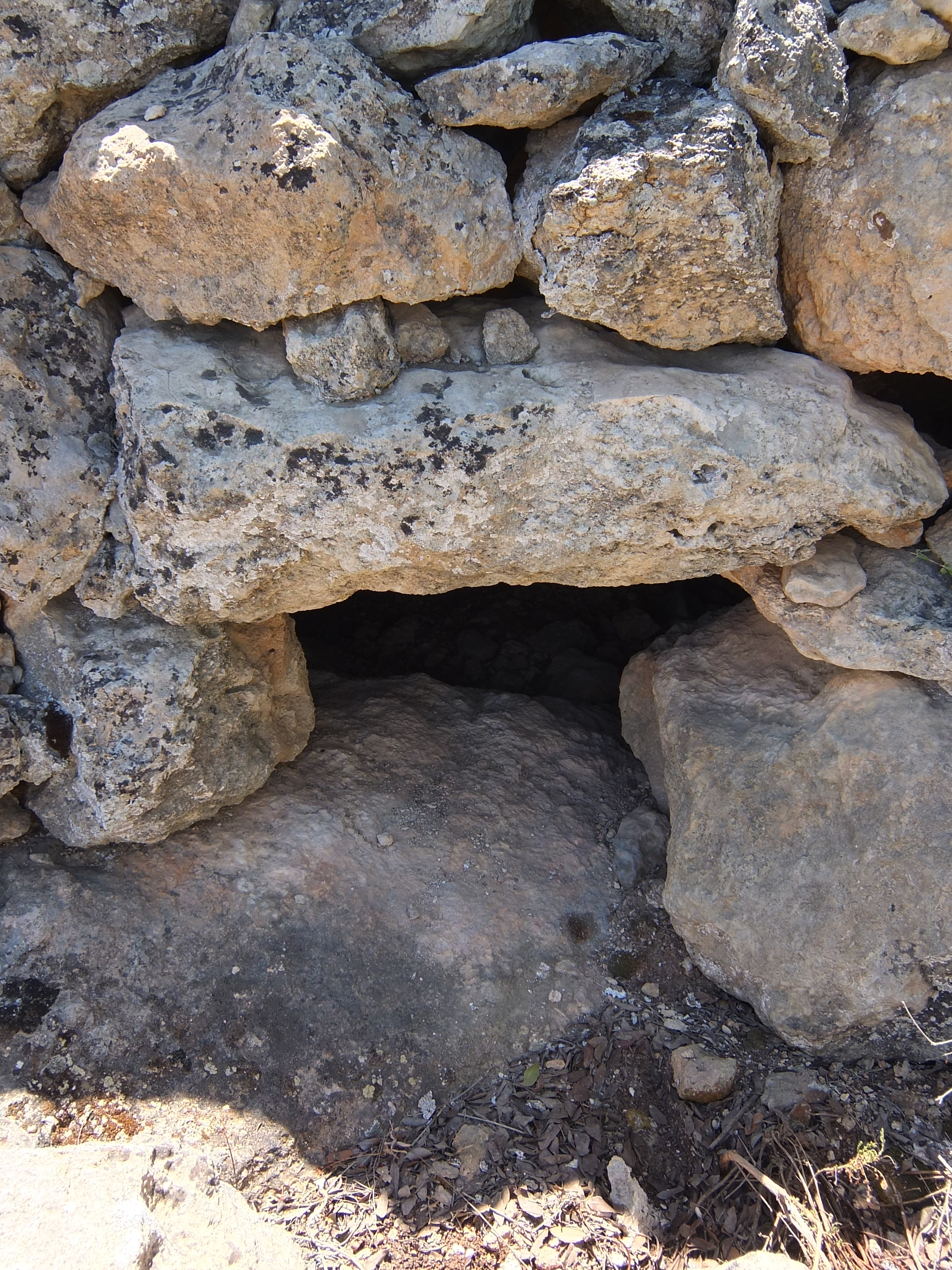
Reused stones near ruin of Chezib

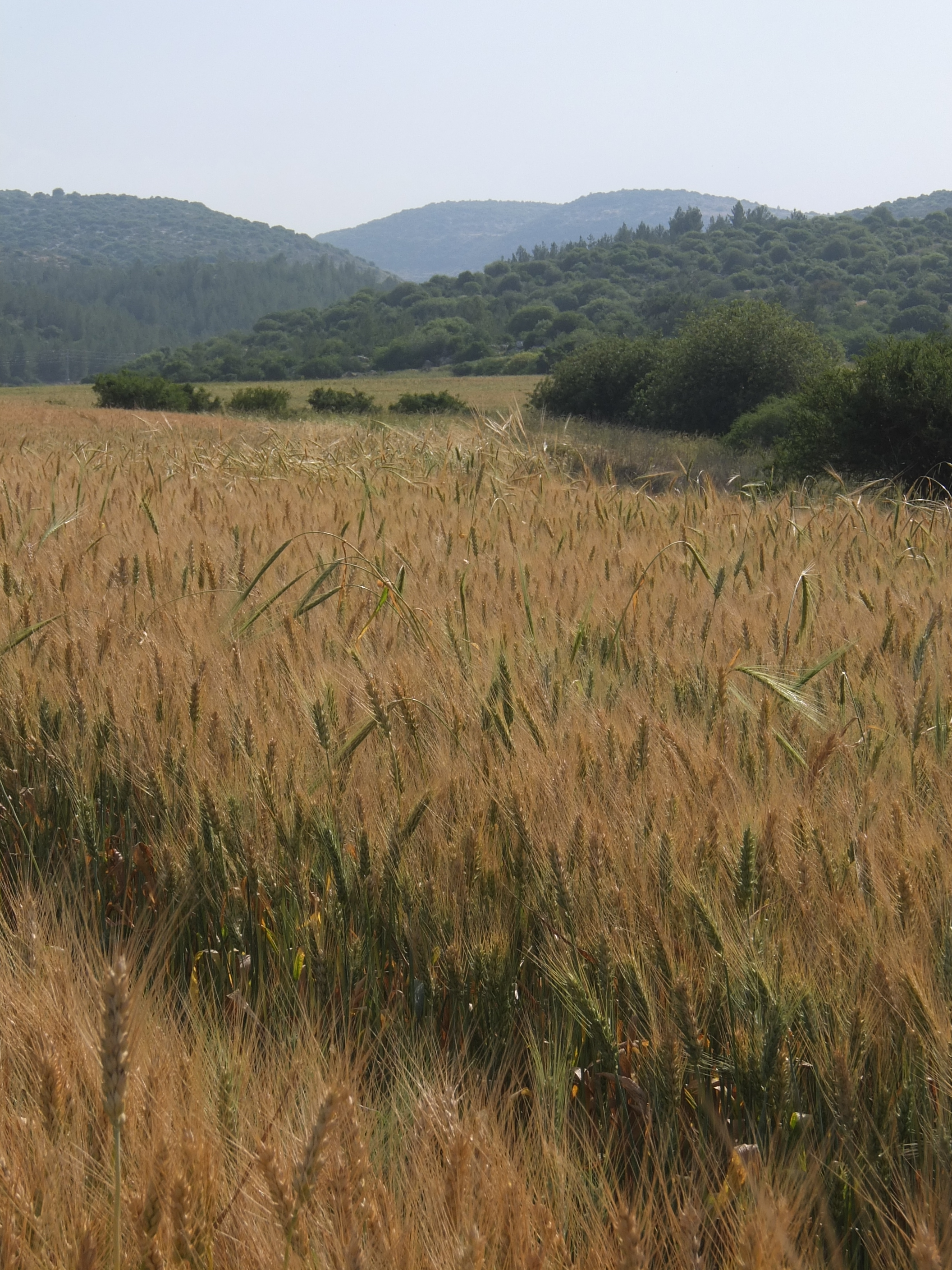
Wheat fields in Elah valley near Chezib

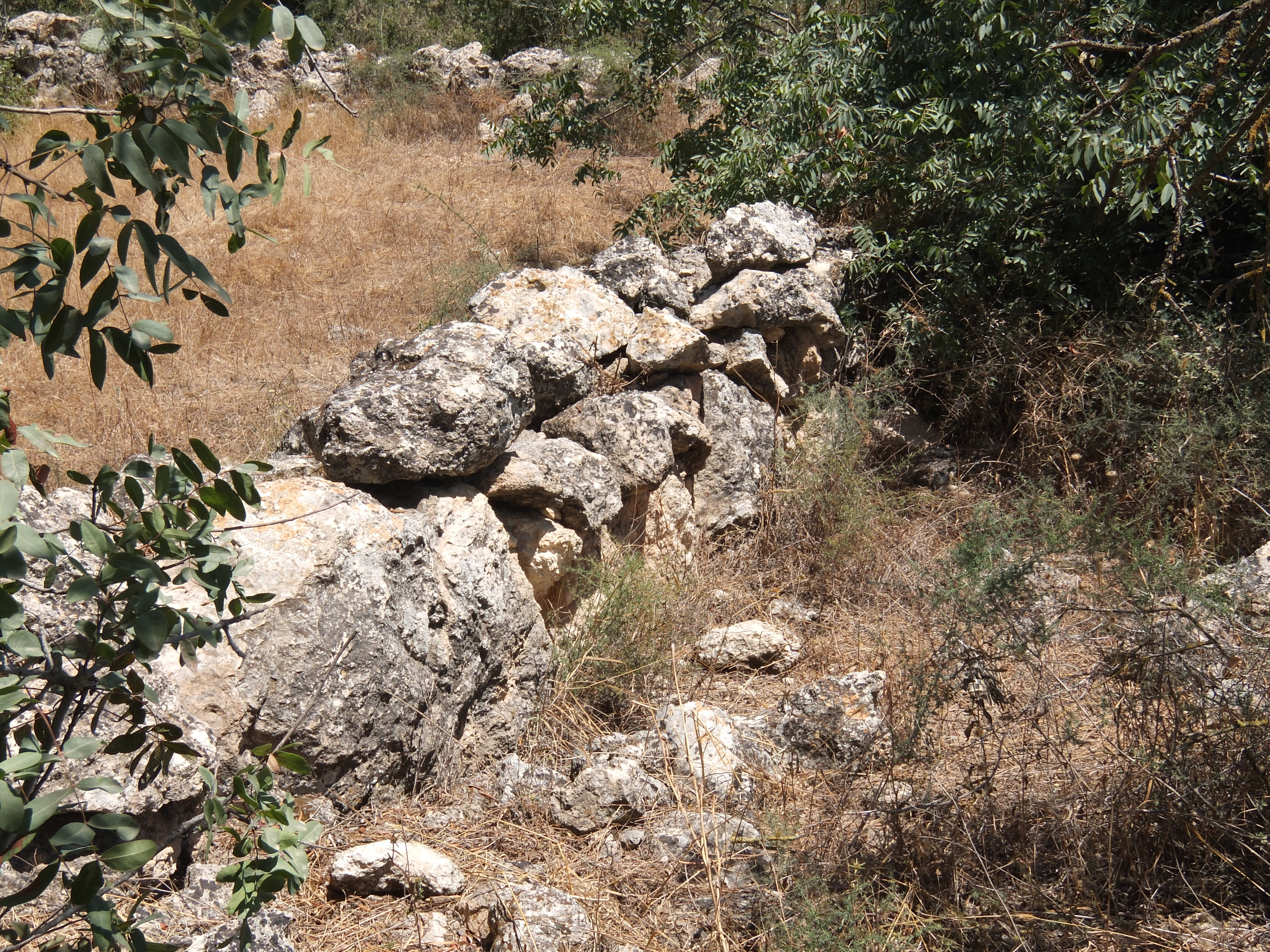
Reused stones that form a wall at Chezib (Achzib) of Judah

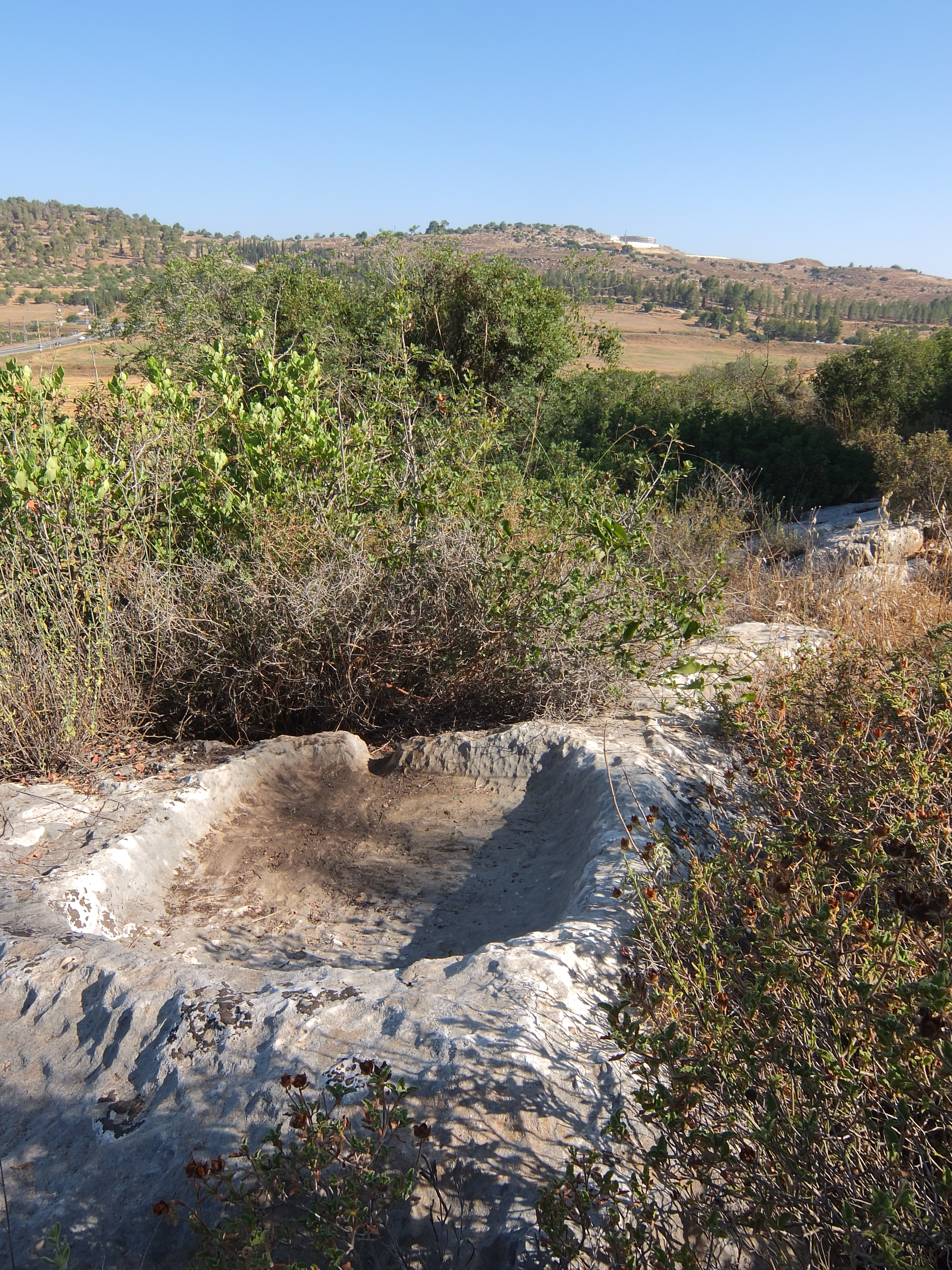
Primitive wine press carved from rock, near Chezib

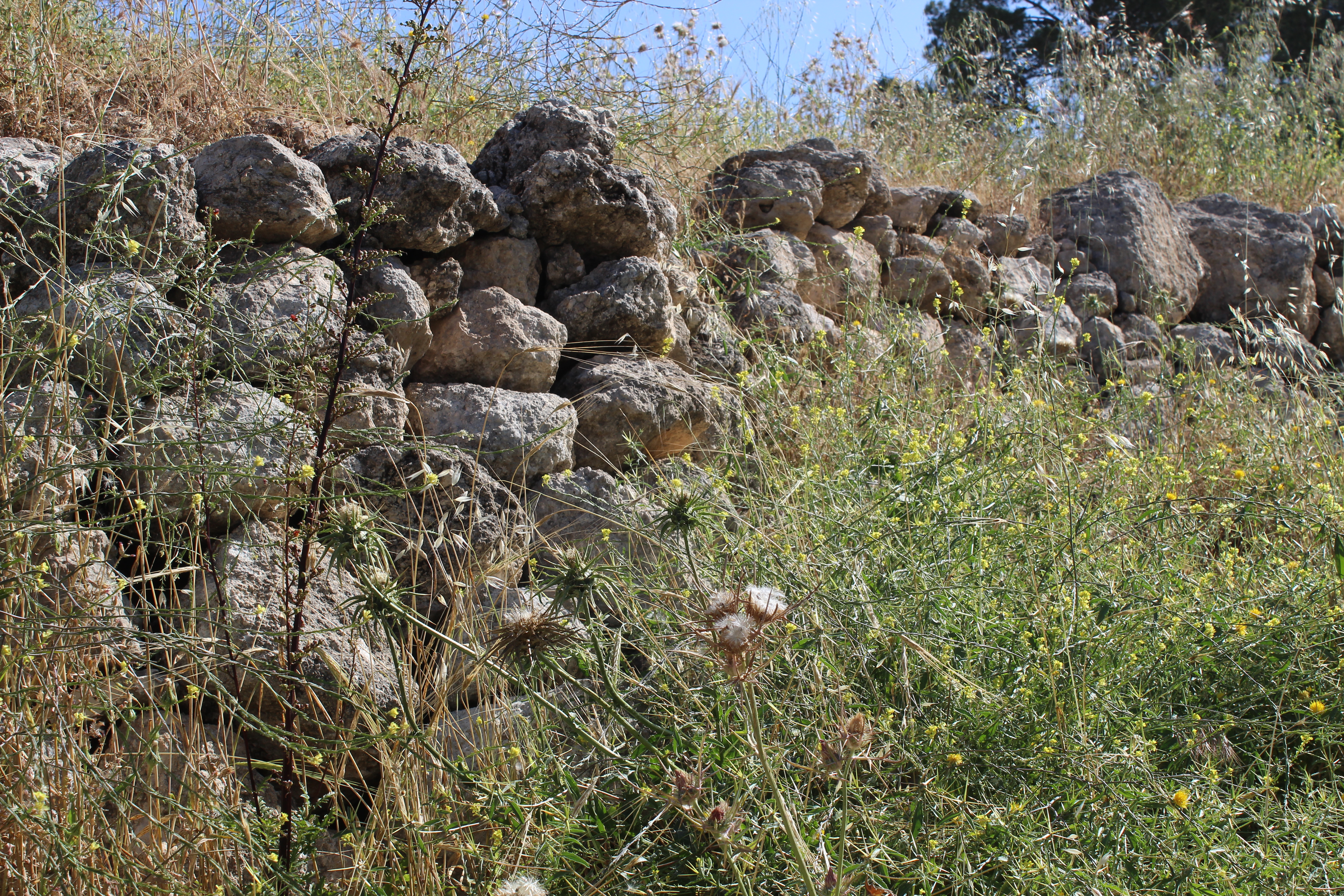
Wall at ruin near En el-Kezbe, near Bayt Nattif

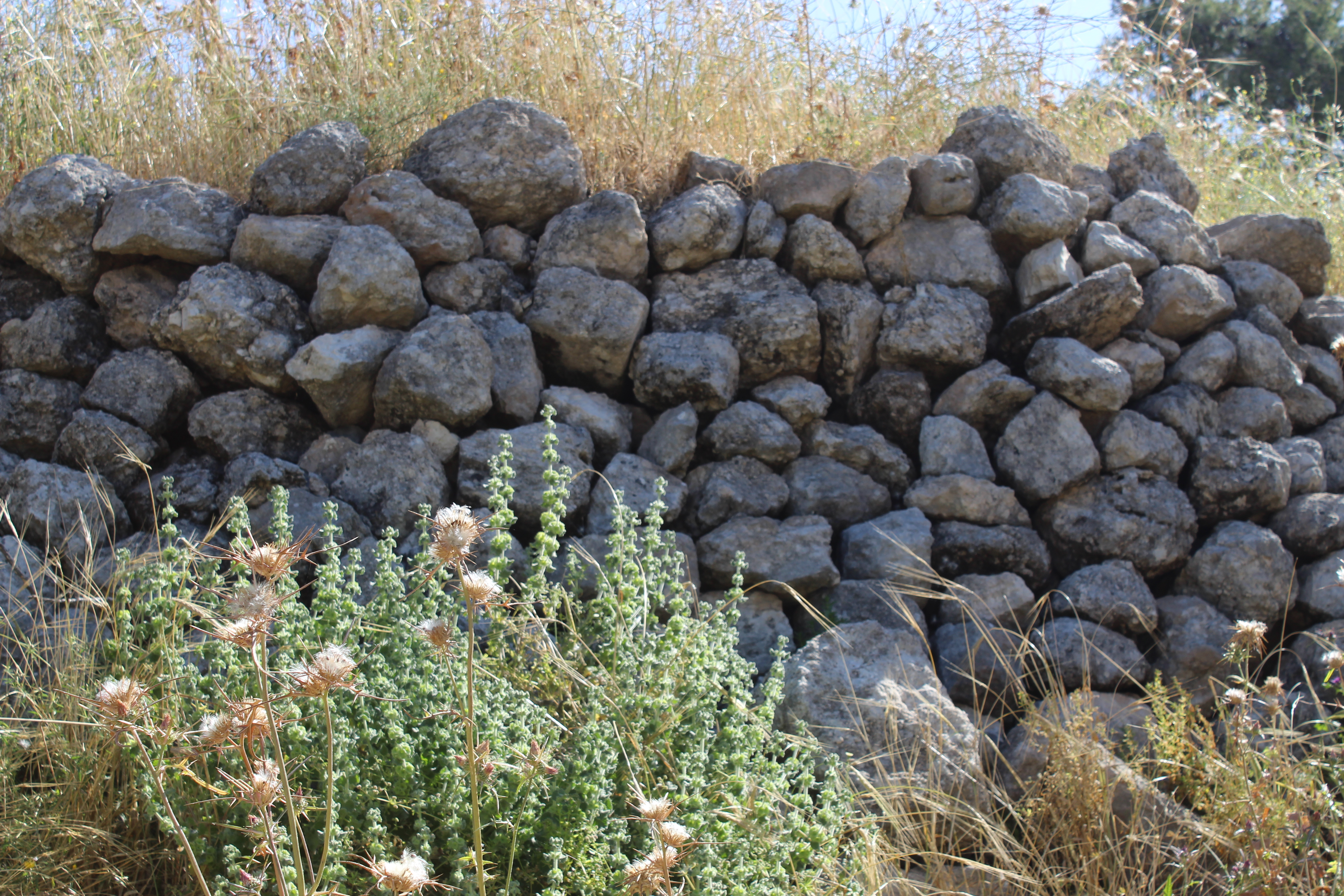
Wall at ruin near En el-Kezbe

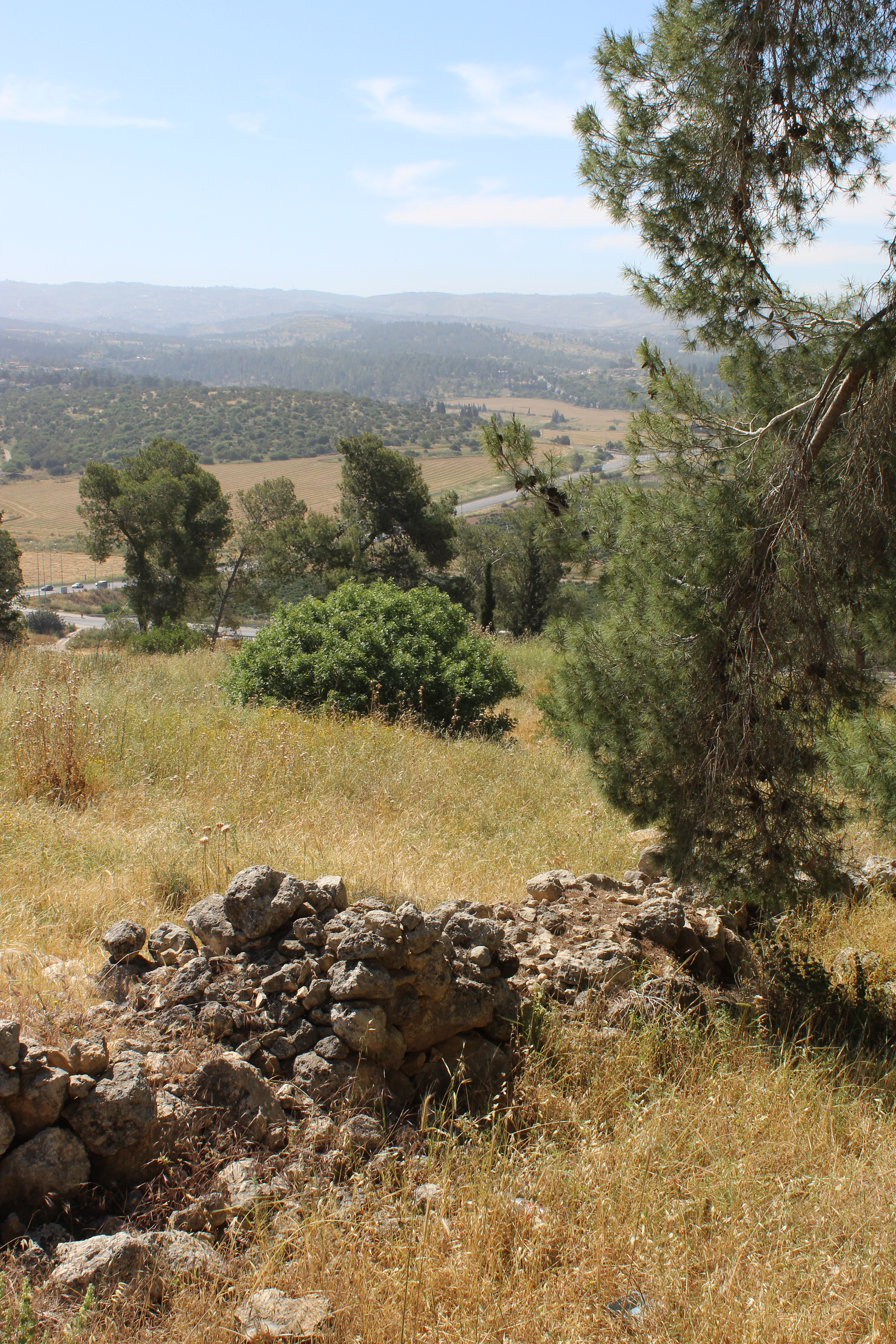
View from ruin near En el-Kezbe, looking south across the Elah Valley

== Bibliography ==
- Abel, F.M. (1933). Géographie de la Palestine. Études bibliques (in French). Vol. 1–2. Paris: Gabalda. (volume 2, 1938)
- Aḥituv, S. [in Hebrew] (1992). Collection of Hebrew Inscriptions. Jerusalem: Bialik Institute.
- Chapmann III, R.L.; Taylor, J.E., eds. (2003). Palestine in the Fourth Century A.D.: The Onomasticon by Eusebius of Caesarea. Translated by G.S.P. Freeman-Grenville. Jerusalem: Carta. ISBN 965-220-500-1. OCLC 937002750.
- Cheyne, T.K. (1898). "Gleanings in Biblical Criticism and Geography". The Jewish Quarterly Review. 10 (4): 565–583. doi:10.2307/1450381. JSTOR 1450381.
- Conder, C.R.; Kitchener, H.H. (1883). The Survey of Western Palestine: Memoirs of the Topography, Orography, Hydrography, and Archaeology. Vol. 3- Judæa. London: Committee of the Palestine Exploration Fund. (Appendix - Notes on the Architecture in Palestine)
- Demsky, A. (1966). "The Houses of Achzib". Israel Exploration Journal. 16 (3): 211–215. JSTOR 27925064.
- Elitzur, Yoel (2004). Ancient Place Names in the Holy Land - Preservation and History. Winona Lake: Bialik Institute. ISBN 1-57506-071-X.
- Elliger, Karl (1934). "Studien aus dem Deutschen Evang. Institut für Altertumswissenschaft des Heiligen Landes. 44. Die Heimat des Propheten Micha". Zeitschrift des Deutschen Palästina-Vereins. 57 (2): 81–152. JSTOR i27930060.
- Encyclopedia of the Bible : A Treasure of Information related to the Bible and its period - Additions and Emendations, vol. 1, Jerusalem: Bialik Institute, 1956 (Hebrew)
- Lemaire, André (1977). Inscriptions Hébraïques (in French). Vol. 1. Paris: Les Ostraca.
- Ne'eman, Pinhas, ed. (1963–1966), "כזיב", Encyclopedia of Biblical Geography, Tel Aviv: Yehoshua Tchechik
- Negev, Avraham; Gibson, Shimon (2001). Archaeological Encyclopedia of the Holy Land. New York. ISBN 0-8264-1316-1.
- Notley, R. Steven; Safrai, Z. (2005). Eusebius, Onomasticon - The Place Names of Divine Scripture. Leiden: Brill. ISBN 0-391-04217-3.
- Palmer, E.H. (1881). The Survey of Western Palestine: Arabic and English Name Lists Collected During the Survey by Lieutenants Conder and Kitchener, R. E. Transliterated and Explained by E.H. Palmer. Committee of the Palestine Exploration Fund.
- Press, I., ed. (1951), "Achzib / Chezib", A Topographical-Historical Encyclopaedia of Palestine, vol. 1 (2nd ed.), Jerusalem: Rubin Mass
- Rainey, A.F. (1983). "The Biblical Shephelah of Judah". Bulletin of the American Schools of Oriental Research (251): 1–22. doi:10.2307/1356823. JSTOR 1356823. S2CID 163604987.
- Saarisalo, Aapeli (1930). "Topographical Researches in the Shephelah". The Journal of the Palestine Oriental Society. XI.
- Smith, G.A.; Bartholomew, J.B. (1915). Atlas of the Historical Geography of the Holy Land. London: Hodder and Stoughton. OCLC 473834026.
- Thomsen, Peter (1966). Loca Sancta. Hildesheim. (Leipzig 1907)
- Yeivin, S. (1940). "The late Professor Rabbi Samuel Klein". Bulletin of the Jewish Palestine Exploration Society. 7 (3/4): I–IV. JSTOR 23724427.
- Zissu, Boaz [in Hebrew]; Gass, Erasmus (2011), "The Identification of Biblical Achzib at Khirbet ʿĒn el-Kizbe in the Judean Shephelah, and the Origins of Shimon Bar Kokhba", 'Go Out and Study the Land' (Judges 18:2), Leiden: Brill, doi:10.1163/9789004214132_023, ISBN 9789004214132
