= Judah and Tamar =

Painting by Horace Vernet

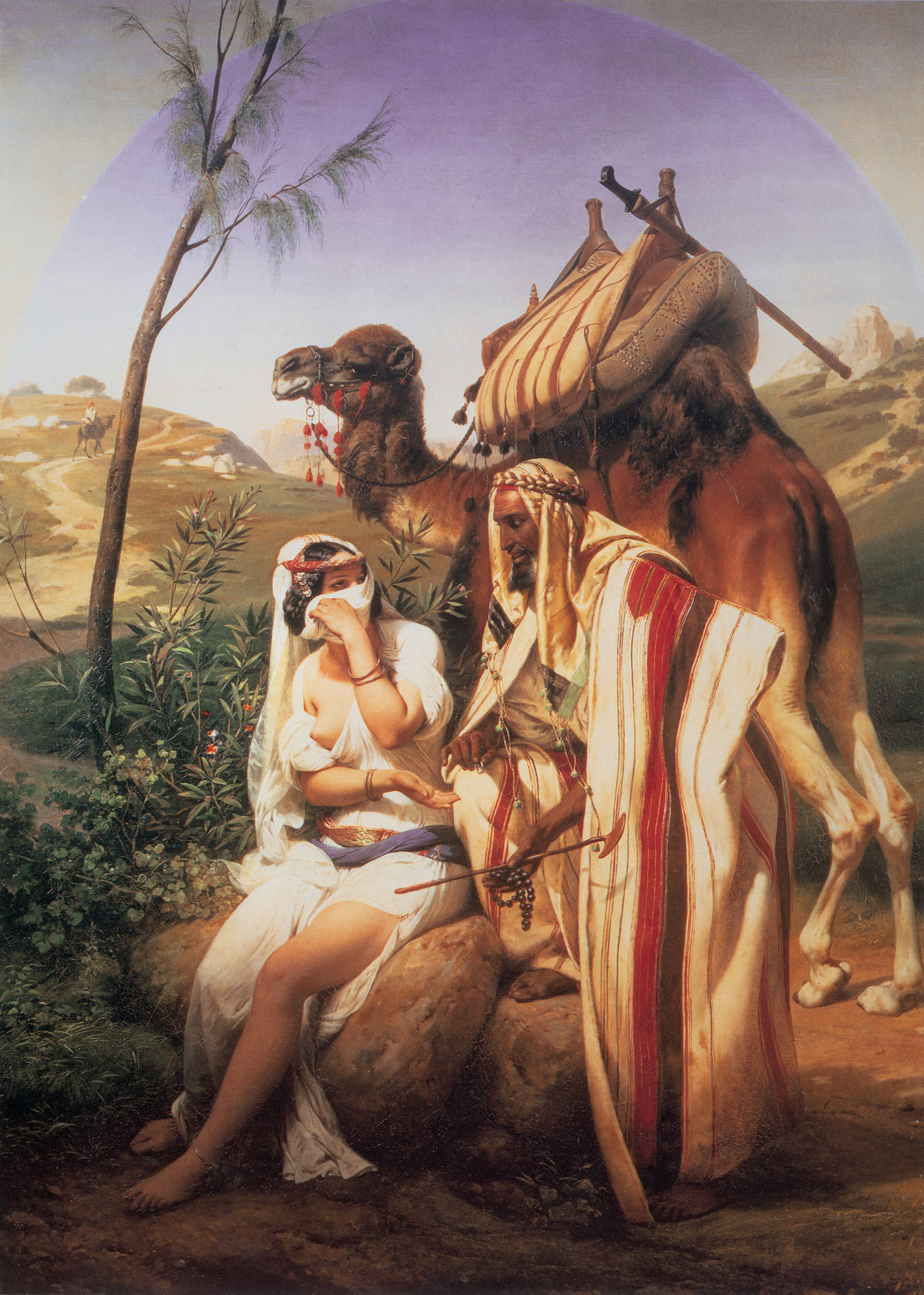
- Artist: Horace Vernet
- Year: 1840
- Type: Oil on canvas
- Dimensions: 129 cm × 97.5 cm (51 in × 38.4 in)
- Location: Wallace Collection, London

Judah and Tamar is an 1840 oil painting by the French artist Horace Vernet. It portrays a biblical scene featuring the widowed Tamar, who seduces her father-in-law Judah while disguised as a prostitute.

Vernet exhibited the work at the Salon of 1843 at the Louvre in Paris. Today it is in the Wallace Collection in London, having been acquired by Marquess of Hertford in 1865.

== Bibliography ==
- Duffy, Stephen, The Wallace Collection. Scala, 2005.
- Ingamells, John, The Wallace Collection: French Nineteenth Century. Trustees of the Wallace Collection, 1985.
- Harkett, Daniel & Hornstein, Katie (ed.), Horace Vernet and the Thresholds of Nineteenth-Century Visual Culture. Dartmouth College Press, 2017.
- Rendall, Jane and Mendus, Sarah, Sexuality and Subordination: Interdisciplinary Studies of Gender in the Nineteenth Century. Taylor & Francis, 2002.
