= Tamar (Genesis) =

Biblical figure and daughter-in-law of Judah

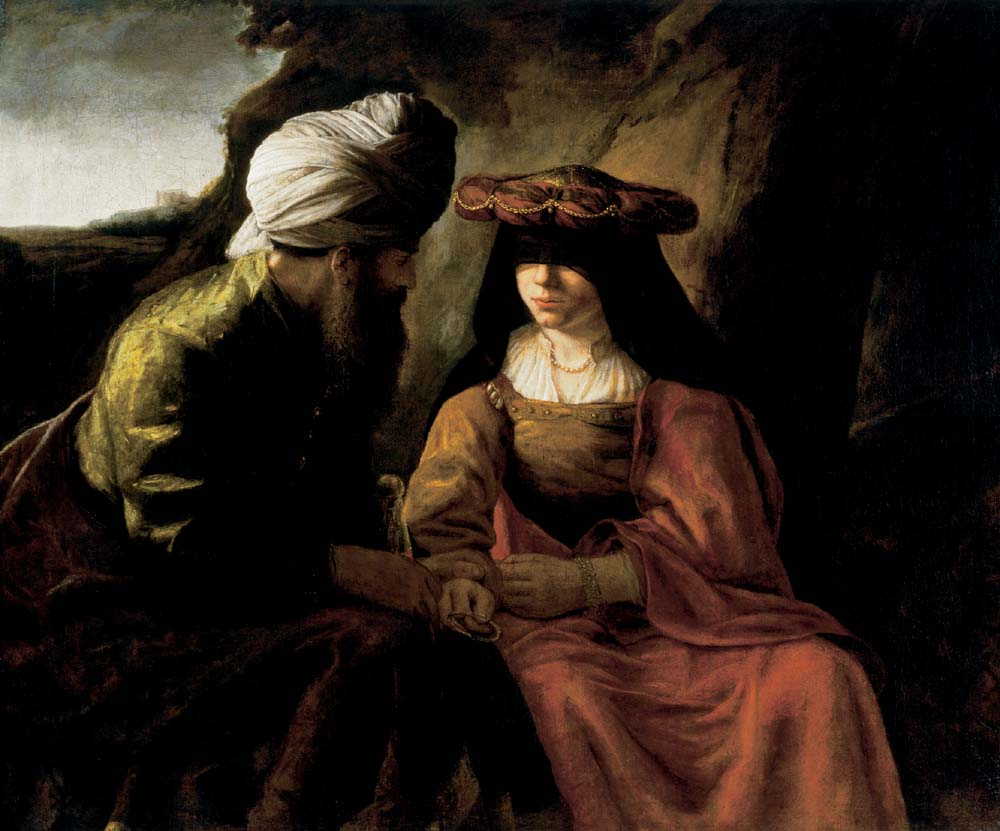
Judah and Tamar, school of Rembrandt

In the Book of Genesis, Tamar (/ˈteɪmər/; Hebrew: תָּמָר, Modern: Tamar pronounced [taˈmaʁ], Tiberian: Tāmār pronounced [tʰɔːˈmɔːr], date palm) was the daughter-in-law of Judah (twice), as well as the mother of two of his children: the twins Perez and Zerah. Her cunning action in preserving Judah's lineage forms the centerpiece of the narrative of Genesis 38.

== Genesis narrative ==
=== Tamar's early marriages ===
In Genesis chapter 38, Tamar is first described as marrying Judah's eldest son, Er. Because of his unidentified wickedness, Er was killed by God. By way of a levirate union, Judah asked his second son, Onan, to provide offspring for Tamar so that the family line might continue. This could have substantial economic repercussions, with any son born deemed the heir of the deceased Er, and able to claim the firstborn's double share of inheritance. However, if Er was childless, Onan would inherit as the oldest surviving son.

Onan performed coitus interruptus. His action displeased God and so, like his older brother, God killed him. At this point, Judah is portrayed as viewing Tamar to be cursed and therefore as being reluctant to give her his remaining and youngest son Shelah. Rather, he tells Tamar to wait for Shelah. However, even after Shelah has grown up, Judah still does not give Tamar to him in marriage.

=== Judah and Tamar ===
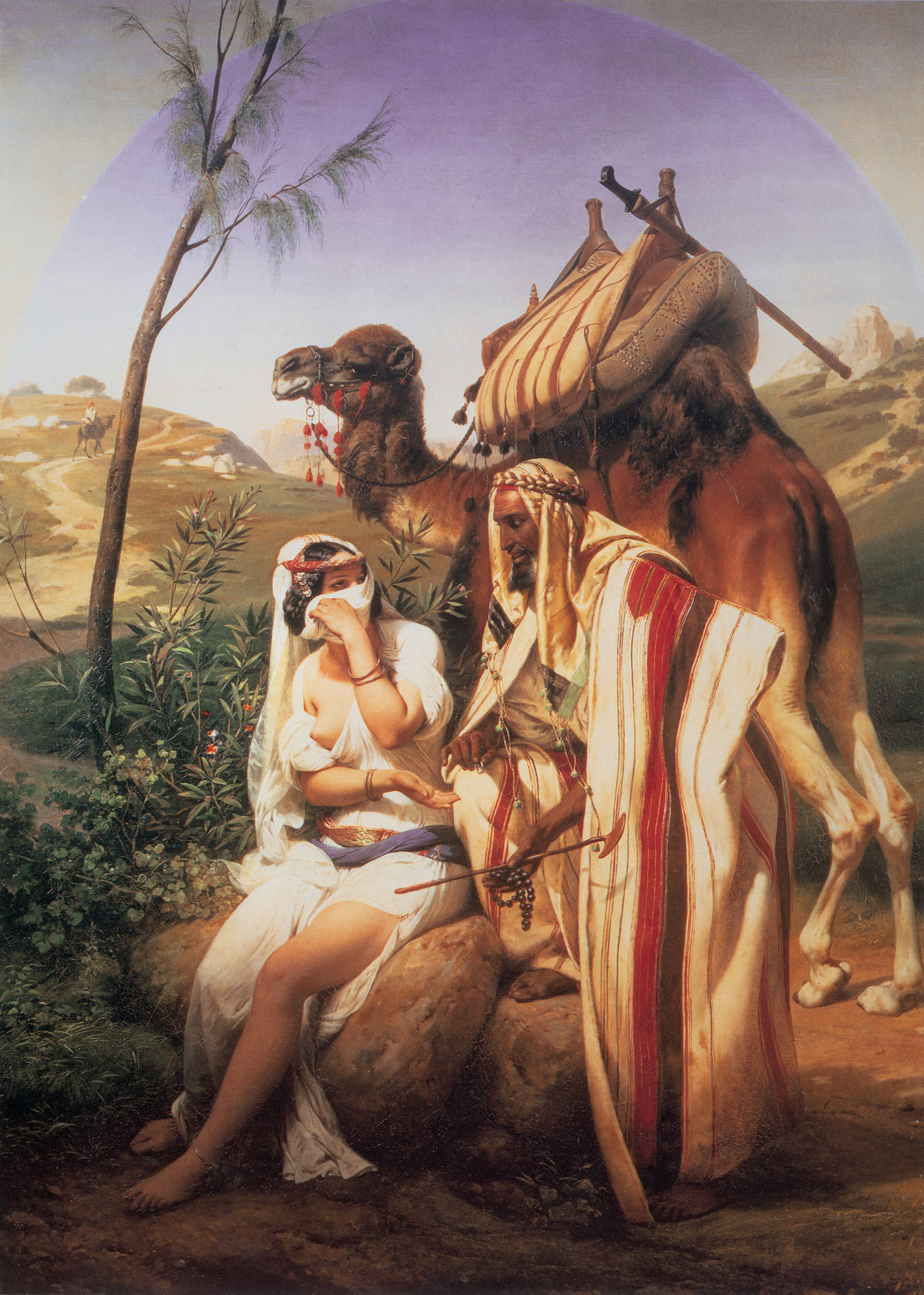
Judah and Tamar by Horace Vernet, 1840

After Shelah had grown up, Judah became a widower. After Judah mourned the death of his wife, he planned on going to Timnath to shear his sheep. Upon hearing this news, Tamar disguised herself as a prostitute and immediately went to Enaim, which was en route to Judah's destination. Upon arriving at a place where two roads met, Judah saw the woman but did not recognize her as Tamar because of the veil she wore over her face. Thinking she was a prostitute, he requested her services. Tamar's plan was to become pregnant by this ruse so that she might bear a child in Judah's line, since Judah had not given her to his son Shelah. So she played the part of a prostitute and struck a bargain with Judah for a goat, secured by his staff, seal, and cord. When Judah was able to have a goat sent to Timnath, in order to collect his staff, seal, and cord, the woman was nowhere to be found and no one knew of any prostitute in Timnath.

Three months later, Tamar was reported to Judah by family members to be pregnant. Upon hearing this news, Judah ordered that she be burned to death. Tamar sent the staff, seal, and cord to Judah with a message declaring that the owner of these items was the man who had made her pregnant. Upon recognizing these items as his security, Judah released Tamar from her sentence. Judah praised Tamar's righteousness as exceeding his own, and he had no further sexual relations with her.

Tamar gave birth to twins, Perez and Zerah. Their birth is reminiscent of the birth of Rebekah's twin sons. The midwife marks Zerah's hand with a scarlet cord when his hand emerges first from the womb, although Perez is actually born first.

== Later narratives ==
Perez is identified in the Book of Ruth as the ancestor of King David. According to Ethiopic tradition, Perez became the king of Persia.

In the New Testament, Matthew 1:3 recalls that "Judah was the father of Perez and Zerah, with Tamar being their mother", and the generations that follow ultimately lead to "Jacob the father of Joseph, the husband of Mary, ... the mother of Jesus who is called the Messiah".

== Narrative criticism ==
Literary critics have focused on the relationship between the Judah story in chapter 38 and the Joseph story in chapters 37 and 39. Victor P. Hamilton notes some "intentional literary parallels" between the chapters, such as the exhortation to "identify" (38:25–26 and 37:32–33). John Emerton regards the connections as evidence for including chapter 38 in the J corpus, and suggests that the J writer dovetailed the Joseph and Judah traditions. Derek Kidner points out that the insertion of chapter 38 "creates suspense for the reader", but Robert Alter goes further and suggests it is a result of the "brilliant splicing of sources by a literary artist." He notes that the same verb "identify” will play "a crucial thematic role in the dénouement of the Joseph story when he confronts his brothers in Egypt, he recognizing them, they failing to recognize him."

Emerton also suggests that the Judah and Tamar narrative contains "aetiological motifs concerned with the eponymous ancestors of the clans of Judah". He notes that Dillman and Noth considered the account of the deaths of Er and Onan to "reflect the dying out of two clans of Judah bearing their names, or at least of their failure to maintain a separate existence". However, this view was "trenchantly criticized" by Thomas L. Thompson.

Along with the account of Lot and his daughters, Tamar and Judah is one of two instances of sperm stealing in the Bible, in which a woman seduces a male relative under false pretenses in order to become pregnant. Each case involves a direct ancestor of King David.

== Religious interpretations ==
=== Jewish views ===
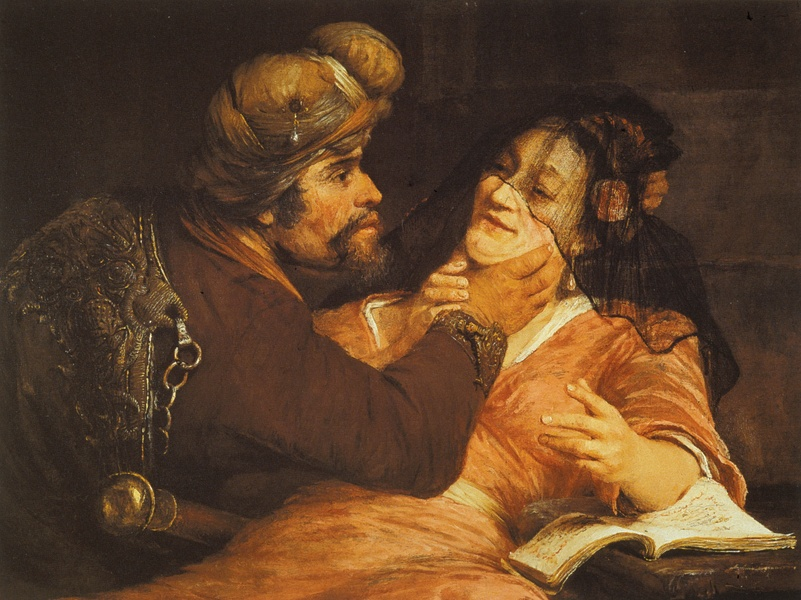
Aert de Gelder, Tamar and Judah, 1667

According to the Talmud, Judah's confession of guilt itself atoned for some of his prior faults, and resulted in his being divinely rewarded by a share in the future world. The Talmud also suggests that Tamar's actions were for the purpose of avoiding Judah's humiliation, although the Genesis Rabbah portrays her as boastful and unashamed in regard to the pregnancy itself.

Both the Genesis Rabbah and Talmud state that Tamar was an Israelite, and that Judah ended up marrying her and had further sexual liaisons with her as a result.

However, some argue that Tamar was Canaanite, since her father's residence was not implied to be outside of Canaan. She is also theorized to be the daughter of Melchizedek. One reason includes Judah prescribing a penalty similar to the one in Leviticus 21:9 against Tamar. In addition, Melchizedek was the only Canaanite priest who worshiped the "one true God".

Frymer-Kensky finds Tamar's traits of assertiveness in action, willingness to be unconventional, and deep loyalty to family to be qualities that distinguish her descendant, King David.

According to Legends of the Jews, Tamar was endowed with a prophetic gift which allowed her to know the future of her descendants. From this gift, she knew that she would be the ancestress of royal line of David and mighty prophets. While she was standing at gates of Timnath and wearing a veil; Judah, who was intoxicated from wine that twisted his understanding away, came to her. After that, he left her with three symbolical pledges; his staff, the stay of Tribe of Judah; his mantle, representation of his strength; and his signet-diadem, the glory of kingdom of Judah. When her state became known, Tamar was dragged before the court, in which Isaac, Jacob, and Judah were the judges.

As a judge, Judah gave a decision that Tamar was liable to the death penalty by burning according to the law, for she was the daughter of the high priest (Shem) who was accused of leading an unchaste demeanor. After Tamar showed the three pledges from the man who came to her, Judah's countenance grew pale to green color when he publicly confessed his carnal relationship with her.

=== Christian views ===
According to the Gospel of Matthew, Judah and Tamar are ancestors of Jesus through their son Perez.

H. E. Ryle notes that in the events of this story, "we may discern a reminiscence of a time in which the clans of Er and Onan disappeared from the tribe of Judah, while those of Perez and Zerah, connected with native Canaanites, became incorporated with it, but were rivals with one another, Zerah, though the more ancient, being obliged to yield to the greater vigour of Perez. Ryle observes also that the story may serve "a subordinate object, in the record of the tradition of a pre-Mosaic origin for the institution of the levirate marriage".

== Chronological issues ==
Together with the brief preceding narrative of the birth of Er, Onan, and Shelah, and the subsequent narrative of the birth of Perez's children, the passage is often regarded as presenting a significant chronological issue, since it is surrounded by a narrative concerning Joseph; before the passage occurs, Joseph is described as being 17 years old, and after the passage, Joseph is described as meeting up with Judah 9 years after Joseph reached 30 years of age.

The gap, a maximum of 22 years, is exceedingly compressed to contain within it Judah's first marriage, the birth of Er and Onan, Er's marriage to Tamar, Onan's subsequent marriage to Tamar, the delay of an unspecified number of years for Shelah to grow to marriageable age, Judah's further delay in not giving Tamar in marriage to Shelah, Tamar's decision to trick Judah and subsequent pregnancy by him, and the birth of Judah's children by his daughter-in-law, Tamar; the passage is also widely regarded as an abrupt change to the surrounding narrative of Joseph's story. A further moral and theological complication is that one must then conclude that God imposed summary execution upon Er and Onan when they were teenagers, while passing no judgment whatsoever upon Judah's transgressions, despite him being nearly a middle-aged adult by the time of his encounter with Tamar. According to some textual scholars, the reason for these features is that the passage derives from the Jahwist source, while the immediately surrounding narrative is from the Elohist, the two being spliced together at a later date.

The Jamieson-Fausset-Brown Bible Commentary proposes that Judah was about 20 years old when he settled in Adullam and that his sons, Er and Onan, were 17 years old when they married. The sons of Hezron and Hamul were considered to be part of Jacob's family that moved to Egypt since they were born there.

== Family tree ==
Judah	Daughter of Shuah
Er	Tamar	Onan	Shelah
Perez and Zerah (twins)

== See also ==
- Vayeshev
