= Shelah (son of Judah) =

Biblical figure; third son of Judah

According to the Bible, Shelah/Shela (Hebrew: שֵׁלָה, Modern: Šela, Tiberian: Šēlā, meaning "petition") was the third son of Judah, and was born at Chezib, which can be identified with an unknown town in the vicinity of Mareshah.

== Biblical narrative ==
According to the Book of Genesis, God had Shelah's two older brothers, Er and Onan, put to death. After Er dies, Onan had married his widow, Tamar, in accordance with the rule later embodied in the Torah as Yibbum, but Shelah was reported to be too young after Onan's death to have taken on the duty of marrying their widow, so Judah sends Tamar back to her family home pending Shelah's growth to adulthood. Tamar was probably a Canaanite,, although Johann Peter Lange thinks that she may have been of Philistine descent. The text notes also that Judah was unwilling to allow Tamar to be married to Shelah because she might be cursed and Shelah might die if married to her. When in due course Shelah came of age, Judah neglected to marry him to Tamar. The narrative which follows refers to Judah's later encounter with Tamar, who he treats as a prostitute.

In the Book of Chronicles, Shelah is identified as the name of a clan, containing a subclan named Er. According 1 Chronicles 4:21–23, the sons of Shelah were:

1. Er, the father of Lecah
2. Laadah, the father of Mareshah.
3. The families of the house of the linen workers of the house of Ashbea
4. Jokim, the men of Chozeba
5. Joash
6. Saraph
7. Jashubi-Lehem

The descendants of the last four sons were potters who dwelt at Netaim and Gederah and worked for the king.

== Interpretation ==
According to some biblical scholars, the description of Shelah is an eponymous aetiological myth concerning fluctuations in the constituency of the tribe of Judah, with Shelah representing the newest clan to become part of the tribe. The description of Er as a descendant of Shelah in the Book of Chronicles suggests that Er was in reality the name of a clan that was originally equal in status to the Shelah clan, but was later subsumed by it.

Professor Aaron Demsky argues that the genealogy of Shelah is an allegory of the history of Shelanite clans in Shephelah (i.e. Judean foothills). Remnants of the Er clan joined the Shelanites and founded the city of Lecah, which was the alternative name for Lachish. Later, the Laadah clan founded Mareshah, a town of secondary importance to Lachish. The families of Beth Asheba lived in a town of the same name and produced clothing for the priesthood and aristocracy, using byssus cloth. The Jokim clan founded Chozeba, which was synonymous with the Chezib near Mareshah. The Joash and Saraph clans lived with the Moabites. The last Shelanite clans to emerge consisted of the residents of Lahem or Lahmas. The last four clans worked for the king, who was most likely Hezekiah.

In 701 BC, Sennacherib destroyed important Shelanite cities. Survivors fled to Jerusalem and assimilated with the local populace after the return of Babylonian exiles in c.a. 538 BC. According to Demsky, the author of the Book of Chronicles considered the Shelanite clans to be inferior to other Judahite clans, based on their positioning in the biblical text.

Scholars have argued that the Tamar and Shelah narrative has a secondary role in either promoting the institution of levirate marriage, or presenting an aetiological myth for its origin; Shelah's role in the narrative would thus be as the example of a brother refusing to perform levirate marriage. John Emerton regards the evidence for this as inconclusive, though classical rabbinical writers argued that this narrative concerns the origin of levirate marriage.

== Family trees ==
=== Shelah and his relatives ===
Judah	Daughter of Shuah
Er	Tamar	Onan	Shelah
Perez and Zerah (twins)

=== Shelah and his descendants ===
		Shelah
(descendant); Er	(descendant); Laadah	(descendant); Jokim	(descendant); Joash	(descendant); Saraph
