= Er (biblical person) =

Biblical figure; first son of Judah

This article discusses the son of Judah. The Gospel of Luke lists another Er in the genealogy of Jesus and the First Book of Chronicles mentions another Er as being one of Shelah's sons.

In the biblical Book of Genesis, Er (Hebrew: עֵר, Modern: Er, Tiberian: ʻĒr "watcher"; Greek: Ἤρ) was the eldest son of Judah and his Canaanite wife, the daughter of Shuah. He is recorded as marrying Tamar. According to the text, "the Lord slew" Er because he was wicked, although it does not give any further details.

Er had two brothers, Onan and Shelah. Judah instructed Onan to take Tamar and "perform the duty of a brother-in-law to her", so that a child could be born as Er's offspring. Onan's practice of "spelling his seed" prevented Er from being honoured in this way.

== Biblical criticism ==
Some modern bible critics interpret the story of Er as an eponymous aetiological myth to explain fluctuations in the constituency of the tribe of Judah, with the abrupt death of Er reflecting the death of a clan; the presence of an Er as a descendant of Shelah, in the First Book of Chronicles suggests that Er was in reality the name of a clan that was originally equal in status to the Shelah clan, but was later subsumed by it. The brother — Onan — may represent an Edomite clan named Onam, who are mentioned in an Edomite genealogy in Genesis.

These critics have also argued that the Tamar narrative, of which the description of Er is a part, secondarily aims to either assert the institution of levirate marriage, or present an aetiological myth for its origin; Er's role in the narrative would thus be as the background to the main plot, his death being the reason for levirate marriage to become an issue. John Emerton, Regius Professor of Hebrew at the University of Cambridge, regards the evidence for this as inconclusive, though classical rabbinical writers argued that this narrative does concern the origin of levirate marriage.

== Family tree ==
Judah	Daughter of Shuah
Er	Tamar	Onan	Shelah
Perez and Zerah (twins)
