= Perez (son of Judah) =

Biblical figure; son of Judah and twin brother of Zerah

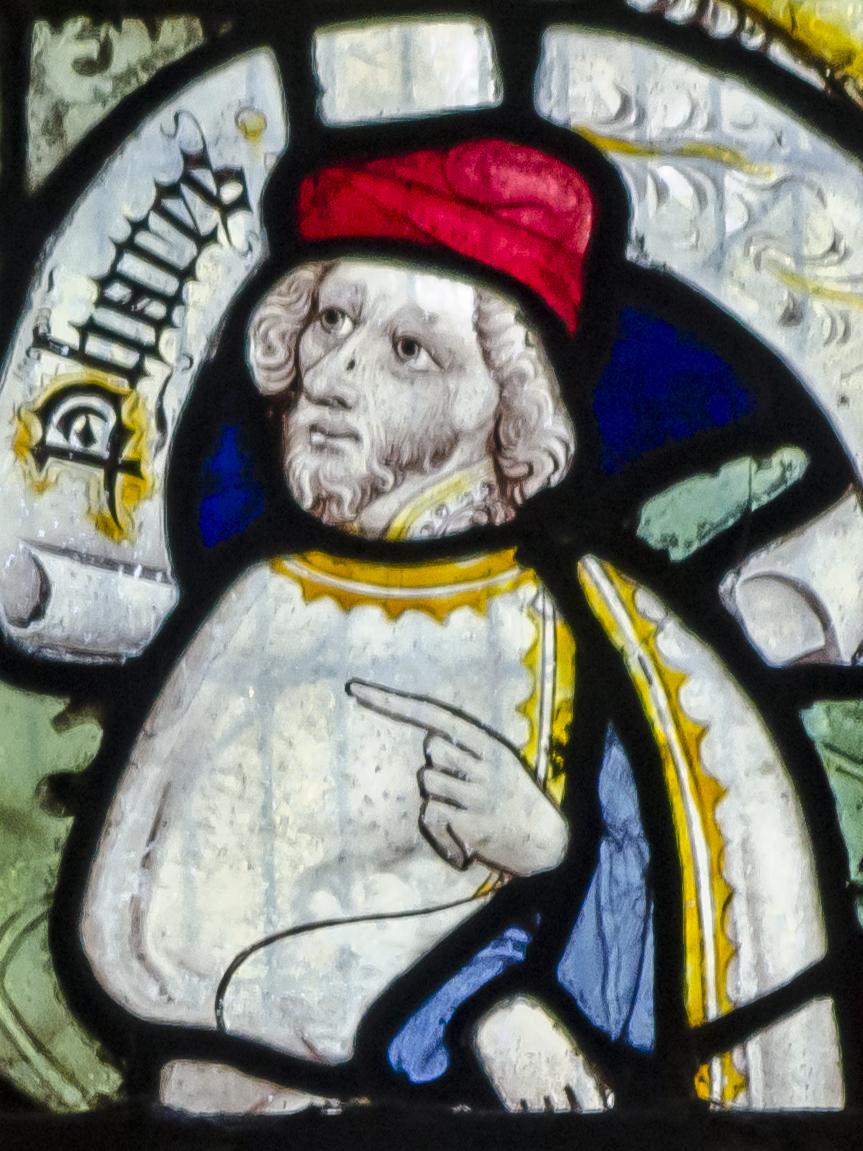
- Parents: Judah (father); Tamar (mother)
- Relatives: Zerah (twin brother)

Perez, also written as Pharez/Peretz (Hebrew: פֶּרֶץ / פָּרֶץ, Modern Pereṣ / Pareṣ Tiberian Péreṣ / Pāreṣ), was the son of Tamar and her father-in-law Judah, and the twin of Zerah, according to the Book of Genesis. The twins were conceived after Tamar tricked her father-in-law Judah into having sexual intercourse with her by disguising herself as a prostitute. The name is transliterated to English as both "Perez" (NIV, ESV, NKJV) and "Pharez" (KJV). Perez, in Hebrew means "breach or burst forth" and is named after the narrative of his birth as recorded in Genesis 38:29. According to Ethiopian tradition, Perez became a king of Persia.

== Biblical account ==
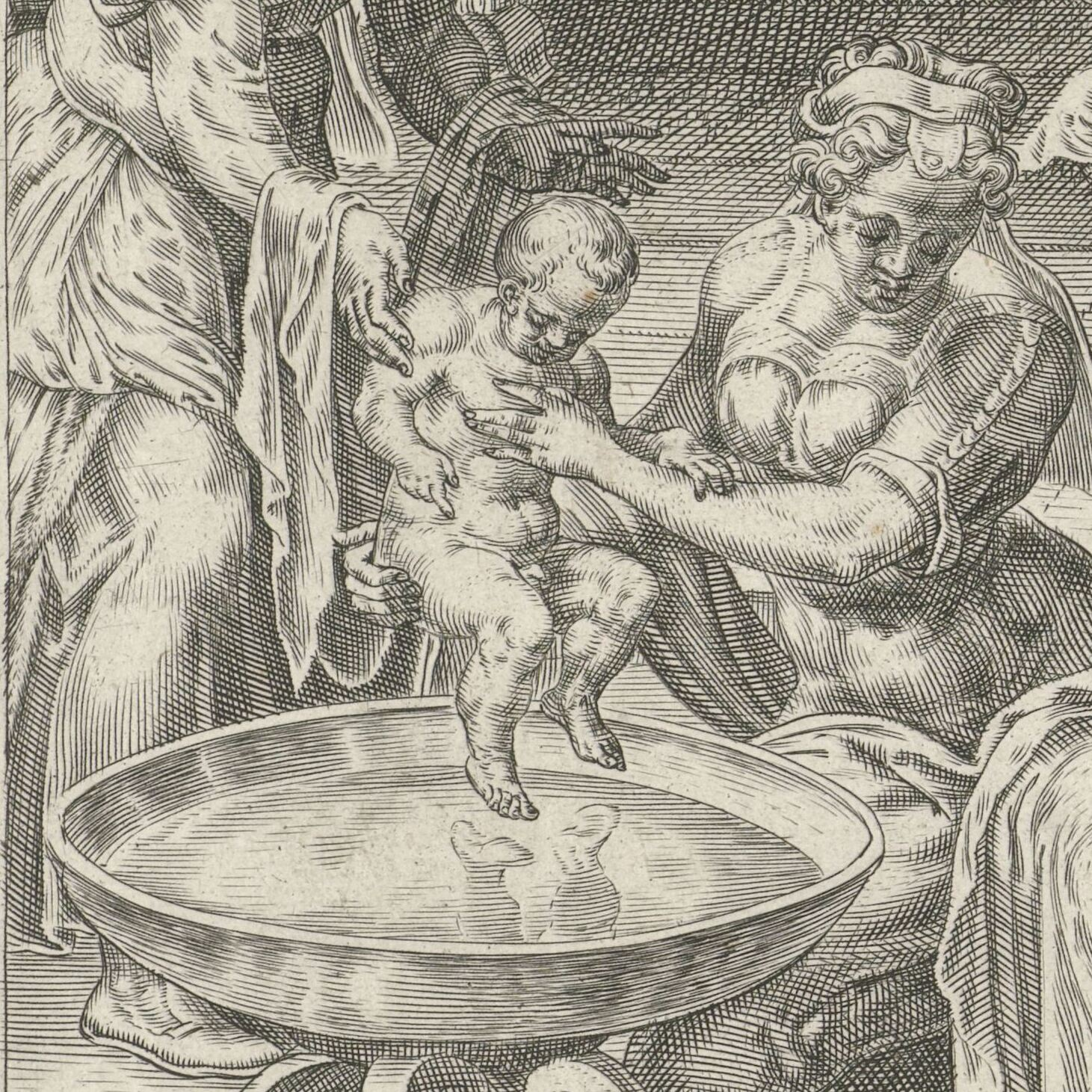
Bathing of the baby Peres depicted in a gravure print by Harmen Jansz Muller, 1564–1568

27 When the time came for her to give birth, there were twins in her womb! 28 While she was in labor, one of them put out a hand, and the midwife tied a crimson thread on that hand, to signify: This one came out first. 29 But just then it drew back its hand, and out came its brother; and she said, “What a breach (Heb. pereṣ) you have made for yourself!” So he was named Perez.

— Genesis 38:27–29

The Book of Ruth lists Perez as being part of the ancestral genealogy of King David, and both the Gospel according to Matthew through Joseph and the Gospel according to Luke through Mary include him when specifying the genealogy of Jesus.

=== Family tree ===
Judah	Daughter of Shuah
Er	Tamar	Onan	Shelah
Perez & Zerah (twins)
