= Judah (son of Jacob) =

Biblical figure and son of Jacob and Leah

- יְהוּדָה
- Judah from Judah and Tamar (1840) by Horace Vernet
- Born: c. 1600 BCE; Paddan Aram, Aram-Naharaim (present-day Harran, Turkey)
- Died: Yehud, Canaan (present-day Yehud, Israel)
- Resting place: 32.030797°N 34.887616°E
- Spouse: Aliyath
- Children: Sons through Aliyath: Er; Onan; Shelah; Twin sons through his daughter-in-law Tamar: Perez and Zerah
- Parents: Jacob (father); Leah (mother)
- Relatives: See list: Reuben (brother); Simeon (brother); Levi (brother); Dan (half-brother); Naphtali (half-brother); Gad (half-brother); Asher (half-brother); Issachar (brother); Zebulun (brother); Dinah (sister); Joseph (half-brother); Benjamin (half-brother); Rachel (aunt/stepmother)

Judah (Hebrew: יְהוּדָה, Modern: Yəhūda, Tiberian: Yŭhūḏā) was, according to the Book of Genesis, the fourth of the six sons of Jacob and Leah and the founder of the Tribe of Judah of the Israelites. By extension, he is indirectly the eponym of the Kingdom of Judah, the land of Judea, and the word Jew.

According to the narrative in Genesis, Judah alongside Tamar is a patrilineal ancestor of the Davidic line. The Tribe of Judah features prominently in Deuteronomistic history, which most scholars agree was reduced to written form, although subject to exilic and post-exilic alterations and emendations, during the reign of the Judahist reformer Josiah from 641 to 609 BCE.

== Etymology ==
The Hebrew name for Judah, Yehuda (יהודה), literally "thanksgiving" or "praise", is the noun form of the root Y-H-D (יהד), "to thank" or "to praise". His birth is reported in Genesis 29:35: after his birth, Leah exclaims, "This time I will praise the LORD/YHWH", with the Hebrew word for "I will praise", odeh (אודה), sharing the same root as Yehuda.

Alternatively, Edward Lipiński connected Hebrew yĕhūdā with Arabic whd / wahda "cleft, ravine".

== Biblical references ==
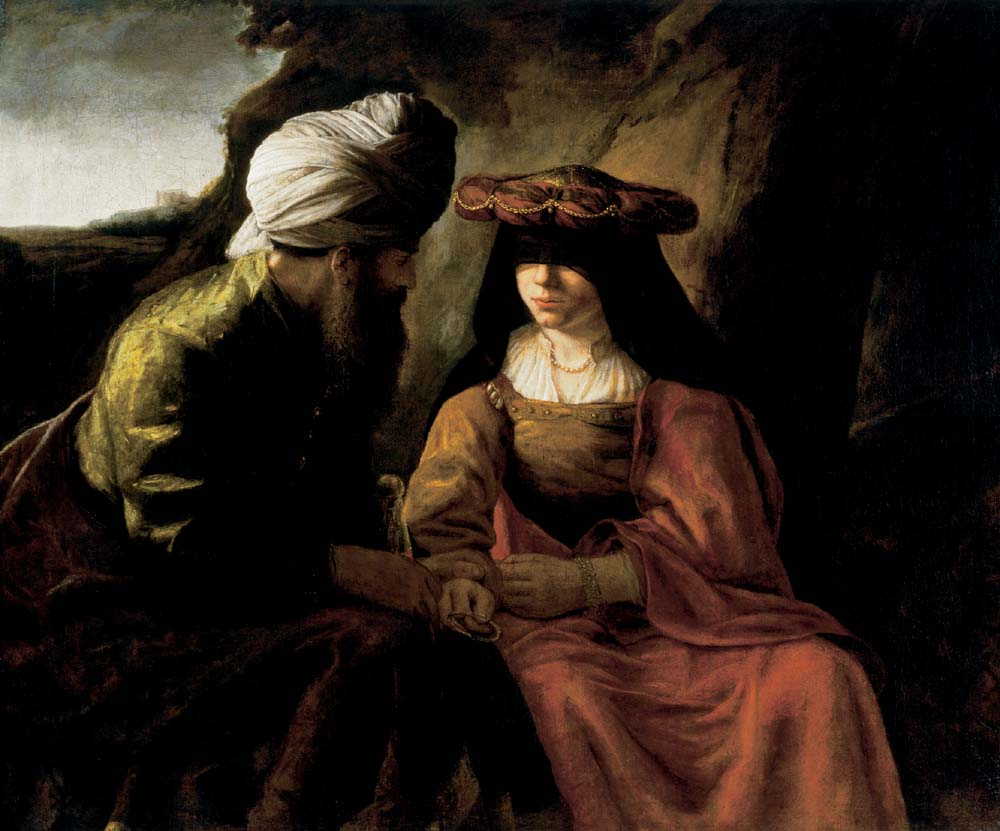
Judah (left) talking to Tamar (right) (1606–1669), by Rembrandt

Judah is the fourth son of the patriarch Jacob and his first wife, Leah: his full brothers are Reuben, Simeon and Levi (all older), and Issachar and Zebulun (younger), and he has one full sister, Dinah. Through his father, he also has six half-brothers: Dan and Naphtali (whose mother is Bilhah), Gad and Asher (whose mother is Zilpah), and Joseph and Benjamin (whose mother is Rachel).

Following his birth, his mother Leah "stopped having children", although at a later stage the births of Issachar, Zebulun and Dinah are reported.

Judah's next appearance is in Genesis 37, when he and his brothers cast Joseph into a pit out of jealousy after Joseph approaches them, flaunting a coat of many colors, while they are working in the fields near Dothan. It is Judah who spots a caravan of Ishmaelite or Midianite traders en route to Egypt: both terms are used in Genesis 37:25-28. He suggests that Joseph be sold to them rather than be killed:

"What profit is it if we slay our brother, and conceal his blood? ... and let not our hand be upon him; for he is our brother and our flesh."

This part of the narrative concludes with Judah's brothers complying with his proposal.

Judah marries the daughter of Shuah, a Canaanite. In Genesis chapter 38, Judah and his wife have three children, Er, Onan, and Shelah. Er marries Tamar, but God kills him because he was wicked in His sight (Gen. 38:7). Tamar becomes Onan's wife in accordance with custom, but he too is killed after he refuses to father children for his older brother's childless widow, and spills his seed instead. Although Tamar should have married Shelah, the remaining brother, Judah did not consent, and in response Tamar deceives Judah into having intercourse with her by pretending to be a prostitute. When Judah discovers that Tamar is pregnant he prepares to have her killed, but recants and confesses when he finds out that he is the father (Genesis 38:24-26). Tamar is the mother of twins, Perez (Peretz) and Zerah (Genesis 38:27-30). The former is the patrilinear ancestor of the messiah, according to the Book of Ruth (4:18-22).

Meanwhile, Joseph rises to a position of power in Egypt. Twenty years after being betrayed, he meets his brothers again without them recognizing him. The youngest brother, Benjamin, had remained in Canaan with Jacob, so Joseph takes Simeon hostage and insists that the brothers return with Benjamin. Judah offers himself to Jacob as surety for Benjamin's safety, and manages to persuade Jacob to let them take Benjamin to Egypt. When the brothers return, Joseph tests them by instructing his servant to put his silver goblet in Benjamin's bag and then demanding the enslavement of Benjamin when the goblet is discovered. Judah pleads for Benjamin's life and offers to take his place, then Joseph reveals his true identity. Before he dies, Jacob blesses Judah as his lead heir, stating that his other sons "shall bow down before you" and that he shall hold "the ruler's staff."

== Textual criticism ==
=== Relationship between the Joseph and Judah narratives ===
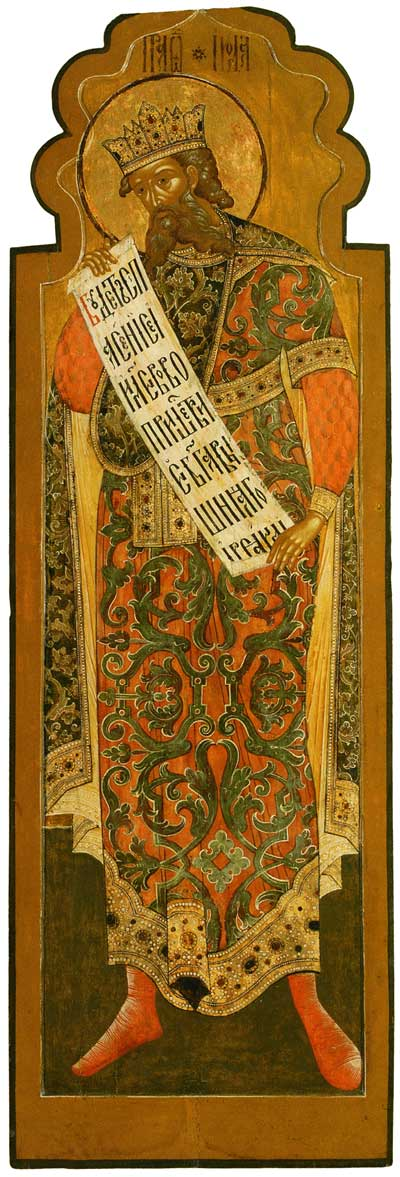
Patriarch Judah, Russian Orthodox depiction, c. 1654

Literary critics have focused on the relationship between the Judah story in chapter 38, and the Joseph story in chapters 37 and 39. Victor Hamilton notes some "intentional literary parallels" between the chapters, such as the exhortation to "identify" (38:25-26 and 37:32-33). J. A. Emerton, Regius Professor of Hebrew at the University of Cambridge, regards the connections as evidence for including chapter 38 in the J corpus, and suggests that the J writer dovetailed the Joseph and Judah traditions. Derek Kidner points out that the insertion of chapter 38 "creates suspense for the reader", but Robert Alter goes further and suggests it is a result of the "brilliant splicing of sources by a literary artist". He notes that the same verb identify will play "a crucial thematic role in the dénouement of the Joseph story when he confronts his brothers in Egypt, he recognizing them, they failing to recognize him". Similarly, J. P. Fokkelman notes that the "extra attention" paid to Judah in chapter 38, "sets him up for his major role as the brothers' spokesman in Genesis 44".

=== Foreshadowing the hegemony of Judah ===
Other than Joseph (and perhaps Benjamin), Judah receives the most favorable treatment in Genesis among Jacob's sons, which according to biblical historians is a reflection on the historical primacy that the tribe of Judah possessed throughout much of Israel's history, including as the source of the Davidic line. Although Judah is only the fourth son of Leah, he is expressly depicted in Genesis as assuming a leadership role among the 10 eldest brothers, including speaking up against killing Joseph, negotiating with his father regarding Joseph's demand that Benjamin be brought down to Egypt, and pleading with Joseph to become his slave in Benjamin's place.

Judah's position is further enhanced through the downfall of his older brothers: Reuben, the eldest, cedes his birthright through sexual misconduct with Jacob's concubine Bilhah (Gen. 35:22), and the bloody revenge taken by Simeon and Levi following the rape of Dinah (Gen. chap. 34) disqualifies them as leaders. The eternal legacy of these events are foreshadowed in the deathbed blessing of Jacob (Gen. 49:1-33), which has been attributed according to the documentary hypothesis to the pro-Judah Yahwist source. In Jacob's blessing, Reuben has "not the excellency" to lead "because thou went up to thy father's bed, then defiled [it]"; meanwhile, Simeon and Levi are condemned as "cruel" and "weapons of violence [are] their kinship". (Gen. 49.:3-7.) On the other hand, Judah is praised as "a lion's whelp" whose brothers "shall bow down before thee", and "the sceptre shall not depart from Judah" (Genesis 49:10), the latter a clear reference to the aspirations of the united monarchy.

Hebraist Gary Rendsburg argues that the original Biblical audience would have noticed the parallels between Judah and Tamar on the one hand and David and Bathsheba on the other. In particular, Rendsburg notes the similarity between Bathsheba (בַּת-שֱבַע, bat-šɛbaʿ, ‘Bathsheba) and Judah's wife the daughter of Shua', whose name is not given (בַּת-שוּעַ, bat…šua, the daughter of … Shua).

Archaeologist and scholar Israel Finkelstein argues that these and other pro-Judah narrative strands likely originated after the demise of the Kingdom of Israel in the eighth century BCE: "[I]t was only after the fall of Israel that Judah grew into a fully developed state with the necessary complement of professional priests and trained scribes able to undertake such a task. When Judah suddenly faced the non-Israelite world on its own, it needed a defining and motivating text. That text was the historical core of the Bible, composed in Jerusalem in the course of the seventh century BCE. And because Judah was the birthplace of ancient Israel's central scripture, it is hardly surprising that the biblical text repeatedly stresses Judah's special status from the very beginnings of Israel's history.... [In Genesis], it was Judah, among all of Jacob's sons, whose destiny was to rule over all the other tribes in Israel."

=== The story of Judah and Tamar in the historical context ===
Emerton notes that it is "widely agreed" that the story of Judah and Tamar "reflects a period after the settlement of the Israelites in Canaan". He also suggests the possibility that it contains "aetiological motifs concerned with the eponymous ancestors of the clans of Judah". Emerton notes that Dillman and Noth considered the account of the deaths of Er and Onan to "reflect the dying out of two clans of Judah bearing their names, or at least of their failure to maintain a separate existence". However, this view was "trenchantly criticized" by Thomas L. Thompson.

Along with the account of Lot and his daughters (Genesis 19:30–38), Tamar and Judah is one of two instances of "sperm stealing" in the Bible, in which a woman seduces a male relative under false pretenses in order to become pregnant.

== Jewish tradition ==
=== Rabbinic commentaries ===
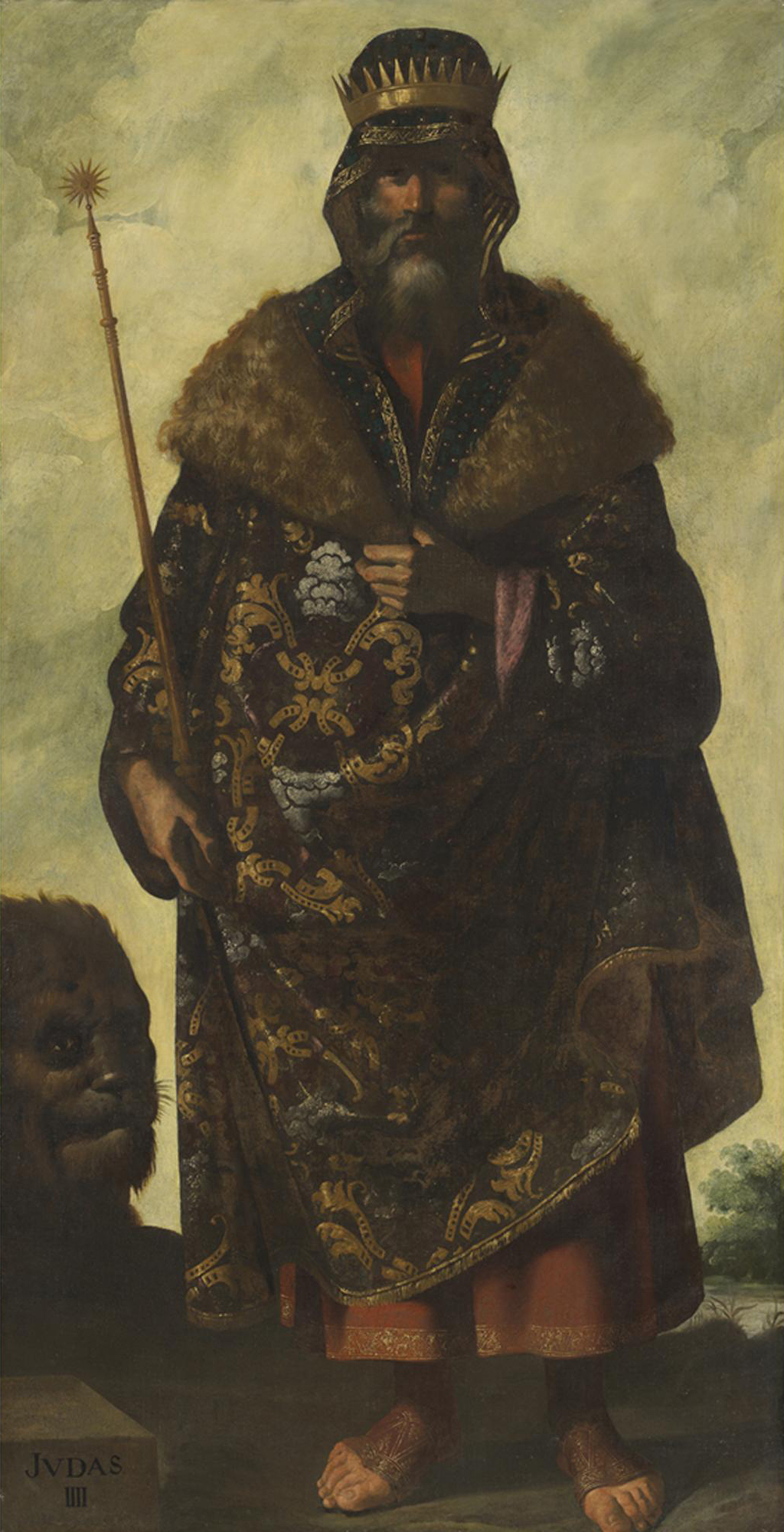
Judah, from the series Jacob and His Twelve Sons c. 1640 – c. 1645 by Francisco de Zurbarán

The text of the Torah argues that the name of Judah, meaning to thank or admit, refers to Leah's intent to thank Hashem, on account of having achieved four children, and derived from odeh, meaning I will give thanks. In classical rabbinical literature, the name is interpreted as a combination of Yahweh and a dalet (the letter d); in Gematria, the dalet has the numerical value 4, which these rabbinical sources argue refers to Judah being Jacob's fourth son. Since Leah was matriarch, Jewish scholars think the text's authors believed the tribe was part of the original Israelite confederation; however, it is worthy of note that the tribe of Judah was not purely Israelite, but contained a large admixture of non-Israelites, with a number of Kenizzite groups, the Jerahmeelites, and the Kenites, merging into the tribe at various points.

Classical rabbinical sources refer to the passage "... a ruler came from Judah", from 1 Chronicles 5:2, to imply that Judah was the leader of his brothers, terming him the king. This passage also describes Judah as the strongest of his brothers in which rabbinical literature portray him as having had extraordinary physical strength, able to shout for over 400 parasangs, able to crush iron into dust by his mouth, and with hair that stiffened so much, when he became angry, that it pierced his clothes.

Classical rabbinical sources also allude to a war between the Canaanites and Judah's family (not mentioned in the Hebrew Bible), as a result of their destruction of Shechem in revenge for the rape of Dinah; Judah features heavily as a protagonist in accounts of this war. In these accounts Judah kills Jashub, king of Tappuah, in hand-to-hand combat, after first having deposed Jashub from his horse by throwing an extremely heavy stone (60 shekels in weight) at him from a large distance away (the Midrash Wayissau states 177⅓ cubits, while other sources have only 30 cubits); the accounts say that Judah was able to achieve this even though he was himself under attack, from arrows which Jashub was shooting at him with both hands. The accounts go on to state that while Judah was trying to remove Jashub's armour from his corpse, nine assistants of Jashub fell upon him in combat, but after Judah killed one, he scared away the others; nevertheless, Judah killed several members of Jashub's army (42 men according to the midrashic Book of Jasher, but 1000 men according to the Testament of Judah).

According to some classical sources, Jacob suspected that Judah had killed Joseph, especially, according to the Midrash Tanhuma, when Judah was the one who had brought the blood stained coat to Jacob.

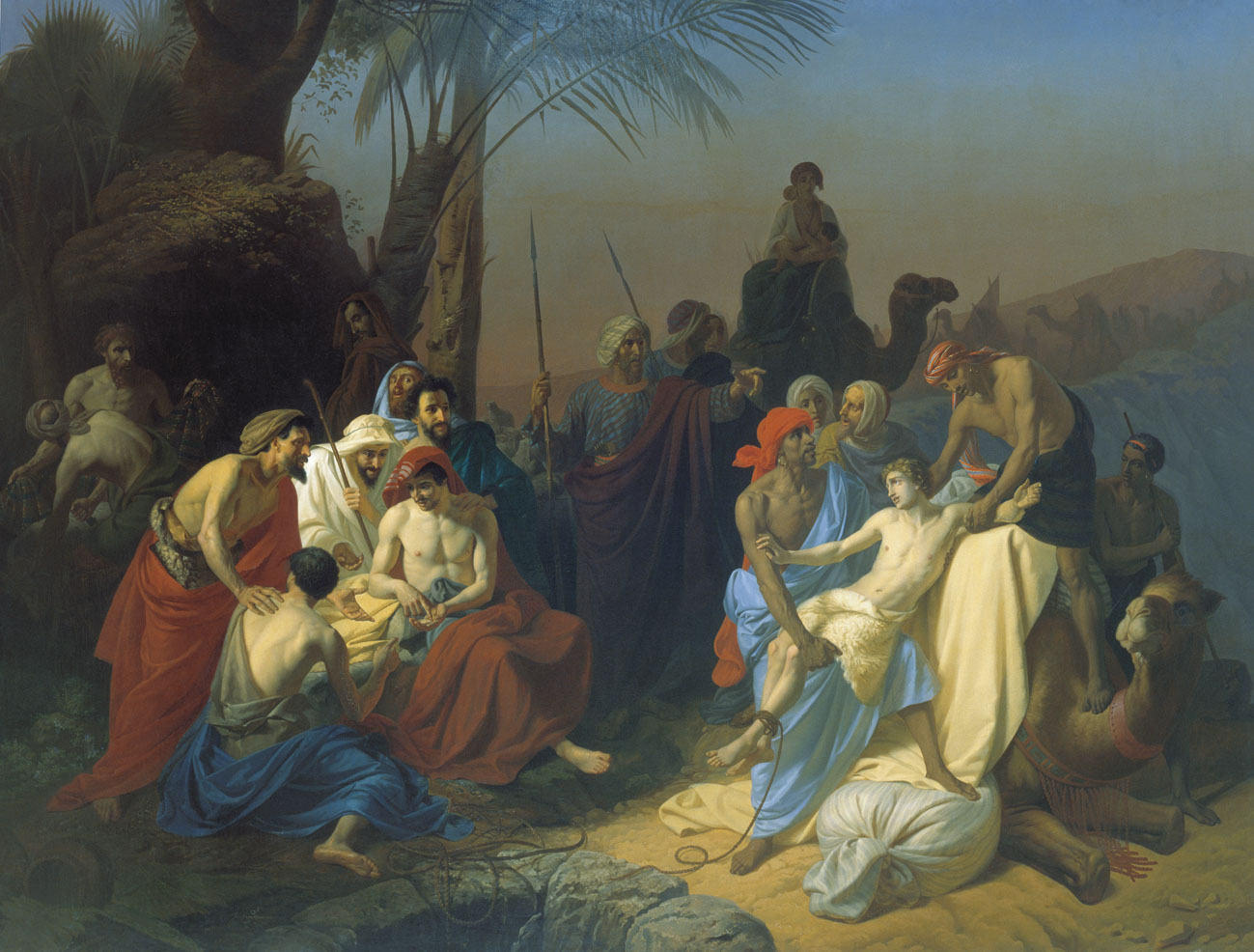
The children of Jacob sell their brother Joseph by Konstantin Flavitsky, 1855. Judah was the one who suggested that Joseph be sold, rather than killed.

Since rabbinical sources held Judah to have been the leader of his brothers, these sources also hold that the other nine brothers blamed him to be responsible for this deception, even if it was not Judah himself who brought the coat to Jacob. Even if Judah had been trying to save Joseph, the classical rabbinical sources still regard him negatively for it; these sources argue that, as the leader of the brothers, Judah should have made more effort and carried Joseph home to Jacob on his (Judah's) own shoulders. These sources argue that Judah's brothers, after witnessing Jacob's grief at the loss of Joseph, deposed and excommunicated Judah, as the brothers held Judah entirely responsible, since they would have brought Joseph home if Judah had asked them to do so. Divine punishment, according to such classical sources, was also inflicted on Judah in punishment; the death of Er and Onan, and of his wife, are portrayed in by such classical rabbis as being acts of divine retribution.

When Benjamin was held in bondage following the accusation of stealing Joseph's cup, Judah offered himself among his brethren as a bondman in replace of him, but Joseph was strict that the punishment is only applied to the one who was guilty, not to the innocent ones.

According to classical rabbinical literature, because Judah had proposed that he should take any blame forever, this ultimately led to his bones being rolled around his coffin without cease, while it was being carried during the Exodus, until Moses interceded with God, by arguing that Judah's confession (in regard to cohabiting with Tamar) had led to Reuben confessing his own incest. Apparently, Judah learned a lesson from his experience with Tamar that he must be responsible for those around him and this eventually prepares him for his future reconciliatory encounter with Joseph.

Genesis Rabbah, and particularly the midrashic book of Jasher, expand on this by describing Judah's plea as much more extensive than given in the Torah, and more vehement.

The classical rabbinical literature argues that Judah reacted violently to the threat against Benjamin, shouting so loudly that Hushim, who was then in Canaan, was able to hear Judah ask him to travel to Egypt, to help Judah destroy it; some sources have Judah angrily picking up an extremely heavy stone (400 shekels in weight), throwing it into the air, then grinding it to dust with his feet once it had landed. These rabbinical sources argue that Judah had Naphtali enumerate the districts of Egypt, and after finding out that there were 12 (historically, there were actually 20 in Lower Egypt and 22 in Upper Egypt), he decided to destroy three himself and have his brothers destroy one of the remaining districts each; the threat of destroying Egypt was, according to these sources, what really motivated Joseph to reveal himself to his brothers.

=== Testament of Judah ===
Before his death, Judah told his children about his bravery and heroism in the wars against the kings of Canaan and the family of Esau, also confessed his shortcomings caused by wine that led him astray in his relationship with Bathshua and Tamar. Judah admonished his sons not to love gold, and not to look upon the beauty of women, for through these things, the sons of Judah will fall into misery. In his last words, he reminded them to observe the whole law of the Lord.

=== Dating the lifetime of Judah ===
According to Classical rabbinical literature, Judah was born on 15 Sivan (early June); classical sources differ on the date of death, with the Book of Jubilees advocating a death at age 119, 18 years before Levi, but the midrashic Book of Jasher advocating a death at the age of 129.

The marriage of Judah and births of his children are described in a passage widely regarded as an abrupt change to the surrounding narrative. The passage is often regarded as presenting a significant chronological issue, as the surrounding context appears to constrain the events of the passage to happening within 22 years, and the context together with the passage itself requires the birth of the grandson of Judah and of his son's wife, and the birth of that son to have happened within this time (to be consistent, this requires an average of less than 8 years gap per generation). According to textual scholars, the reason for the abrupt interruption this passage causes to the surrounding narrative, and the chronological anomaly it seems to present, is that it derives from the Jahwist source, while the immediately surrounding narrative is from the Elohist.

== Family tree ==
Judah	Daughter of Shuah
Er	Tamar	Onan	Shelah
Perez and Zerah (twins)

== Tomb ==
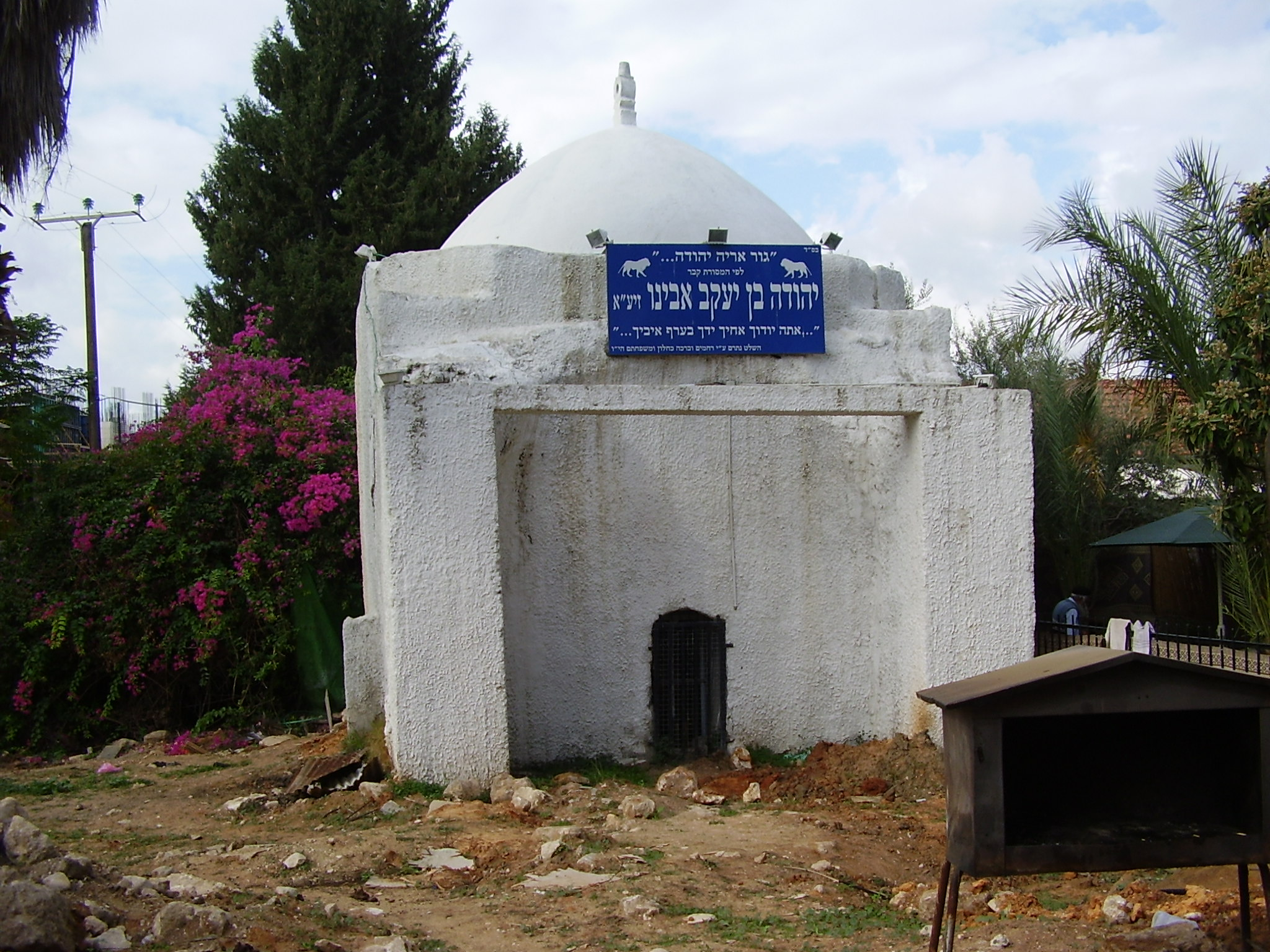
Tomb attributed to Judah in Yehud, Israel

Local Muslim and Samaritan traditions placed the tomb of Judah (Nabi Huda ibn Sayyidna Ya'qub, "the prophet Judah, son of our lord Jacob") at al-Yahudiya, present-day Yehud. Today, it is a destination of Jewish pilgrimage.

Another local tradition, held by Druze and Muslims, places the tomb of Judah in "Nabi Yehuda", a maqam located near Horvat Omrit in the Hula Valley.

== See also ==
- Lion of Judah

== Bibliography ==
- Winckler, Hugo, Geschichte Israels (Berlin, 1895)
- Meyer, Eduard, Die Israeliten und ihre Nachbarstämme (Halle, 1906)
- Haupt, Paul, Studien ... Welthausen gewidmet (Giessen, 1914)
- Rendsburg, Gary, How the Bible is Written (Peabody, 2019)
