= Central churchmanship =

Anglican Church member designation

Central churchmanship describes those who adhere to a middle way in the Anglican Communion of the Christian religion and other Anglican church bodies, being neither Anglo-Catholic nor low church in their doctrinal views and liturgical preferences.

The term is used much less frequently than some others as Anglicanism polarized into Anglo-Catholic and Evangelical/Reformed wings.

In The Claims of the Church of England, Cyril Garbett, Archbishop of York, used the term along with Anglo-Catholic, liberal, and evangelical as a label for schools within the Church of England, but also states:

Within the Anglican Church are Anglo-Catholics, Evangelicals, Liberals and the great mass of English Churchmen who are content to describe themselves as Churchmen without any further label.

== History ==
The term came into use in the late nineteenth century when traditional high churchmen decided to distance themselves from Anglo-Catholicism that came out of the Oxford Movement. With the Oxford Movement having become much "higher" than them, they first called themselves "Old High Church", but after failing to stop the rise of Anglo-Catholicism, adopted the Center position.

F.A. Iremonger places William Temple among this group, emphasizing that Temple had a firm hold on the articles of the historic Creeds and a conviction that what is best in each school of thought within the Church is worth conserving.

Perhaps the best-known exponent of the central churchman position in the twentieth century was Geoffrey Francis Fisher, Archbishop of Canterbury from 1945 to 1961. Other English bishops, including Robert Stopford, Henry Montgomery Campbell, and Mervyn Haigh also favored a central churchmanship approach, as a way of defusing tensions within their dioceses, and as a way of promoting a so-called "brand image" for the Church of England.

Since the 1970s, central churchmanship as a distinct school of thought and practice within the Church of England has been in decline. This is partly due to the closure or merger of some theological colleges that used to favor the central position—namely, Wells Theological College, Lincoln Theological College, and Tenbury Wells—and a drift towards theological liberalism, or Affirming Catholicism in others.

== Difference with the "Broad Church" ==
Traditionally, Broad church was called Latitudinarianism, which supported a broad-based (sensu lato, with "laxitude") Anglicanism tolerant of (indeed, indifferent to) a spectrum of theology and practice. At the time, this position was referred to as a feature of a segment within the Low church (in contrast to the High church position, from which the Central church stance stems). While always formally/officially opposed by the Anglican church, the latitudinarian orientation was, nevertheless, fairly dominant in 18th-century England.

In modern American Episcopal Church (TEC) usage, broad church is used to refer to this same tendency of tolerance (or theological indifference) which flourished well into the 19th century; however, with the decline of central church views in TEC, it has at times become used (incorrectly) as a synonym for central churchmanship in the U.S.

Central churchmen, however, did not regard themselves as Broad churchmen. They conformed loyally, and believed other Anglicans should as well, to the doctrine and rubrics of the Book of Common Prayer (the Prayer Book), which they did not deviate from in either Anglo-Catholic or Low church directions. They sought to avoid what they considered to be the extremes of either "Papist or Puritan," in favour of the uniformity of the 'center'. Not theologically indifferent, they held to a traditional understanding of Christian faith, the Creeds, and the Prayer Book, whereas the Broad church tended doctrinally more towards Liberal Christianity.

== Practice and theology ==
Central churchmen value both the official liturgies of the Church of England, which they clothe in a moderate amount of ceremony and a characteristically Anglican way of doing theology that is rooted in the Bible and the Creeds of the Early Church, whilst also valuing the contributions made by the English Reformation. In their theology, they steer a middle course between the Anglo-Catholic and Evangelical parties, both of which Central churchmen consider extreme.

Theology for Central churchmen is very much a continuation of the 'Old High Church'. Central churchmen basically follow the line of development that begins with Richard Hooker, through Lancelot Andrewes to William Laud and the Caroline Divines, and then on to eighteenth and nineteenth century High churchmen like Daniel Waterland, William Van Mildert, Harold Browne, George Pretyman Tomline, and Christopher Wordsworth. Central churchmen are Sacramental Arminians in outlook, believing that baptism confers regeneration, that one can leave the faith if one apostatizes, that election is corporate, and that Christ is truly present in the elements of Communion. They hold to a mild form of the doctrine of Apostolic Succession, and are not charismatic.

== See also ==
- Laudianism
- High Church
- Low Church
- Broad Church
- Anglo-Catholicism
