= Laudianism =

Early seventeenth-century English reform movement

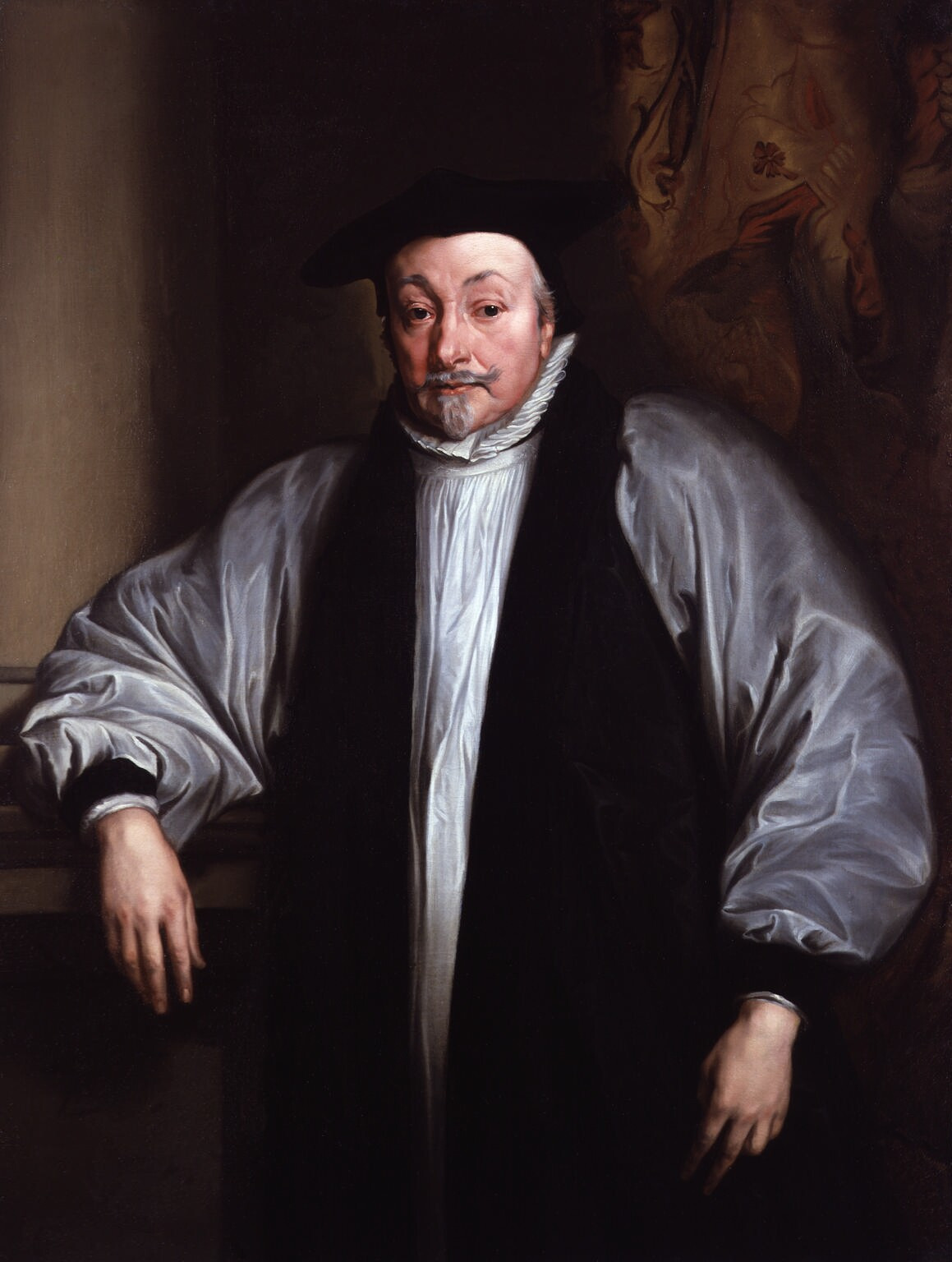
William Laud, for whom "Laudianism" is named, as Archbishop of Canterbury during the reign of Charles I.

Laudianism, also called Old High Churchmanship, or later Orthodox Anglicanism, was an early seventeenth-century reform movement within the Church of England that tried to avoid the extremes of Roman Catholicism and Puritanism by building on the work of Richard Hooker, and John Jewel and was promulgated by Archbishop William Laud and his supporters. It rejected the predestination upheld by Calvinism in favour of free will, and hence the possibility of salvation for all men through objective work of the sacraments.

Laudianism had a significant impact on the Anglican high church movement and its emphasis on the sacraments, personal holiness, beautiful liturgy, and the episcopate. It was a culmination of the move to Arminianism in the Church of England, and its theology was expressed by the Caroline Divines, of which Laud was one of the first.

== Theology ==
The Elizabethan Settlement of 1559, which set the tone for English religious policy until the rise of Laudianism, was theologically a mixture of Lutheranism, some pre-council of Trent Catholic doctrines, and some minor elements from Calvinism. The doctrine of predestination was to be handled with care at a parish level in order to offset despair and the ensuing disobedience, the seventeenth of the Thirty-Nine Articles sets out a doctrine of predestination to life, in Christ, as one of the founding principles of the English Church and omits reference to reprobation. “Furthermore we must receive God’s promises in such wise as they be generally set forth in holy Scripture; and in our doings that will of God is to be followed, which we have expressly declared to us in the word of God.” The word generally is in the Latin generaliter, which means not usually, but universally and Article 31 says "Christ once made is that perfect redemption, propitiation, and satisfaction, for all the sins of the whole world, both original and actual"

Building on this, Laudianism is based in the universality and objectivity of God's grace through the Sacraments, the universal atonement and the free will of all men to obtain salvation in Christ's Church through the Sacraments as means of grace thus, various Reformed theories of predestination were rejected, and predestination was based on God's promise to the Church as the Ark of Salvation in Ecclesiastical Election.

Salvation was conditioned on entering the Church through Baptism and remaining in the church and not departing from it, as well as being nourished and strengthened by Communion.

This is significant since one of the main points of Calvinism is the replacement of the teaching that salvation necessarily came from the Church through the Sacraments, but rather came through the individual, and Unconditional election of God, which could not be forfeited.

However Roman Catholic practices condemned in the 39 Articles like, the Intercession of saints, Eucharistic adoration, and prayers for the dead were rejected, as were the Roman doctrines concerning the Sacrifice of the Mass. Laudianism was as opposed to the "Papists" as the Puritans.

The Sacraments are emphasized as means of Grace open to all who confess their sins and truly repent, and Baptism and Communion were raised over the preaching of sermons. Personal holiness and the necessity of good works are emphasized and taught, and the Daily Office was encouraged and the "Beauty of Holiness" in aesthetics was emphasized against the low church practice of the Calvinists. The services were referred to as high and dry.

Subjective means of determining ones state with God or ones vocation were rejected in favor of objective means, and emotionalism and other forms of Enthusiasm were not to be trusted.

The political theology of Laudianism was the Divine right of kings and that power flows from God down to the King, not from the people up to the King. Those who followed it were called Cavaliers and it later became the Tory movement.

== Laudianism and Puritan Calvinism ==
Unconditional election was the unifying feature of the Continental Reformed Churches, and the Puritans of all types. The rejection and suppression of this view of election led to deep friction within the Church of England between the Anglican and Puritan parties.

In addition, Archbishop Laud disagreed with the views of his predecessors, such as John Whitgift, that the Puritan Calvinists were aberrant brethren, erring but deserving some level of leniency; instead he believed that the Puritan non-conformists presented a direct threat to the establishment and that there was more common ground between Anglicanism and Lutheranism or even that of the pre-Reformed Roman Catholic Church.

The 1633 edition of the standard Latin-English Dictionary, dedicated to William Laud, contained for the first time the word Praedestinatiani, who were defined as "a kind of heretic that held fatal predestination of every particular matter person or action, and that all things come to passe, and fell out necessarily; especially touching the salvation and damnation of particular men".

These conflicts exacerbated the deep polarization within the Church of England, to the extent that Anglicans and Puritans could no longer be united in one church, which ultimately led to the Great Ejection.

== History ==
Following the royal marriage negotiations with Spain, James I faced an upsurge in hostility from the pulpit and the press. Although the King tried to quiet such opposition through proclamations, the confinement of offenders and a set of Directions to Preachers in 1622, opposition came from senior figures within the established Church, such as several royal chaplains, Dean Sutcliffe of Exeter, Archdeacon Hakewill of Surrey and George Abbot, Archbishop of Canterbury. Indeed, James reacted to this episode by moving his support to anti-Calvinist churchmen such as Lancelot Andrewes at Winchester dioceses and Montaigne at London dioceses, and at last elevating Laud to the episcopate, thus radically shifting the power-base in favour of the emerging movement.

Charles I took these personnel changes even further when Laud was promised the archbishopric of Canterbury. As bishop of London, he had been controlling the printing presses since 1628 and prohibiting discussion of predestination. The York primacy had been filled with a succession of Laudians since the death of Calvinist Matthews in 1628 and from 1632 it was occupied by Neile, the one-time mentor of William Laud. In 1628, the Duke of Buckingham was made Chancellor of Cambridge University and all predestinarian teaching was subsequently banned. This was supported by a royal proclamation which effectively outlawed Calvinism on a national level.

There was also a break with Calvinism on a visual level. Upon his translation to the bishopric of Durham in 1617, Richard Neile had the communion table transformed into an altar at the east end of the cathedral and supported Laud (then under his patronage) in a similar action at the dioceses of Gloucester.

In the 1630s, Laud declared that "the altar is the greatest place of God's residence upon earth, greater than the pulpit for there it is Hoc est corpus meum, This is my body; but in the other it is at most but Hoc est verbum meum, This is my word." In November 1633, by act of Privy Council King Charles I established the precedent that all parochial churches should follow the by then general cathedral practice of placing communion tables altar-wise at the east end of chancels.

The visual emphasis that this placed on the Real Presence and the Eucharist aligned with Lutheran practice and deemphasized the Calvinist practice of having the pulpit at the centre, which emphasized preaching.

Laud was concerned with conformity in the Church and the Puritans who did not follow the services as written in the Liturgy found in the Book of Common Prayer were labeled Nonconformists.

== Laudianism and the English Civil War ==
The 1630s saw deepening polarization of religious opinion influenced by reactions to tracts, sermons and lobbying. The religious changes Laud and King Charles tried to implement in Scotland culminating with the Prayer Book of 1637 which was produced under Laud for Scotland led to the formation of the Puritan Covenanters and the start of the Bishops' Wars.

After the 1640s, King Charles and any of the Cavaliers who supported him, found themselves under attack from the Roundheads. More books were published by Puritans attacking the Divine right of Kings, the most well known of which is Lex, Rex. Furthermore attacks on the episcopacy increased as both issues were linked, because in the 17th century 'true religion' and 'good government' were seen as mutually dependent. In general, Laudian Royalists supported a Church of England governed by bishops, appointed by, and answerable to, the king, while most Parliamentarians were Puritans and believed he was answerable to the leaders of the church, appointed by their congregations, or to the congregations themselves.

One reason was that bishops held a variety of non-religious roles which impacted all levels of society; they acted as state censors, who were able to ban sermons and writings, while ordinary people could be tried by church courts for crimes including blasphemy, heresy, fornication and other 'sins of the flesh', as well as matrimonial or inheritance disputes. As members of the House of Lords, bishops often blocked legislation opposed by the Crown; their ousting from Parliament by the Clergy Act 1640 was a major step on the road to war, since it meant Charles could no longer prevent passage of legislation that he opposed.

Their removal temporarily ended censorship, and especially in London led to an explosion in the printing of pamphlets, books and sermons, many advocating radical religious and political ideas, like doing away with Bishops in favor of a Congregationalist or Presbyterian form of Church Polity.

The Constitutions and Canons Ecclesiasticall were passed by the 1640 Convocation and they included as Canon VI, a pledge to uphold episcopacy and the current Anglican hierarchy.

During the First English Civil War, priests and bishops who had gathered in Convocation to draft the canons of 1640, within months, were unable to enforce them. By December 1640 thirteen bishops had been impeached, with another dozen having followed them by December 1641. Within eight weeks of the opening of Parliament, the Houses were calling not for the restoration of the Anglican church, but the abolition of the entire ecclesiastical order and its reconstruction in a Puritan mold.

During the conflicts the removal of ecclesiastical judges and the abolition of the High Commission meant that the Established Church was unprotected on a parish level since the Church could no longer charge anyone with a crime. Prayer books and surplices were torn up; communion tables were relocated and altar rails were burned by the Puritans.

The re-establishment of the Anglican Church would not occur until the Restoration in 1660 when William Juxon, who gave King Charles I his last rites, was made Archbishop of Canterbury.

== See also ==
- William Laud
- King Charles the Martyr and Charles I of England
- Arminianism in the Church of England
- Caroline Divines
- High church
- Central churchmanship
- Divine right of kings
- English Civil War
- Puritanism
