= Collective punishment =

Legal term

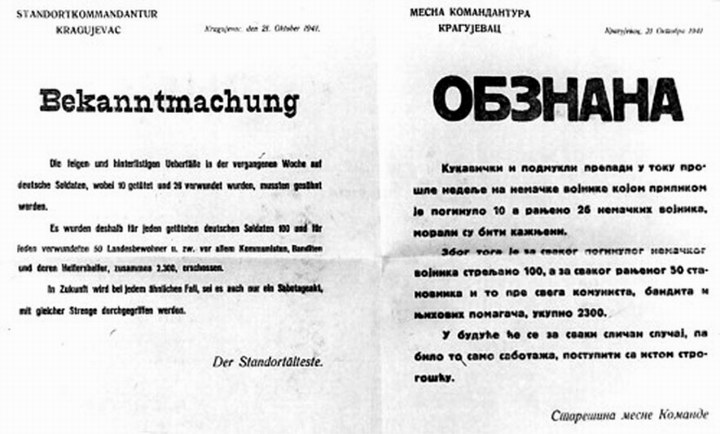
A public announcement by Nazi Germany in occupied Serbia on 21 October 1941, stating that the killing of 2,300 people in the Kragujevac massacre was carried out in retaliation for the killing of 10 German soldiers by the Yugoslav Partisans, and warning that punishments of the "same severity" (100 people for each killed soldier and 50 people for each wounded soldier) will take place for future incidents

Collective punishment is a punishment or sanction imposed on a group or whole community for acts allegedly perpetrated by a member or some members of that group or area, which could be an ethnic or political group, or just the family, friends and neighbors of the perpetrator, as well as entire cities and communities where the perpetrator(s) allegedly committed the crime. Because individuals who are not responsible for the acts are targeted, collective punishment is not compatible with the basic principle of individual responsibility. The punished group may often have no direct association with the perpetrator other than living in the same area and can not be assumed to exercise control over the perpetrator's actions. Collective punishment is prohibited by treaty in both international and/or non-international armed conflicts, more specifically Common Article 33 of the Fourth Geneva Convention and Article 4 of the Additional Protocol II.

== Sources of law ==
=== Hague Conventions ===
The Hague Conventions are often cited for guidelines concerning the limits and privileges of an occupier's rights with respect to the local (occupied) property. One of the restrictions on the occupier's use of natural resources is the Article 50 prohibition against collective punishment protecting private property.

=== Geneva Conventions ===
According to Médecins Sans Frontières:

International law posits that no protected person may be punished for acts that he or she did not commit. It ensures that the collective punishment of a group of persons for a crime committed by an individual is forbidden...This is one of the fundamental guarantees established by the Geneva Conventions and their protocols. This guarantee is applicable not only to protected persons but to all individuals, no matter what their status, or to what category of persons they belong...

== Overview ==
=== Collective responsibility ===
Modern legal systems usually limit criminal liability to individuals. An example of this is the prohibition on "Corruption of Blood" in the Treason Clause of the United States Constitution. Moral philosophers will usually use notions of intention or knowledge to establish individual moral responsibility. This agency based theory from Kantian ethics may not be the only way to assess responsibility. Ruth Gavison wanted the Israeli legal system to be based on the moral compass of Jewish heritage:

"I hope that in another generation, when the Jewish children of today are sitting on the bench of the Supreme Court, they will know how to express Kant's Categorical Imperative in the 'Jewish' language of Hillel the Elder. When they want to strike down collective punishment, I hope they will be able to invoke the Jewish maxim: 'Each by his own sin will die'. not just universal literature on the subject."

=== Deterrence ===
Collective liability may be effective as a deterrent, if it creates the incentive for the group to monitor the activities of other members. When collective fines are imposed on select groups of elites it can create an incentive for them to identify perpetrators but the effectiveness declines with an increase in the size of the group and their relative wealth.

Richard Posner and others consider collective fines to be the most effective type of collective punishment for deterring bad behavior when they are sufficiently costly and target those in a position to identify perpetrators.

In a 2023 study, legal scholar J. Shahar Dillbary and economist Thomas J. Miceli argued that punishing innocent members of a group is frequently a deliberate enforcement choice rather than an unavoidable error, and modelled the conditions under which sanctioning all, some, or none of a pool of suspects is preferable. Extending earlier economic models that treated the size of the punished group as fixed, they analysed that size as a variable to be chosen, identifying the enforcer's objective — deterrence or retribution — and the technology of detection as decisive; they also noted that collective liability can weaken incentives to take care and can give those able to identify a wrongdoer reasons to lie or collude.

=== Family punishment ===
Historically, punishment of family members was employed most often in the context of political crimes. In late Medieval Florence family groups could be punished collectively for treason, but not for other crimes. To preserve the Lombard law's historic mitigating impact on blood feuds an exception was made recognizing a collective responsibility for vendettas, in which case father, son and kinsmen were all held responsible. During the Qin dynasty of China (221–207 BC) treason was punishable by what is known as nine familial exterminations – the execution of the perpetrator's entire families as well as the perpetrators themselves.

Jeremy Bentham wrote of the cruelty of Corruption of Blood:

A cruel fiction of the lawyers to disguise the injustice of confiscation. The innocent grandson cannot inherit from the innocent grandfather, because his rights are corrupted and destroyed in passing through the blood of a guilty father. This corruption of blood is a fantastic idea; but there is a corruption too real in the understandings and the hearts of those who dishonor themselves by such sophisms.

== Types ==
=== Collective fines ===
A collective fine like the weregild may create incentives for a group to identify perpetrators where they might not do so otherwise. Richard Posner and others consider collective fines to be the most effective type of collective punishment.

The frankpledge system of enforcement was by the 12th century established throughout much of the English realm. Cnut had organized the conquered peoples of England into "hundreds" and tithings, "within a hundred and under surety". Scholars do not know if the surety of Cnut's time was a collective or individual liability, or whether collective punishment was a feature of Anglo-Saxon law, before the Norman Conquest and the 12th century frankpledge system applied collective punishment to the whole tithing. The 13th century Statute of Winchester (1285) stipulated "the whole hundred ... shall be answerable" for any theft or robbery.

=== Destruction of houses ===
According to W. R. Connor "the importance of the oikos in ancient Greece, an importance that goes far beyond the needs for physical shelter and comfort, is well known". The destruction of homes is then "especially awesome and charged with symbolic as well as practical meaning."

The practice of the kataskaphai of houses is attested to by several ancient Greek sources. According to Plutarch's account of the murder of Hesiod (found in the Moralia) the house of the murderers was razed (Greek: οὶκίαν κατέσκαψαν). When the Corinthians kill Cypselus they "razed the houses of the tyrants and confiscated their property", according to Nicholas of Damascus. Sources are inconsistent as to the razing of the Alcamaeonid houses. Of the many sources on the Cylonian conspiracy, only Isocrates mentions kataskaphe.

There have been a large number of home demolitions in Israel since 1967. The legal arguments center on Regulation 119(1) of the Defense Emergency Regulations, an emergency law that dates to the British occupation under the Mandate for Palestine, by which Israel claims the legal authority for home demolitions by the Israeli Defense Force (IDF). In Alamarin v. IDF Commander in Gaza Strip the Israeli High Court of Justice held that the homes of Palestinians who have committed violent acts may be demolished under the Defence (Emergency) Regulations, even if the residence has other inhabitants who are unconnected to the crime. The counterargument against the validity of the regulation is two-fold: firstly, that it should have been properly revoked by 1967 as an institution of the former colonial rule; secondly, that it is incompatible with Israel's modern treaty obligations.

=== Targeting women ===
Some scholars consider the rape of German women by the Red Army during the Russian advance into Germany in 1945 towards the end of World War II as a form of collective punishment. Women were also targeted as a collective punishment for collaboration in Vichy France where photographs were taken of women stripped and paraded through the streets of Paris. A prostitute accused of serving the Germans was kicked to death.

Responding to the 2014 murder of three Israeli teenagers kidnapped near the settlement of Alon Shvut, Israeli professor Mordechai Kedar said: "The only thing that can deter terrorists, like those who kidnapped the children and killed them, is the knowledge that their sister or their mother will be raped. It sounds very bad, but that's the Middle East."

Women are frequently targeted in the Kashmir conflict "to punish and humiliate the entire community". Even in well publicized cases like the Kunan Poshpora mass rape no action has been taken against perpetrators.

=== Schools and education ===
Collective punishment is frequently employed in school environments under the guise of classroom management or behaviour control. Common examples include revoking recess for an entire class due to one student’s behaviour, cancelling group outings after a disruption, or withholding privileges until all students comply. These practices are intended to build peer accountability, but critics argue they have negative consequences for children’s mental health and moral development.

Unlike in legal or military settings, collective punishment in schools is typically informal, undocumented, and lacks oversight. Trauma-informed education researchers note that punitive group sanctions can increase student resentment, anxiety, and disengagement, especially for innocent bystanders. Such practices also undermine trust between students and educators—even dissuading children from reporting misconduct for fear of group reprisal.

Children with disabilities are disproportionately subject to exclusionary school discipline, including informal practices such as shortened days, removal from activities, and being sent home repeatedly. In British Columbia, the provincial Ombudsperson launched a systemic investigation in 2025 after receiving complaints from across the province that students with disabilities were being excluded from school with little or no instruction.

The United Nations Convention on the Rights of the Child prohibits degrading treatment and affirms the right of every child to be treated as an individual. Educational and disability rights organisations have called for trauma-informed, inclusive approaches that reject group punishment in favour of relational, rights-based practices.

== History ==
=== 18th century ===
The Intolerable Acts were seen as a collective punishment of the Massachusetts Colony for the Boston Tea Party. Frederick North and the British Parliament supported collective punishment to deter any further challenges to their imperial authority by undermining support for what they saw as a quarrelsome minority in Massachusetts.

Collective fines were imposed on Edinburgh as punishment for the Porteous riots during which Captain John Porteous was lynched.

=== 19th century ===
The principle of collective punishment was laid out by Union General William Tecumseh Sherman in his Special Field Order 120, November 9, 1864, which laid out the rules for his "March to the sea" in the American Civil War:

V. To army corps commanders alone is entrusted the power to destroy mills, houses, cotton-gins, etc..., and for them this general principle is laid down: In districts and neighborhoods where the army is unmolested, no destruction of such property should be permitted; but should guerrillas or bushwhackers molest our march, or should the inhabitants burn bridges, obstruct roads, or otherwise manifest local hostility, then army commanders should order and enforce a devastation more or less relentless according to the measure of such hostility.

The British (in the Second Boer War) and the Germans (in the Franco-Prussian War) justified such actions as being in accord with the laws of war then in force.

=== 20th century ===
==== World War I ====
The mass shootings of Nicholas Romanov's distant relatives after his abdication in 1917 and the shooting of the Romanov family themselves in July of the following year, 1918, were two such examples of this during World War I.

==== World War II ====
===== By Germany =====
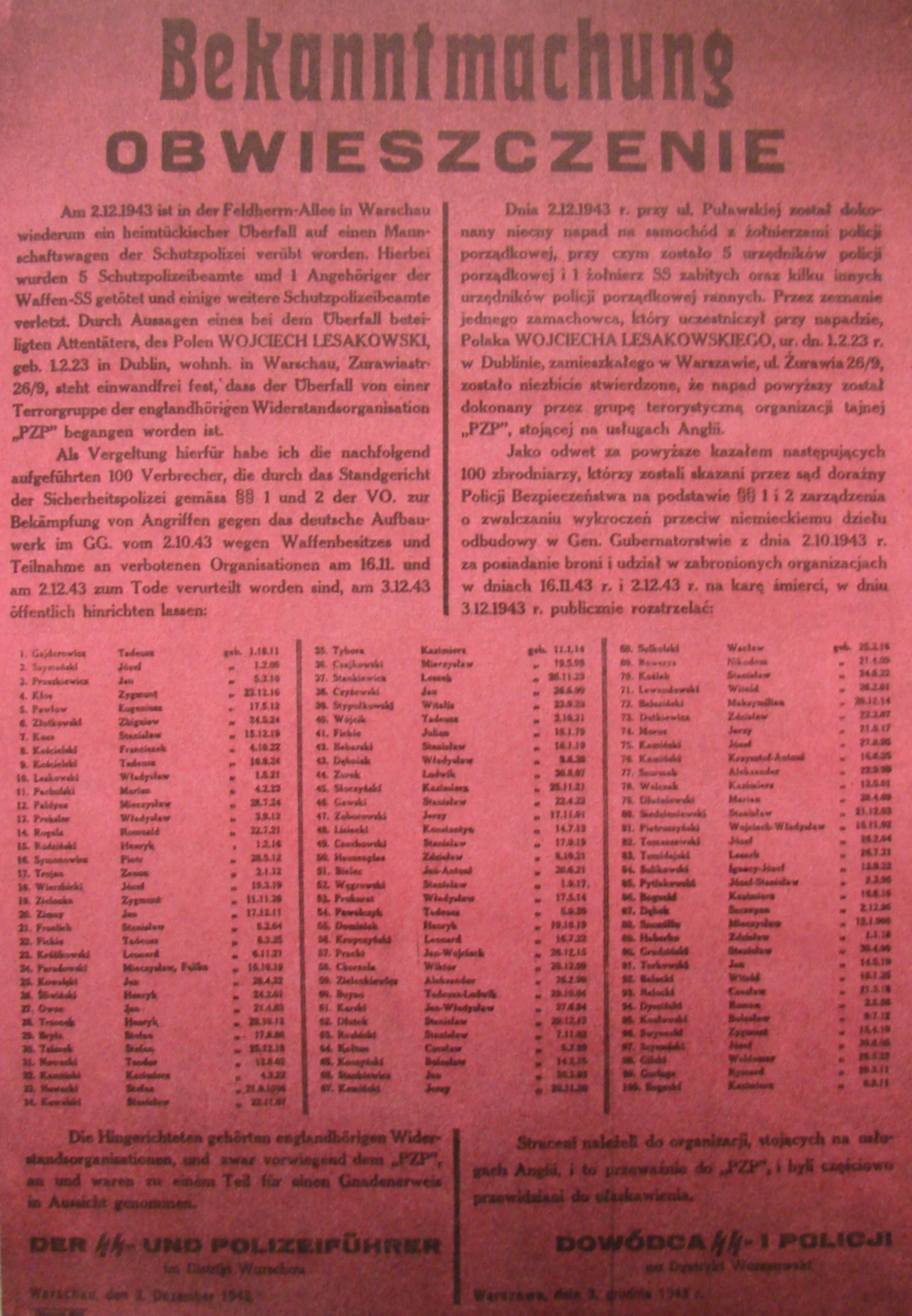
Announcement of execution of 100 Polish roundup hostages, as revenge for the assassination of five German policemen and one SS member by Armia Krajowa resistance fighters in Nazi-occupied Poland. Warsaw, October 2, 1943

During the Nazi occupation of Poland, the Germans applied collective responsibility: any kind of help given to a Jewish person was punishable by death, and that not only for the rescuers themselves but also for their families. This was widely publicized by the Germans. Communities were held collectively responsible for the purported Polish counter-attacks against the invading German troops. Mass executions of roundup (Polish: łapanka) hostages were conducted every single day during the Wehrmacht advance across Poland in September 1939 and thereafter.

Germany also practiced a form of collective punishment against German families. Called Sippenhaft, the family members of Germans who were accused of acting against the state could be punished along with the accused.

Collective punishment was often brutally used during the Nazi occupation of Yugoslavia. The Germans implemented a strategy of reprisals, killing one hundred civilians for every German soldier killed. This was intended to drain support for the partisan movement, resulting in entire regions of Yugoslavia becoming unpopulated. The tactic backfired, as once a German soldier was killed almost the entire local population joined the partisans as the alternative was certain execution by the Germans. This was employed to great effect by the Yugoslav resistance under Josip Broz Tito.

===== Against Germany =====
The expulsion of German speaking population groups after World War II by the Soviet Union, Poland and Czechoslovakia represent one of the greatest examples of collective punishment in terms of the number of victims. The goal was to punish the Germans; the Allies declared them collectively guilty of Nazi war crimes. In the US and UK the ideas of German collective guilt and collective punishment originated not with the American and British people, but on higher policy levels. Not until late in the war did the US public assign collective responsibility to the German people.

===== Soviet Union =====
Joseph Stalin's mass deportations of many nationalities of the USSR to remote regions (including the Chechens, Crimean Tatars, Volga Germans and many others) exemplifies officially orchestrated collective punishment.

Stalin used the partial removal of potentially trouble-making ethnic groups as a technique consistently during his career: Poles (1939–1941 and 1944–45), Romanians (1941 and 1944–1953), Estonians, Latvians, Lithuanians (1941 and 1945–1949), Volga Germans (1941), Chechens, and Ingushes (1944). Shortly before, during and immediately after World War II, Stalin conducted a series of deportations on a huge scale which profoundly affected the ethnic map of the Soviet Union. Between 1941 and 1949 the Soviet authorities deported an estimated nearly 3.3 million people to Siberia and to the Central Asian republics.

The deportations started with Poles from Belarus, Ukraine and European Russia (see Poles in the former Soviet Union) in the period 1932–1936. Koreans in the Russian Far East were deported in 1937 (see Deportation of Koreans in the Soviet Union). After the Soviet invasion of Poland (17 September 1939) following the corresponding German invasion (1 September 1939) that marked the start of World War II in Europe, the Soviet Union annexed eastern parts (the so-called Kresy) of the Second Polish Republic. During 1939–1941 the Soviet regime deported 1.45 million inhabitants of this area, of whom 63% were Poles and 7% were Jews. Similar events followed in the Baltic states of Estonia, Latvia, and Lithuania following their incorporation into the Soviet union in 1940. More than 200,000 people are estimated to have been deported from the Baltic in 1940–1953. 10% of the entire adult Baltic population was deported or sent to labor camps. (See June deportation, Operation Priboi, Soviet deportations from Estonia.) Volga Germans and seven (overwhelmingly Turkic or non-Slavic) nationalities of the Crimea and the northern Caucasus were deported: the Crimean Tatars, Kalmyks, Chechens,

==== India ====
The 1984 anti-Sikh riots, a riot directed against Sikhs in India by anti-Sikh mobs in response to the assassination of Indira Gandhi by her Sikh bodyguards, were an example of collective punishment. The episode resulted in more than 3000 deaths. India's Central Bureau of Investigation (CBI) expressed the opinion that the acts of violence were well-organized, with support from officials in the Delhi police and in the central government at the time, then headed by Indira Gandhi's son, Rajiv Gandhi. When asked about the riots, Rajiv, a Congress party member who was sworn in as the Prime Minister after his mother's death, said: "When a big tree falls, the earth shakes".

Accountability proceedings continued for decades after the riots. In December 2018, the Delhi High Court convicted former Congress politician Sajjan Kumar of murder and other offences for organising the killing of Sikhs during the riots, overturning an earlier trial-court acquittal and sentencing him to life imprisonment; the case was reported as one of the few convictions of a senior political figure over the violence. Kumar appealed his conviction in the Supreme Court of India; however, he died on the morning of 20 August 2026 at the Safdarjung Hospital, on the day his appeal was to be heard. The life imprisonment was awarded in a case relating to the killing of five Sikhs and the burning down of a gurdwara in Palam.

==== Cold War ====
===== United Kingdom =====
In several armed conflicts the United Kingdom engaged during the 1950s, collective punishment was utilized as a tactic to suppress various insurgencies such as the Malayan Emergency, the Mau Mau Uprising, and the Cyprus Emergency. In 1951, the British government announced plans which stipulated that non-combatants found supporting the Malayan National Liberation Army would be subject to 'collective punishment'. During the Mau Mau Uprising, the colonial administration also utilised collective punishment as a tactic against the Kenya Land and Freedom Army, while in Cyprus (during the Cyprus Emergency) the British authorities adopted a tactic of home evictions and business closures in regions where British personnel had been murdered in order to obtain information about the identities of the murderers.

===== Azerbaijan =====
Black January was a massacre of civilians committed by the Red Army in the Azerbaijan Soviet Socialist Republic in 1990. The Human Rights Watch report entitled "Black January in Azerbaijan" states: "Indeed, the violence used by the Soviet Army on the night of January 19–20 was so out of proportion to the resistance offered by Azerbaijanis as to constitute an exercise in collective punishment."

==== South Korea ====
Collective punishment in Korea was officially abolished in 1894 under the Joseon Kingdom, and was only fully abolished in practice on August 22, 1980, after the end of the Park Chung-hee regime. Following this a clause prohibiting collective punishment was added to the Constitution of the Fifth Republic.

==== Israeli–Palestinian conflict ====
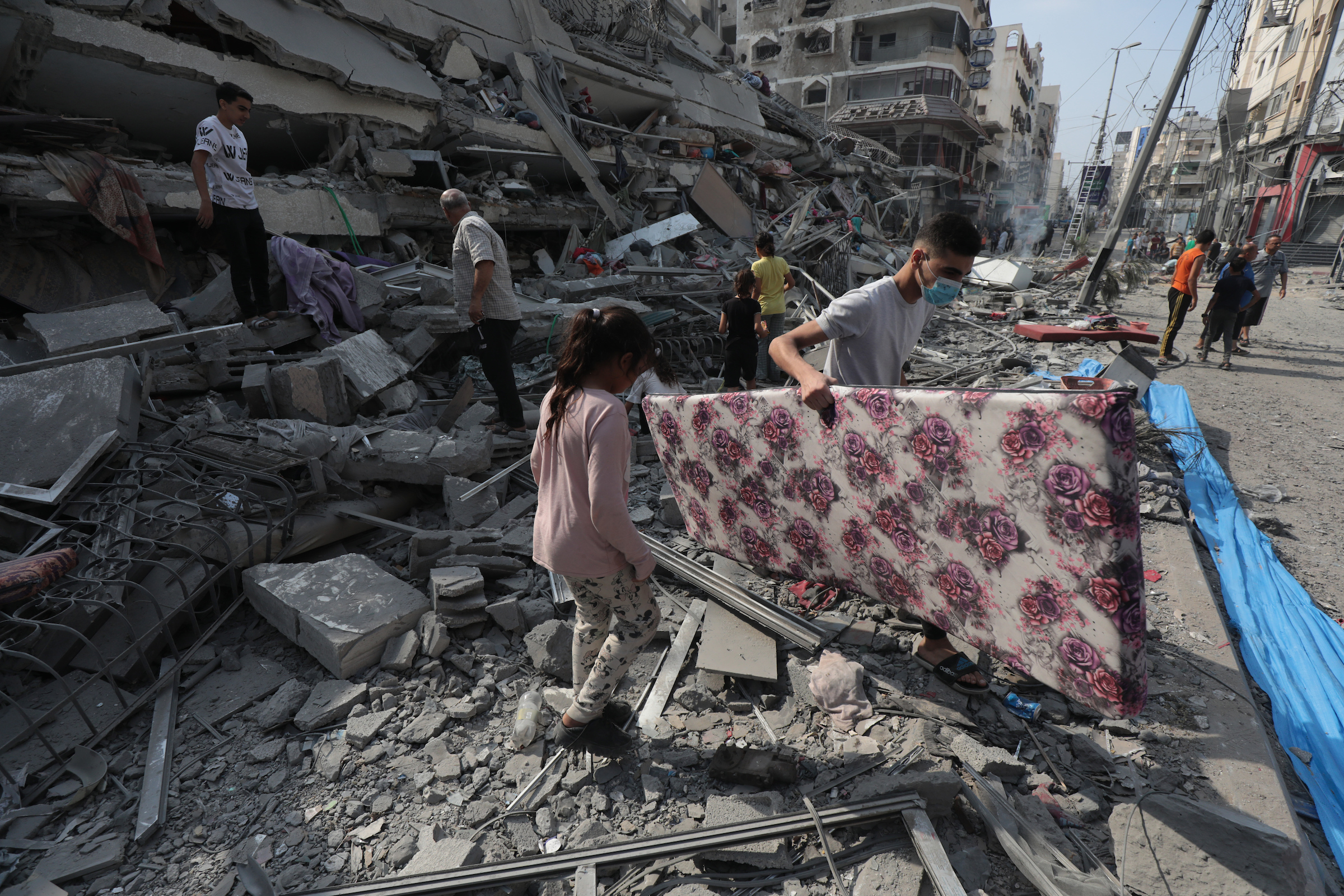
Residents inspect the ruins of an apartment in Gaza destroyed by Israeli airstrikes.

Israel's use of collective punishment measures, such as movement restrictions, shelling of residential areas, mass arrests, and the destruction of public health infrastructure (Note: "The Palestine Red Crescent Society (PRCS) reported 174 documented attacks on their ambulances by Israeli soldiers and settlers between September 29, 2000, and March 15, 2002, resulting in the damage of 78 ambulances. There have also been 166 attacks on their emergency medical technicians (EMT), resulting in three deaths and 134 injuries among PRCS EMTs. Additionally, the PRCS headquarters in Al-Bireh was hit on several occasions by heavy machine gun fire from Israeli soldiers located at the nearby illegal Israeli settlement, Psagot." (Jamjoum 2002, p. 56)) violates Articles 33 and 53 of the Fourth Geneva Convention. Article 33 reads in part:

No protected person may be punished for an offence he or she has not personally committed. Collective penalties and likewise all measures of intimidation or of terrorism are prohibited (Note: Article 53: "Any destruction by the Occupying Power of real or personal property belonging individually or collectively to private persons or to the State, or to other public authorities, or to social or cooperative organizations, is prohibited, except where such destruction is rendered absolutely necessary by military operations." (Shahak 1974, p. 183))

Collective punishment of Palestinians also can be traced back to British mandatory techniques in suppressing the 1936–1939 revolt (Note: "The instability caused by the revolt was augmented by increasingly brutal measures taken during the British counterinsurgency campaign: emergency regulations, military courts, collective punishment, the demolition of houses (and indeed entire neighbourhoods), looting, revenge killings, and the like." (Likhovski 2017, p. 75)) and has been reintroduced and in effect since the early days of the occupation, and was denounced by Israel Shahak as early as 1974. Notoriety for the practice arose in 1988 when, in response to the killing of a suspected collaborator in the village, Israeli forces shut down Qabatiya, arrested 400 of the 7,000 inhabitants, bulldozed the homes of people suspected of involvement, cut all of its telephone lines, banned the importation of any form of food into the village or the export of stone from its quarries to Jordan, shutting off all contact with the outside world for almost 5 weeks (24 February – 3 April). In 2016 Amnesty International stated that the various measures taken in the commercial and cultural heart of Hebron over 20 years of collective punishment have made life so difficult for Palestinians (Note: When the Beit Hadassah settlement was established without Israeli government authority, a barbed wire fence to protect settlers was erected in front of the shops and all Palestinian shoppers had to be frisked before entering them (Playfair 1988, p. 410).) that thousands of businesses and residents have been forcibly displaced, enabling Jewish settlers to take over more properties.

=== 21st century ===
==== Israel ====
Since the Six-Day War of 1967, Israel has occupied the West Bank, East Jerusalem, and the Gaza Strip. During this period, Israel has frequently been accused of imposing collective punishment on Palestinian civilians. Allegations include but are not limited to: the land and sea blockades of Gaza, bombing an individual house when they go home and their entire family is there and killed, the destruction of homes belonging to the families of Palestinians who have attacked Israeli military personnel or civilians, and withholding the bodies of militants.

The benchmark for determining collective punishment in international law is the penalization of individuals for actions in which they bear no individual responsibility. Both international and domestic Israeli law prohibit collective punishment. International humanitarian law prohibits collective punishment under the Fourth Geneva Convention, to which Israel is a party. Regardless of Israel's legal position, all forms of collective punishment are prohibited under international humanitarian law and if carried out, infringe upon a range of human rights, including the right to equal protection under the law and the presumption of innocence. Furthermore, practices such as residency revocation may violate the prohibition on forcible transfers under Article 49 of the Fourth Geneva Convention.

International law grants an occupying power the authority to maintain public order but requires that this authority be balanced against the rights of the civilian population. Israel disputes the accusations of collective punishment, maintaining that its actions do not constitute collective punishment but rather are legal security measures taken in self-defense, and justified by their security needs, terrorism prevention, or are based on laws that were in effect in the Occupied Palestinian Territories before the occupation began. While Israel contends that its measures are solely security-driven, the international community has expressed concerns over whether this justification truly holds. From an international law perspective, these arguments do not negate the possibility that these actions could constitute collective punishment. In practice, the Israeli High Court of Justice applies a domestic test of proportionality and often avoids addressing the customary international prohibition on collective punishment as outlined in Article 33 of the Fourth Geneva Convention.

The current blockade of Gaza has been widely criticized as a form of collective punishment against the Palestinian population. Critics argue that the blockade restricts the movement of people and goods, including essential supplies such as food, medicine, and construction materials, severely impacting the daily lives and humanitarian conditions of Gaza's residents. The International Committee of the Red Cross has described the blockade as a violation of international law, stating that it constitutes a form of collective punishment against the 2.2 million people living in Gaza. Similarly, reports commissioned by the United Nations have highlighted the disproportionate impact of the blockade on civilians, with widespread implications for healthcare, education, and infrastructure.

Various human rights organizations, including Amnesty International and Human Rights Watch, have condemned the blockade as part of a broader policy of punitive measures against Palestinians. These organizations have called for an end to the blockade, asserting that it collectively punishes the civilian population for actions they have not individually committed. Additionally, Israeli military operations in Gaza have been accused of employing measures that amount to collective punishment. For instance, demolitions of homes, targeting of infrastructure, and restrictions on fuel and electricity supplies have further exacerbated the humanitarian crisis in Gaza. Critics argue that these actions violate principles of proportionality and necessity under international law, disproportionately affecting civilians rather than addressing specific security concerns.

Israeli officials, however, maintain that the blockade is a necessary security measure to prevent the smuggling of weapons and materials that could be used by Hamas and other militant groups. While this rationale has been recognized by some states, others have called for alternative measures that do not harm the civilian population. The debate over the legality and morality of the blockade continues to draw international scrutiny, with many advocating for immediate relief to Gaza's humanitarian crisis and a reassessment of policies that affect civilians indiscriminately.

==== Eritrea and Ethiopia ====
An anonymous former member of the Transitional Government of Tigray claimed that Ethiopia and Eritrea used the destruction of the Tigrayan economy as "a tactic to defeat the enemy", arguing they succeeded in taking the region "back 40 years"; Noé Hochet-Bodin of Le Monde described this as an act of "collective punishment". On 27 May 2021, U.S. Assistant Secretary of State Robert F. Godec made the argument that the EDF and ENDF had enacted "[what] amounts to the collective punishment of the people of Tigray" through a "campaign of unremitting violence and destruction".

Beginning in mid-2022, and escalating after mobilization in September that same year, Eritrea engaged in a mass conscription campaign. Human Rights Watch reported that families of those who wished to avoid the draft became targets of collective punishment, with government authorities subjecting them to arbitrary detention and forced evictions from their homes.

==== North Korea ====
In North Korea, political prisoners are sent to the kwalliso concentration camps along with their relatives. North Korea's political penal labor colonies, transliterated kwalliso or kwan-li-so, constitute one of three forms of political imprisonment in the country, the other two being what Hawk (2012) translates as "short-term detention/forced-labor centers" and "long-term prison labor camps" for misdemeanor and felony offences respectively. In total, there are an estimated 150,000 to 200,000 political prisoners housed within the North Korean imprisonment system. In contrast to these other systems, the condemned are sent there without any form of judicial process as are their immediate three generations of family members as kin punishment. North Korea's kwalliso consist of a series of sprawling encampments measuring kilometers long and kilometers wide. The number of these encampments has varied over time. They are located mainly in the valleys between high mountains, mostly in the northern provinces of North Korea. There are between 5,000 and 50,000 prisoners per kwalliso, totaling perhaps some 150,000 to 200,000 prisoners throughout North Korea. The kwalliso are usually surrounded at their outer perimeters by barbed-wire fences punctuated with guard towers and patrolled by heavily armed guards. The encampments include self-contained closed "village" compounds for single persons, usually the alleged wrongdoers, and other closed, fenced-in "villages" for the extended families of the wrongdoers.

North Korea sanctions severely limit the import of essential goods such as food, medical supplies, and fuel, which exacerbates the chronic hardships faced by millions of civilians. For instance, restrictions on agricultural imports and fertilizers undermine food production, leading to widespread malnutrition and food insecurity. The UN Food Program reported that 10 million North Koreans, or 40% of the population, were food insecure due to systemic issues worsened by sanctions. Similarly, bans on medical equipment and pharmaceuticals hinder access to healthcare, disproportionately affecting vulnerable groups like children, the elderly, and pregnant women. Humanitarian organizations, including Amnesty International, have criticized sanctions for delaying or blocking essential humanitarian aid.

These outcomes are not incidental but are foreseeable consequences of the sanctions regime, as the impact is felt most acutely by civilians rather than the ruling elite who remain insulated from the economic hardship through control of illicit trade networks and state resources.

==== Pakistan ====
On May 20, 2008, the Pakistan Army conducted collective punishment against a village called Spinkai, located in the Federally Administered Tribal Areas of Pakistan. The operation was called 'zalzala', which is Arabic for earthquake. At first, the Pakistan Army swept through with helicopter gunships, artillery and tanks. After four days of heavy fighting, 25 militants and six soldiers died. The rest of the militants retreated up the valley. After the capture of the village the army discovered bomb factories, detonation-ready suicide jackets and schools for teenage suicide bombers.

The Pakistan Army immediately decided to punish the village for harboring the Taliban and allowing the militants to operate in and from the village to conduct further terror attacks in Pakistan. Bulldozers and explosives experts turned Spinkai's bazaar into a mile-long pile of rubble. Petrol stations, shops, and even parts of the hospital were leveled or blown up. The villagers were forbidden from returning to their homes.

==== South Africa ====
South Africa still retains the Apartheid-era law of common purpose, by which those who make up part of a group can be punished for the crimes of other group members, even if they were not themselves actively involved. In August 2012 this came to public attention when 270 miners were threatened with prosecution for participating in a demonstration. During the demonstration at the Marikana mine, 34 miners were shot by police. Many of the miners were armed. When prosecutors said they would pursue charges against other miners who were part of the protest, there was a public outcry.

==== Syria ====
Throughout most of the civil war, collective punishment was a recurring method used by the Syrian government to quell opposition in cities and suburbs throughout the country, whereby entire cities are besieged, shelled, and destroyed if that city is deemed as pro-opposition.

Upon retaking the capital Damascus after the 2012 Battle of Damascus, the Syrian government began a campaign of collective punishment against Sunni suburbs in and around the capital which had supported Free Syrian Army presence in their neighborhoods.

In opposition-controlled cities and districts in Aleppo Province and Aleppo city, reports indicate that the Syrian government attacked civilians at bread bakeries with artillery rounds and rockets, with the reports indicating that the bakeries were shelled indiscriminately. Human Rights Watch said these are war crimes, as the only military targets were the few rebels manning the bakeries, and that dozens of civilians were killed.

In Idlib province in the northwest of the country, entire cities were shelled and bombed for sheltering opposition activists and rebels, with the victims mostly civilians, along with heavy financial losses.

== See also ==
- Achan
- Achor
- Civilian victimization
- Dahiya doctrine
- Decimation (Roman army)
- Divine retribution
- Family members of traitors to the Motherland
- Gaza humanitarian crisis (2023–present)
- Market share liability
- Nulla poena sine culpa
- Terrorism
