= Battle of Zephath =

Battle of the Valley of Zephath
- Kingdom of Judah in yellow as indicated in the map
Date	Early 9th century BC, between 911–870 BC during the reign of King Asa of Judah
Location	Valley of Zephath near Maresha, Kingdom of Judah (now Israel)
Result	Judah victory; Egyptian incursions into Judah are halted until mid-6th century BC.
Territorial changes	Egyptians and Kushites fail to invade Judah

Belligerents
Kingdom of Judah	Twenty-second Dynasty of Egypt with Kushite contingents

Commanders and leaders
King Asa of Judah	Zerah the Ethiopian (may have actually been the Pharaohs Osorkon I or Osorkon II)

Strength
Unknown	Unknown

Casualties and losses
Unknown	Unknown

The Battle of Zephath, according to the Hebrew Bible (2 Chronicles 14:9–15), occurred during the period of 911-870 BCE in the reign of King Asa of Judah. It was fought in the Valley of Zephath near Maresha in modern-day Israel between the armies of the Kingdom of Judah under the command of King Asa and that of the Kushites and ancient Egyptians under the command of Zerah the Cushite, who, given the time frame with Asa's reign, may have been a military commander under Osorkon I.

The warriors of Judah were victorious in the battle, utterly defeating the Egyptians and Kushites, which the Chronicler attributes to divine intervention, and Asa's forces collected a large volume of war spoils. Asa's forces pursued the enemy stragglers as far as the coastal city of Gerar, where they halted due to exhaustion. The result of the battle created peace between Judah and Egypt until the time of Josiah some centuries later, when Egypt would again make encroachments in the region.

== See also ==
- Battle of Mount Zemaraim
- Ancient Egypt
- Kingdom of Israel (Samaria)
