= Joshua 8 =

Book of Joshua, chapter 8

- ← chapter 7 chapter 9 →
- The pages containing the Book of Joshua in Leningrad Codex (1008 CE).
- Book: Book of Joshua
- Hebrew Bible part: Nevi'im
- Order in the Hebrew part: 1
- Category: Former Prophets
- Christian Bible part: Old Testament
- Order in the Christian part: 6

Joshua 8 is the eighth chapter of the Book of Joshua in the Hebrew Bible or in the Old Testament of the Christian Bible. According to Jewish tradition the book was attributed to Joshua, with additions by the high priests Eleazar and Phinehas, but modern scholars view it as part of the Deuteronomistic History, which spans the books of Deuteronomy to 2 Kings, attributed to nationalistic and devotedly Yahwistic writers during the time of the reformer Judean king Josiah in 7th century BCE. This chapter focuses on the conquest of Ai under the leadership of Joshua and the renewal of covenant on Mounts Ebal and Gerizim, a part of a section comprising Joshua 5:13–12:24 about the conquest of Canaan.

== Text ==
This chapter was originally written in the Hebrew language. It is divided into 35 verses.

=== Textual witnesses ===
Some early manuscripts containing the text of this chapter in Hebrew are of the Masoretic Text tradition, which includes the Codex Cairensis (895), Aleppo Codex (10th century), and Codex Leningradensis (1008). Fragments containing parts of this chapter in Hebrew were found among the Dead Sea Scrolls including 4Q47 (4QJosh^{a}; 200–100 BCE) with extant verses 3–14, 18, also 34–35 (before 5:1).

Extant ancient manuscripts of a translation into Koine Greek known as the Septuagint (originally was made in the last few centuries BCE) include Codex Vaticanus (B; $\mathfrak{G}$^{B}; 4th century) and Codex Alexandrinus (A; $\mathfrak{G}$^{A}; 5th century). (Note: The whole book of Joshua is missing from the extant Codex Sinaiticus.) Fragments of the Septuagint Greek text containing this chapter is found in manuscripts such as Washington Manuscript I (5th century CE), and a reduced version of the Septuagint text is found in the illustrated Joshua Roll.

== Analysis ==
The narrative of the Israelites conquering the land of Canaan comprises verses 5:13 to 12:24 of the Book of Joshua and has the following outline:

A. Jericho (5:13–6:27)
B. Achan and Ai (7:1–8:29)

1. The Sin of Achan (7:1-26)

a. Narrative Introduction (7:1)
b. Defeat at Ai (7:2-5)
c. Joshua's Prayer (7:6-9)
d. Process for Identifying the Guilty (7:10-15)
e. The Capture of Achan (7:16-21)
f. Execution of Achan and His Family (7:22-26)

2. The Capture of Ai (8:1-29)

a. Narrative Introduction (8:1-2)
b. God's Plan for Capturing the City (8:3-9)
c. Implementation of God's Plan (8:10-13)
d. The Successful Ambush (8:14-23)
e. Destruction of Ai (8:24-29)

C. Renewal at Mount Ebal (8:30–35)

1. Building the Altar (8:30-31)
2. Copying the Torah (8:32-33)
3. Reading the Torah (8:34-35)

D. The Gibeonite Deception (9:1–27)
E. The Campaign in the South (10:1–43)
F. The Campaign in the North and Summary List of Kings (11:1–12:24)

The narrative of Joshua 7–8 combines the story of Achan's offence against the 'devoted things', and the battle report concerning Ai, as the two themes are linked.

The firsf part of this chapter concerning the Battle against Ai has the following structure:

1. YHWH encourages Joshua and command him to take Ai by ambush (8:1–2)
2. Joshua organizes Israel for battle as YHWH commanded (8:3–13)
3. Israel carries out the tactics of YHWH (8:14–17)
4. YHWH directs Israel to victory through Joshua (8:18–23)
5. The report of victory (8:24–29)

The second part (8:30–35) is an interlude for divine worship before the next military campaigns, taking place on two mountains, involving an altar, sacrifice, a copy of Torah and pronouncement of God's blessings and curses.

== Fall of Ai (8:1–29) ==
With the problem in Joshua 7 resolved, God is with his people again in the conquest of the land, so Ai, like Jericho before it, will fall to the Israelites (verse 2). The narrative contains military and topographical details, as YHWH takes charge in the taking of Ai (verses 1–2), in contrast to the previous attempt, where Joshua took charge. Unlike Jericho, the people of Israel may take plunder after conquering Ai. Using the stratagem of pretended flight (cf. Judges 20:36–38), simulating the first defeat (verse 6, cf. 7:4–5), the Israel tricked the men of Ai to leave the city void of defense, so a second unit of Israelite army could get in from the west (opposite direction of a direct confrontation) and conquer the city, then went out to pinch the men of Ai from two sides and killed them all. Two memorials of the victory against Ai are established: the ash piles of the burnt city; and a heap of stones for the dead king of Ai (verses 28–29).

The report related to the sending of the unit for the ambush consists of two versions (one in verses 3–9 and the other in verses 10–13) which are both preserved in succession, starting and closing with similar phrases ("Joshua rose" in verses 3 and 10; "Joshua…that night… in the middle" in verses 9 and 13).

=== Verse 28 ===
So Joshua burned Ai and made it a heap forever, a desolation to this day.

- "A heap forever": that is, "permanent mound" or "permanently uninhabited mound".

== The covenant renewal at Mount Ebal (8:30–35) ==
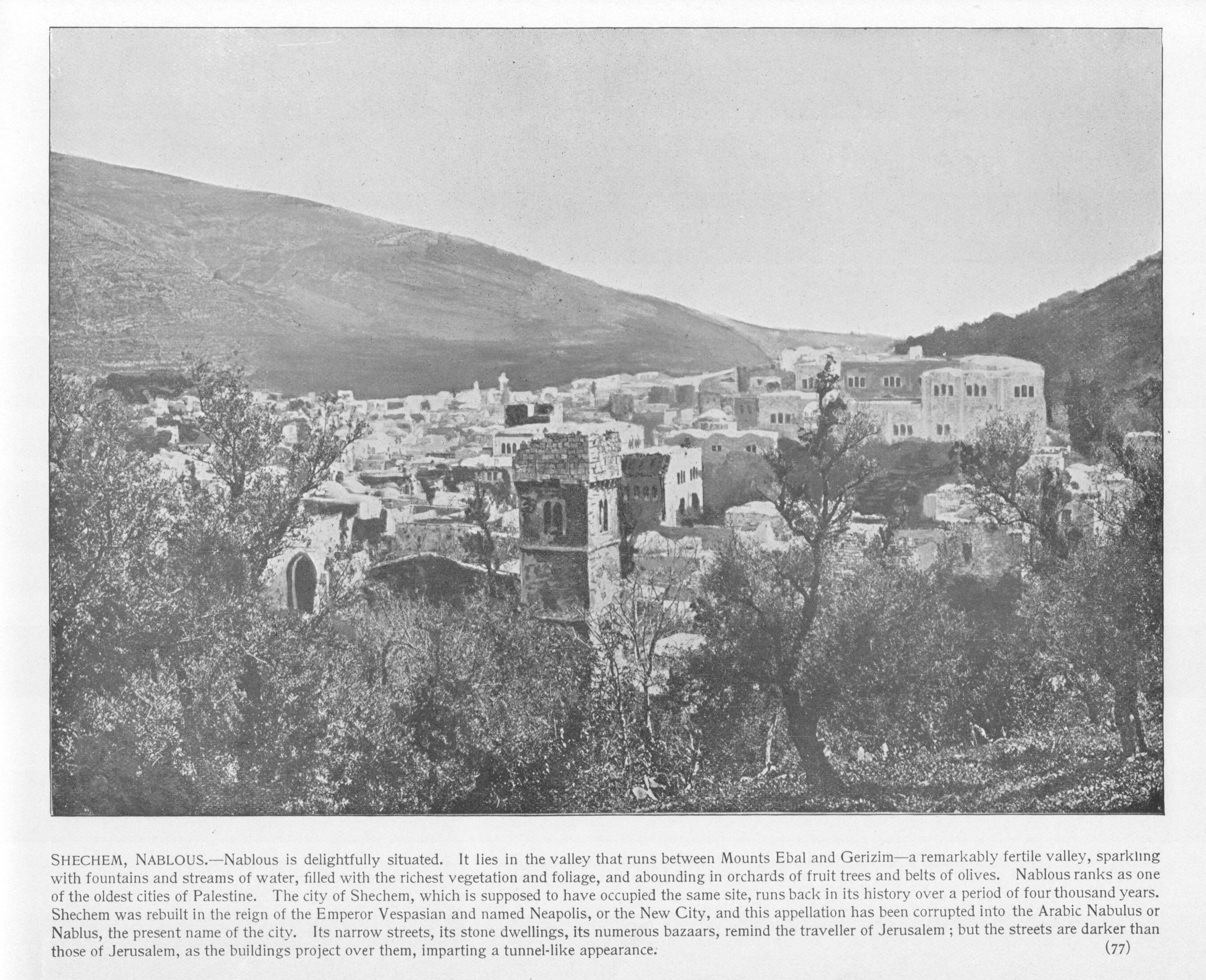
Mount Ebal (north) and Gerizim (south) with the city of Shechem (now: Nablus) in the middle, photographed by Daniel B. Shepp. 1894.

The taking of Ai (and the implied defeat of Bethel as well) marks an important point in the conquest, that the ceremony reported here could be performed following the instruction in the Book of Deuteronomy, that 'on the day that you cross over the Jordan', the people should setup large stones on Mount Ebal, cover them with plaster, and write 'all the words of this law' on them, then to erect an altar for sacrifice (Deuteronomy 27:2–8), and solemnly reaffirm the covenant with God (Deuteronomy 27:11–26). The ceremony on Mounts Ebal and Gerizim, near ancient Shechem, made the 'book of the law', first only for Joshua himself as he led Israel into the land (Joshua 1:7-8), to become the rule for the whole people of Israel, which would lead to another covenant renewal ceremony at Shechem at the end of the book (Joshua 24).

=== Verses 30–31 ===
^{30} Then Joshua built an altar to the Lord God of Israel on Mount Ebal, ^{31} as Moses the servant of the Lord had commanded the children of Israel. As is written in the Book of the Law of Moses, it was “an altar of uncut stones not shaped by iron tools.” They sacrificed burnt offerings to the Lord on it, as well as peace offerings.

- "Uncut stones": that is, "whole stones” in their natural condition, not carved or shaped artificially with iron tools (“wielded iron”).

== Archaeology ==
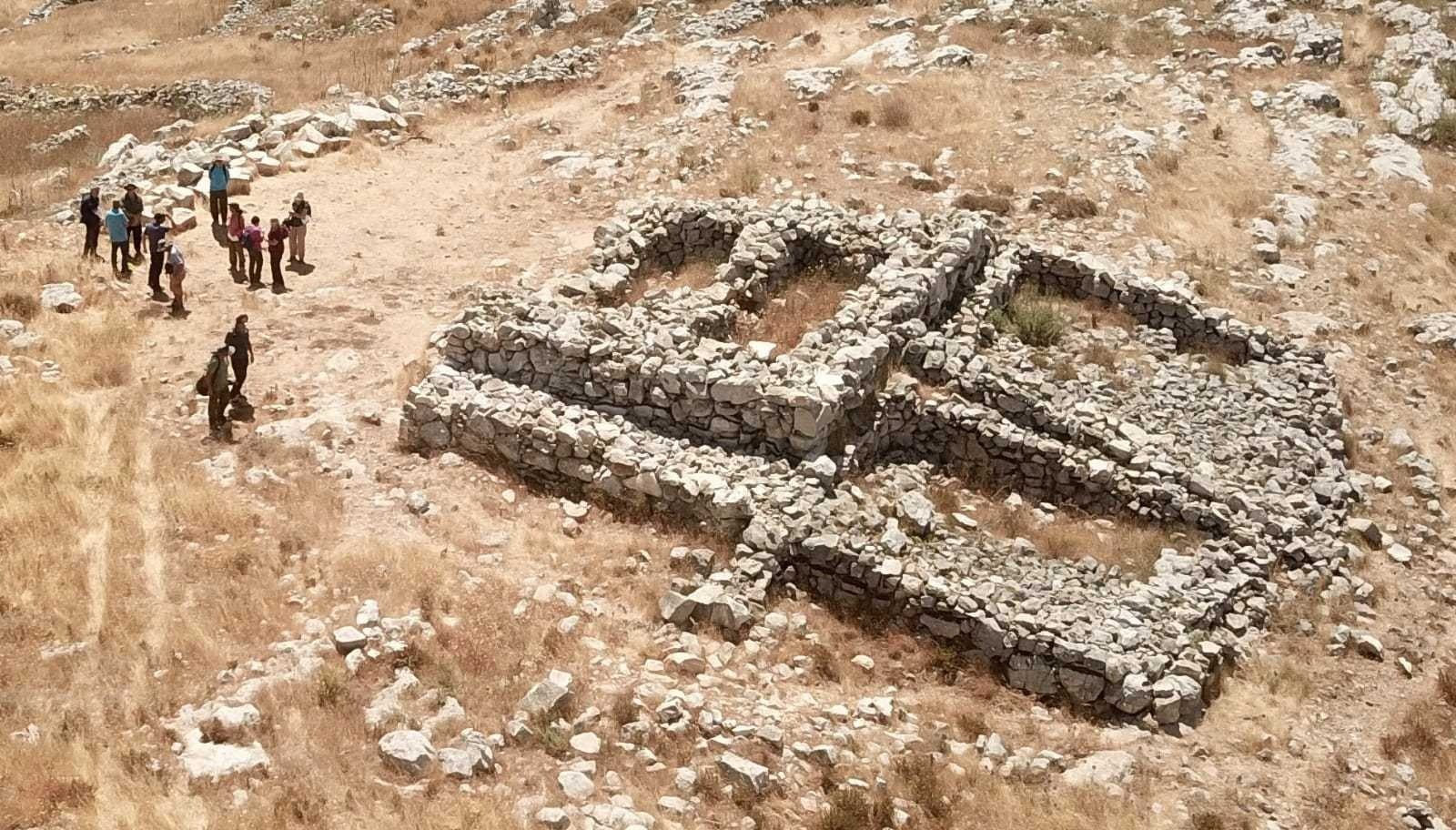
Ancient altar on Mount Ebal.

Archaeological works in the 1930s at the location of Et-Tell or Khirbet Haijah showed that the city of Ai, an early target for conquest in the putative Joshua account, had existed and been destroyed, but in the 22nd century BCE. Some alternate sites for Ai, such as Khirbet el-Maqatir or Khirbet Nisya, have been proposed which would partially resolve the discrepancy in dates, but these sites have not been widely accepted.

== See also ==
- Ambush
- Ark of the Covenant
- Bethel
- Blessing
- Children of Israel
- Curse
- Israelites
- Jericho
- Kohen
- Korban
- Levites
- Moses
- Mount Ebal
- Mount Ebal site
- Mount Gerizim
- Slaughter offering
- Torah
- Related Bible parts: Joshua 6, Joshua 7

== Sources ==
- Beal, Lissa M. Wray (2019). Longman, Tremper III; McKnight, Scot (eds.). Joshua. The Story of God Bible Commentary. Zondervan Academic. ISBN 978-0310490838.
- Coogan, Michael David (2007). Coogan, Michael David; Brettler, Marc Zvi; Newsom, Carol Ann; Perkins, Pheme (eds.). The New Oxford Annotated Bible with the Apocryphal/Deuterocanonical Books: New Revised Standard Version, Issue 48 (Augmented 3rd ed.). Oxford University Press. ISBN 978-0195288810.
- Firth, David G. (2021). Joshua: Evangelical Biblical Theology Commentary. Evangelical Biblical Theology Commentary (EBTC) (illustrated ed.). Lexham Press. ISBN 9781683594406.
- Fitzmyer, Joseph A. (2008). A Guide to the Dead Sea Scrolls and Related Literature. Grand Rapids, MI: William B. Eerdmans Publishing Company. ISBN 9780802862419.
- Halley, Henry H. (1965). Halley's Bible Handbook: an abbreviated Bible commentary (24th (revised) ed.). Zondervan Publishing House. ISBN 0-310-25720-4.
- Harstad, Adolph L. (2004). Joshua. Concordia Publishing House. ISBN 978-0570063193.
- Hayes, Christine (2015). Introduction to the Bible. Yale University Press. ISBN 978-0300188271.
- McConville, Gordon (2007). "9. Joshua". In Barton, John; Muddiman, John (eds.). The Oxford Bible Commentary (first (paperback) ed.). Oxford University Press. pp. 158–176. ISBN 978-0199277186.
- Rösel, Hartmut N. (2011). Joshua. Historical commentary on the Old Testament. Vol. 6 (illustrated ed.). Peeters. ISBN 978-9042925922.
- Ulrich, Eugene, ed. (2010). The Biblical Qumran Scrolls: Transcriptions and Textual Variants. Brill.
- Würthwein, Ernst (1995). The Text of the Old Testament. Translated by Rhodes, Erroll F. Grand Rapids, MI: Wm. B. Eerdmans. ISBN 0-8028-0788-7.
