= Corporate election =

Christian theological doctrine

Corporate election is a position in Christian soteriology holding that salvation is grounded in God's choice of a corporate body, the church, rather than in the unconditional selection of particular individuals. On this view, Christ is the elect one par excellence, and believers become members of the elect only by virtue of their union with him; election is "corporate" in the sense that the group is chosen primarily, and individuals only secondarily, as participants in that group. The central proof text is Ephesians 1:4, "He chose us in him before the creation of the world to be holy and blameless in his sight", which proponents read as describing the church's pre-temporal election in Christ rather than the election of discrete persons.

The doctrine has been developed mainly by Arminian and other non-Calvinist scholars, notably William W. Klein and Brian Abasciano, as an alternative to the individual-election positions shared, despite their other differences, by classical Calvinism and classical Arminianism. It has also been associated with the Barthian Christocentric account of election and with older Anglican teaching on "ecclesiastical election."

== Summary of the corporate view of election ==
=== Election is Christocentric ===
Corporate election is Christocentric: it begins not with a decree about individuals but with the affirmation that Christ himself is "the Chosen One" of God, the figure to whom Old Testament election language (e.g. Isaiah 42:1) and several New Testament texts are applied. Believers are elect only as they are united to him by faith; election and its blessings belong properly to "the Beloved" and are extended to others only "in him." A parallel, though independently developed, Christocentric account was articulated by Karl Barth, who held in Church Dogmatics II/2 that Jesus Christ is simultaneously "the electing God and elected man," rejecting any hidden decree of election or reprobation behind or apart from Christ himself.

=== Election is primarily corporate ===
Proponents argue that biblical election language is, in the overwhelming majority of cases, plural and corporate. In the Hebrew Bible the elect are normally "Israel" as a people rather than particular Israelites, and the few passages choosing an individual (such as Cyrus) concern a historical task, not eternal salvation. In the New Testament, the elect are addressed as "the body of Christ" (Ephesians 4:12), "members of God's household" (Ephesians 2:19), and "a chosen race, a royal priesthood, a holy nation" (1 Peter 2:9). Klein concludes that the New Testament writers treat election "in primarily, if not exclusively, corporate terms": God has chosen a people to save, and individuals belong to the elect only by belonging to that people.

Abasciano refines this into the idea of a "corporate representative": a group is elect because of its identification with a representative head, and individuals are elect because of their identification both with the representative and with the group. He compares this to God's choice of Israel "in" the patriarchs (Deuteronomy 4:37; 7:6–8), where the nation's election follows from, and is inseparable from, the election of Jacob/Israel as its head. This is a pattern of corporate solidarity that, on this reading, recurs in the church's election "in Christ."

=== Election has an eternal purpose ===
The purpose of election, on this view, is that the chosen people should "declare the praises of him" who called them and "be holy and blameless before him", a purpose elaborated throughout Ephesians and 1 Peter. Proponents distinguish between the church's "corporate destiny", which is certain, and the "individual" believer's share in that destiny, which remains conditional on continuing in the faith.

=== Election is offered to all people ===
Because election is understood as a status conferred through union with Christ rather than an antecedent, unconditional selection of particular people, advocates argue that it coheres readily with texts describing God's salvific will as universal; that he desires all to be saved and calls all to repentance. Only those who repent and trust in Christ are, in fact, incorporated into the elect body by the Holy Spirit.

== Historical perspectives on election ==
Historically, both Calvinists and Arminians have predominantly understood election unto salvation as individual. That is, each person is selected to enter into a saving relationship with God through Christ, the two traditions differing chiefly over whether that election is unconditional (Calvinism) or conditioned on God's foreknowledge of faith (Arminianism). Corporate election, while not the traditional Arminian position, is nonetheless consistent with Arminian theology, since it too makes election conditional upon faith in Christ. Indeed, some theologians argue that corporate and individual election operate simultaneously and are mutually complementary.

Anglican theology historically developed its own corporate doctrine, sometimes called "ecclesiastical election": every baptized member of the visible church is reckoned among God's elect by virtue of baptism, so that the elect and the baptized church are coextensive, election here referring to admission into covenant privilege rather than to a guarantee of final glory. This reading was traced by its defenders to Hermas and Justin Martyr. It was reflected in the canons of the second Council of Orange (529), which affirmed that all the baptized can, by grace, be saved, while anathematizing the teaching that God predestines anyone to damnation, a position closer to corporate or "ecclesiastical" election than to either later Calvinism or strict Augustinianism.

In the 20th and 21st centuries, corporate election has been developed chiefly by Arminian scholars and others sympathetic to corporate readings: among them B. J. Oropeza, Ben Witherington, William G. MacDonald, Herman Ridderbos, Robert Shank, William W. Klein and Brian Abasciano. This is partly owing to a renewed scholarly emphasis on the corporate, rather than individualist, social context of Second Temple Judaism and the early church.

== Arguments in support of corporate election ==
=== The Old Testament concept of election ===
Advocates of a corporate view of election argue that the Old Testament concept of election is definitely corporate: Israel as a nation, not the individual Israelite, is the normal object of election language (Deuteronomy 7:6; 10:15; 14:2; Isaiah 41:8–9). The Old Testament's corporate vocabulary for Israel ("bride," "congregation," "flock," "house," "vine," "people") likewise confirms that the writers conceived of the nation as a single elect entity, and the Old Testament displays a strong sense of corporate solidarity, in which the standing of the group and that of its individual members are bound together; the consequences of Achan's sin for all Israel (Joshua 7) are a frequently cited illustration of this principle.

=== New Testament language on election ===
Supporters of the corporate view point to the New Testament's election vocabulary (eklegomai, eklektos, eklogē), used almost exclusively in the plural and almost never to designate an individual's salvation. Paul addresses believers collectively as "the elect of God" (Romans 8:33) and speaks of "your [plural] election" (1 Thessalonians 1:4) and of the church's election "in him" (Ephesians 1:4), never of any individual's election considered apart from the church. Other corporate images reinforce the point: the church as a single body with many members (1 Corinthians 12:12–27).

=== Cultural and religious setting for the New Testament ===
Supporters of a corporate understanding of election also argue that first-century Mediterranean and Jewish culture was corporate rather than individualistic in outlook: a person's identity was derived chiefly from the group (family, people, or covenant community) to which they belonged, rather than the group's identity being constructed from autonomous individuals. Jewish sectarian literature from this period, such as the Community Rule among the Dead Sea Scrolls, similarly frames election as God's choice of a covenant community ("the sons of light") rather than of isolated persons, while Greco-Roman voluntary associations offered a familiar social pattern of communal membership and elected office that may have shaped how early Christians imagined the ekklesia as an elect corporate body. Proponents contrast this with the individualism of contemporary mystery cults, which centered on private initiation rather than incorporation into a people. Taken together, these features are presented as evidence that an original audience would have heard New Testament election language corporately rather than individualistically.

Beyond the linguistic and cultural case, defenders also argue that corporate election coheres well with other doctrines: with a universal or general atonement, since the elect body is open to all who will believe rather than restricted in advance to a fixed number.

== Arguments against corporate election ==
=== Corporate election excludes individuals ===
Critics, predominantly Reformed theologians, argue that corporate election does not adequately account for texts that appear to describe God's choice of specific individuals, such as Jesus' statement "I chose you" to the Twelve (John 15:16) or Paul's treatment of Jacob and Esau as individuals illustrating God's electing purpose (Romans 9:11–13), and that it risks making membership in the elect group contingent on autonomous human decision. Proponents respond that corporate election does not exclude individuals: it includes them, but only insofar as they participate in the group, so that the group is elect primarily and individuals secondarily, by their identification with the corporate representative, Christ.

=== Corporate election as the election of an empty set ===
A frequently raised objection, associated particularly with Thomas R. Schreiner, is the "empty set" problem: if the corporate body is constituted only as individuals freely join it by faith, then God's act of election, considered at the moment of the decree, chooses a group with no actual members, rendering election in some sense hypothetical or merely provisional. Proponents reply that the objection misconceives the model, since the group is never empty: it is constituted from the outset by its head, Christ, in whom the church's election, like Israel's election "in" Jacob, has content and certainty from its very inception, even before any individual has yet believed.

== Relation to other theological issues ==
=== Predestination ===
Within this framework, predestination concerns not who will become a Christian but what God has determined for those who are in Christ: their conformity to Christ's image, their adoption as sons, and the praise of God's glory. As with election generally, the corporate destiny of the church is treated as certain, while an individual's share in it remains tied to perseverance in faith.

=== Perseverance and apostasy ===
Several proponents connect corporate election to a conditional view of perseverance: since election and predestination belong properly to the corporate body and only derivatively to individual members, the New Testament's warnings against apostasy are read as real possibilities for individual believers, comparable to the apostasy of individual Israelites who could be "broken off" from the elect nation without the corporate election of Israel, or of the church, being thereby nullified.

== See also ==
- Predestination
- Unconditional election
- Conditional election

== Notes and references ==
=== Sources ===
- Abasciano, Brian J. (2006). "Corporate Election in Romans 9: A Reply to Thomas Schreiner". Journal of the Evangelical Theological Society. 49 (2).
- Abasciano, Brian J. (2009). "Clearing Up Misconceptions about Corporate Election". Ashland Theological Journal. 41.
- Barth, Karl (1957). Church Dogmatics II/2: The Doctrine of God. Edinburgh: T&T Clark.
- Browne, Edward Harold (1874). An Exposition of the Thirty-nine Articles: Historical and Doctrinal. New York: E. P. Dutton.
- Demarest, Bruce (1997). The Cross and Salvation. Foundations of Evangelical Theology. Wheaton, IL: Crossway.
- Forster, Roger T.; Marston, Paul (2000). God's Strategy in Human History (expanded ed.). Eugene, Oregon: Wipf and Stock.
- Klein, William W. (1990). The New Chosen People: A Corporate View of Election. Grand Rapids: Academie Books/Zondervan.
- Malina, Bruce J. (2001). The New Testament World: Insights from Cultural Anthropology (3rd ed.). Louisville: Westminster John Knox Press.
- Olson, Roger E. (2009). Arminian Theology: Myths and Realities. Downers Grove, Illinois: InterVarsity Press.
- Oropeza, B. J. (2000). Paul and Apostasy: Eschatology, Perseverance, and Falling Away in the Corinthian Congregation. Tübingen: Mohr Siebeck.
- Picirilli, Robert E. (2002). Grace, Faith, Free Will: Contrasting Views of Salvation: Calvinism and Arminianism. Nashville: Randall House Publications.
- Schreiner, Thomas R. (2006). "Corporate and Individual Election in Romans 9: A Response to Brian Abasciano". Journal of the Evangelical Theological Society. 49 (2).
- Shank, Robert (1970). Elect in the Son: A Study of the Doctrine of Election. Minneapolis: Bethany House Publishers.
- Stamps, Donald C. (2003). Life in the Spirit Study Bible. Grand Rapids: Zondervan.
- Witherington, Ben (2005). The Problem with Evangelical Theology: Testing the Exegetical Foundations of Calvinism, Dispensationalism and Wesleyanism. Waco: Baylor University Press.
