= Alamarin v. IDF Commander in Gaza Strip =

1992 Israeli court case

Mohammad Alamarin v. IDF Commander in Gaza Strip was a 1992 case argued before Israel's High Court of Justice. Justice G. Bach delivered the majority opinion. Mohammad Alamarin filed a petition seeking to prevent the confiscation and demolition of his family's home after his son confessed to murdering 15 year old Helena Rapp. The HCJ held that the IDF commander acted within his authority under r.119 of the Defence (Emergency) Regulations when he ordered the demolition of the petitioner's sons home.

== Background ==
Mohammed Alamarin's son, Fuad, was arrested by the police after the murder of 15 year old Helena Rapp. On the morning of the murder Fuad left his house with two knives he had taken from the kitchen of his home. With the knives on his person, he traveled by taxi to Bat Yam in Israel. He told police he decided to kill the girl because he was unable to find work. Fuad admitted that he left his home with the knife because he wanted to hurt "Jews or an Israeli Arab." He confessed to stabbing Helena three to four times before running away. In his statement Fuad said he "continued stabbing her even when she fell."

After Fuad's confession IDF Commander ordered the house sealed pending demolition. The confiscation and demolition of Fuad's house was authorized by the military commander under the Defence (Emergency) Regulations.

Fuad's family who also lived in the same house challenged the demolition order, arguing that Fuad was not the sole resident of the house. After the legal adviser in Gaza rejected the family's petition, Fuad's father filed his petition in the High Court of Justice (HCJ). The demolition was barred pending the outcome of his case before the HCJ.

The Defence (Emergency) Regulations of 1945 authorized the IDF commander in this case to destroy a building inhabited by a person who has committed a violent offense. The family's petition objected to the demolition on two grounds.

1. They argued that the sealing, confiscation and destruction of Fuad's family home was not permitted under r.119 of the Regulations because Fuad had committed the murder in Israel. This argument relied on the territorial limitation of the Regulations.
2. They further argued that the Regulations would only permit the confiscation and destruction of the guilty party's room, not the entire building. Many members of Fuad's family shared the residence and they had not taken part in Fuad's actions.

== Issue ==
Does r. 119 of the Regulations permit the destruction of a house in the occupied territory of Gaza for a violent offense that was committed in Israel by a resident of that house?

== The High Court Decision ==
=== Majority ===
The HCJ ruled that the demolition was reasonable under the circumstances. The majority opinion was written by Justice G. Bach.

In its opinion the HCJ wrote that an offense was committed under r.59(b) of the Regulations when Fuad left his home carrying a "particularly long knife" with the intention of killing or causing serious injury for a person, within the meaning of r.59(b):

"No person shall -
..................
(b) have in his possession any weapon, instrument or article or thing designed or adapted for causing death or serious injury..."

Based on this language, the HCJ reasoned that r.119 did apply to the facts at issue in this case. They held that the confiscation and demolition order were within the commander's authority with regards to the first issue raised by the family's petition.

The HCJ then considered the petitioner's second objection, that the commander was at most permitted to destroy only the separate unit of the building where Fuad lived. The HCJ relied on the language of r.119 to resolve that the military commander may destroy any house " . . . the inhabitant or some of the inhabitants of which he is satisfied have committed" a violent offense under the Regulations.

The ruling relied on the HCJ's prior decision in Hizran v. IDF Commander in Gaza Strip The HCJ found no basis in "either the literal text or in the spirit" of the regulation to limit the commander's authority under r.119.

==== Proportionality ====
Although construed broadly, the HCJ maintained that the commander's authority under r.119 is limited by "reasonable discretion and a sense of proportion." Justice Bach proceeded to explain that the HCJ holding "does not mean . . . that this court is not able or bound to intervene in the decision of the military authority, whenever the latter intends to exercise its authority in a way and manner that are unthinkable."

== Critical Scholarship ==
Israel's policy of home demolition in Palestine has spawned a voluminous body of scholarly work. Numerous law review articles have criticized the policy for being immoral, ineffective, contrary to Jewish morals and international law, and some have argued that it may amount to an international crime. Some scholars have argued that the Israeli High Court's jurisprudence in home demolitions cases like Alamarin is not in accordance with public international law.

=== Response to Criticism ===
Israel has argued that collective punishment is an effective deterrent against terrorism. Alan Dershowitz has said that all Palestinians who "passively support" terror attacks are guilty even if they do not provide any direct aid to the attackers. He argues that collective punishment is moral as long it is proportional to complicity.

== See also ==
- Al-Haq
- Collective Punishment
- Geneva Conventions
- HaMoked
- Human rights in Israel
- Israeli Committee Against House Demolitions
- Israel Law Review
- International criminal law
- The Rome Statute of the International Criminal Court
