= High church =

Christian denominations which emphasize ritual and form

High Anglican ordination service

High church refers to Christian beliefs and practices of Christian ecclesiology, liturgy, and theology which emphasize "ritual, priestly authority, [and] sacraments", and a standard liturgy. Although used in connection with various Christian traditions such as high church Lutheranism, the English term high church originated in the Anglican tradition, where it described a churchmanship in the UK in which a number of ritual practices associated in the popular mind with so-called Popery were used, or as a description of such practices in the Catholic Church and elsewhere. The opposite tradition is low church. Contemporary media discussing Anglican churches often prefer the terms evangelical to low church and Anglo-Catholic to high church, even though their meanings do not exactly correspond. Other Christian denominations that contain high church wings include some Presbyterian and Methodist churches. These High-Church Protestants tend to adopt more liturgical and ritually extravagant forms of worship common in Lutheranism and Anglicanism, such as grandiose processions, elaborate music, and historic prayers.

== Variations ==
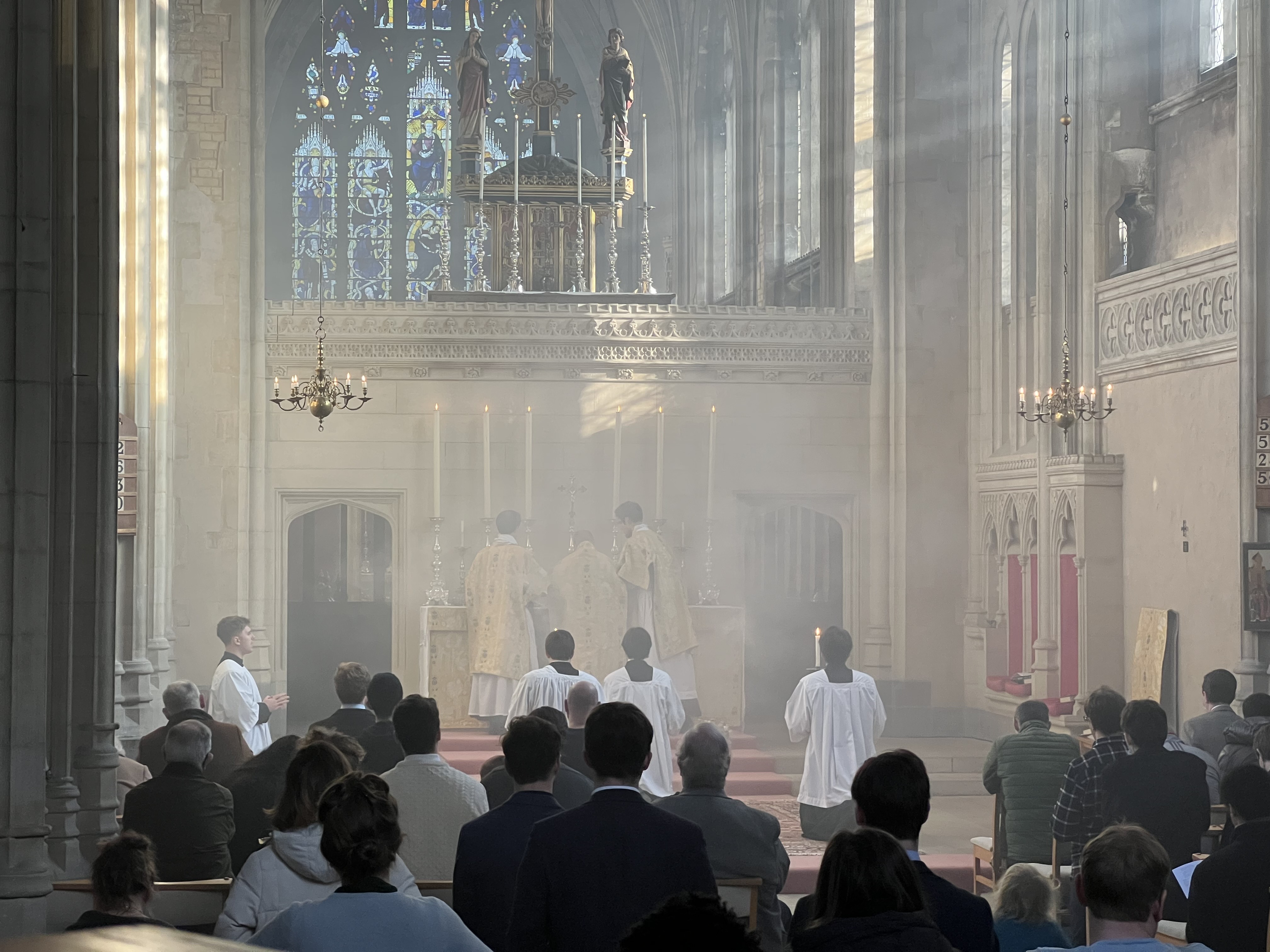
Sunlight cuts through the incense at High Mass at Pusey House, Oxford

Because of its history, the term high church also refers to aspects of Anglicanism quite distinct from the Oxford Movement or Anglo-Catholicism. The Conformists originally referenced the elaborate liturgy and ornate architecture of Lutheranism to advocate for the same in Anglicanism. In 1715, the Anglican prelate Sir William Dawes, 3rd Baronet noted that the "Lutheran religion...[goes] much farther; and are not only more abundant in their Ceremonies, but in the Pomp and Splendor of their Churches where Images and Pictures of Saints and Holy Men are expos'd to publick View on purpose to excite the frequenters of those Sacred Places to the Imitation of their Examples."

There remain parishes that are high church and yet adhere closely to the quintessentially Anglican usages and liturgical practices of the Book of Common Prayer. These are now referred to as Centre Church.

High church Anglicanism tends to be closer than low church to Roman Catholic, Lutheran and Eastern Orthodox teachings and spirituality; its hallmarks are relatively elaborate music, altarpieces, and clergy vestments and an emphasis on sacraments. It is intrinsically traditional. Though Lutheranism in general emphasizes liturgy and views its faith and practice as "deeply and fundamentally catholic", within Lutheranism there is a historic high church and low church distinction comparable with Anglicanism (see Evangelical Catholicism, Neo-Lutheranism and Pietism).

High church nonetheless includes many bishops, other clergy and adherents sympathetic to mainstream modern consensus across reformed Christianity that, according to official Roman Catholic, Confessional Lutheran, and Eastern Orthodox Christian teachings, are anathema (see the ordination of women).

The term high church has also been applied to elements of other Protestant churches within which individual congregations or ministers display a division in their liturgical practices, for example, high church Presbyterianism and high church Methodism. High church Presbyterians and High church Methodists prefer more liturgical and architectural grandiosity, with emphasis on historic traditions and rituals.

== Evolution of the term ==
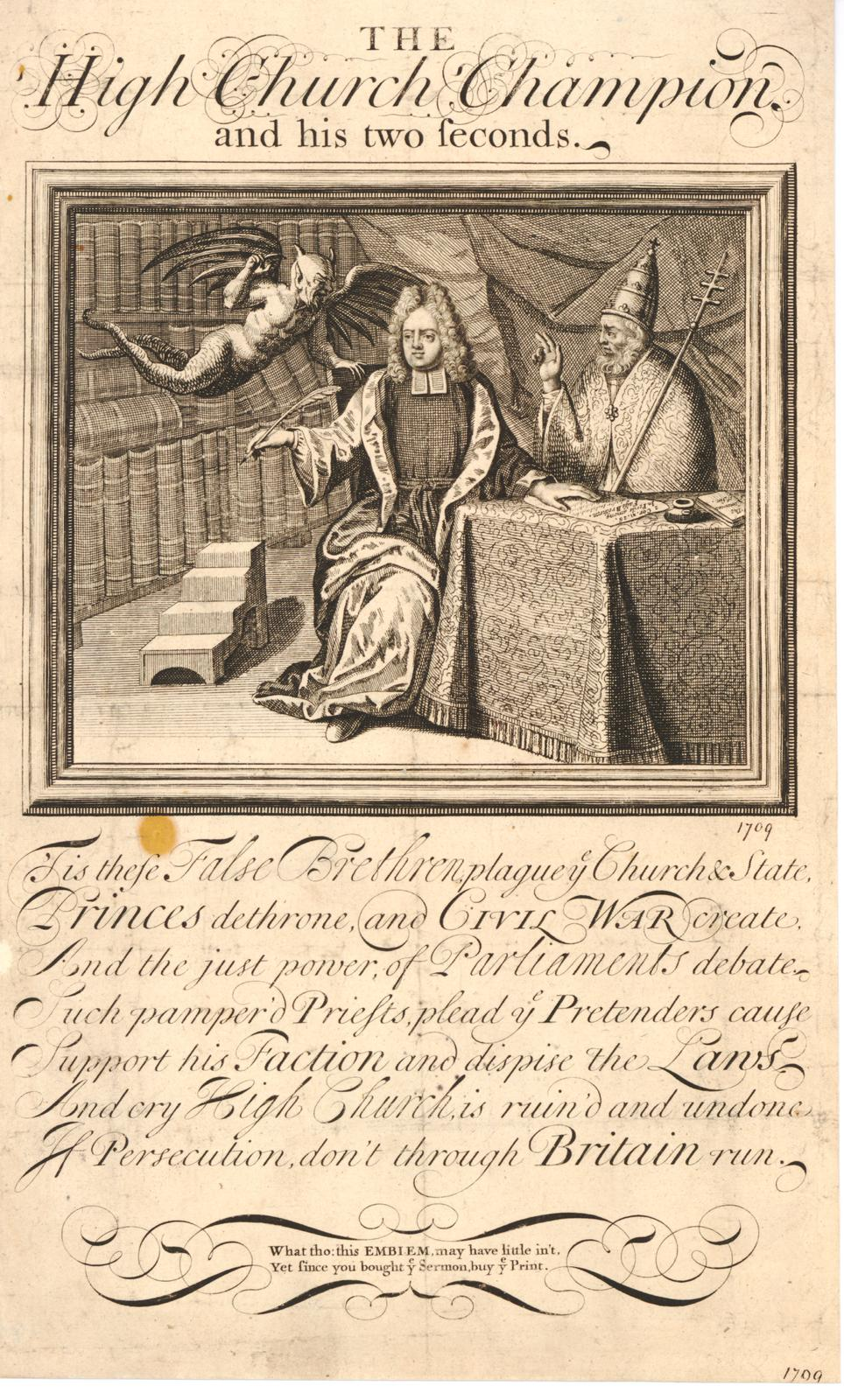
Satirical broadside of 1709/10 accusing Henry Sacheverell, "The High Church Champion", of "Popery"

High church is a back-formation from "high churchman", a label used in the 17th and early 18th centuries to describe opponents of religious toleration, with "high" meaning "extreme". As the Puritans began demanding that the English Church abandon some of its traditional liturgical emphases, episcopal structures, parish ornaments etc., the high church position also came to be distinguished increasingly from that of the Latitudinarians, also known as those promoting a broad church, who sought to minimise the differences between Anglicanism and Reformed Christianity, and to make the church as inclusive as possible by opening its doors as widely as possible to admit other Christian viewpoints.

Though many remained Anglican, over time certain leaders of the Oxford Movement became Roman Catholics, following the path of John Henry Newman, one of the fathers of the Oxford Movement and, for a time, a high churchman himself. A lifelong High Churchman, the Reverend Edward Bouverie Pusey remained the spiritual father of the Oxford Movement who remained a priest in the Church of England. To a lesser extent, looking back from the 19th century, the term high church also came to be associated with the beliefs of the Caroline divines and with the pietistic emphases of the period, practised by the Little Gidding community, such as fasting and lengthy preparations before receiving the Eucharist.

=== Before 1833 ===
During the reign of King James I, there were attempts to diminish the growth of party feeling within the Church of England, and indeed to reconcile to the Church moderate Puritans who did not already conform to the Established Church or who had left the Church in recent years. The project to create the Authorized Version of the Bible was one such attempt at reconciliation. The continued use of the King James version of the Bible, by Anglicans and other Protestants alike in the English-speaking world, is a reflection of the success of this endeavour at cooperation.

During the reign of King Charles I, however, as divisions between Puritan and Anglican elements within the Church of England became more bitter, and Protestant Nonconformity outside the Church grew stronger in numbers and more vociferous, the High Church position became associated with the leadership of the High Church Archbishop of Canterbury, William Laud, (see Laudianism), and government policy to curtail the growth of Protestant Dissent in England and the other possessions of the Crown. See, for example, the attempt to reimpose episcopacy on the Church of Scotland, a policy that was 'successful' until the reign of William and Mary, when the office of bishop was discontinued except among the small minority of Scots who belonged to the Scottish Episcopal Church.

In the wake of the disestablishment of Anglicanism and the persecution of Anglican beliefs and practices under the Commonwealth, the return of the Anglican party to power in the Cavalier Parliament saw a strong revival of the High Church position in the English body politic. Victorious after a generation of struggle, the Anglican gentry felt the need to re-entrench the re-Anglicanised Church of England as one of the most important elements of the Restoration Settlement through a renewed and strengthened alliance between Throne and Altar, or Church and State. Reverence for martyrdom of the Stuart king Charles I as an upholder of his Coronation Oath to protect the Church of England became a hallmark of High Church orthodoxy.

At the same time, the Stuart dynasty was expected to maintain its adherence to Anglicanism. This became an important issue for the High Church party and it was to disturb the Restoration Settlement under Charles II's brother, James II of England, a convert to Roman Catholicism, and lead to setbacks for the High Church party. These events culminated in the Glorious Revolution and the exclusion of the Catholic Stuarts from the British throne. The subsequent split over office-holders' oaths of allegiance to the Crown and the Royal Succession, which led to the exclusion of the Non-Juror bishops who refused to recognise the 1688 de facto abdication of the King, and the accession of King William III and Queen Mary II, and did much to damage the unity of High Church party.

Later events surrounding the attempts of the Jacobites, the adherents of the excluded dynasts, to regain the English and Scottish thrones, led to a sharpening of anti-Catholic rhetoric in Britain and a distancing of the High Church party from the more ritualistic aspects of Caroline High churchmanship, which were often associated with the schismatic Non-Jurors. Thomas Hancorne, a Welsh clergyman prominent in Jacobite circles, gave the County of Swansea's assize sermon on 18 April 1710 (The right way to honour and happiness), during which he complained of the "rapid growth of deist, freethinking and anti-trinitarian views". The targets of Hancorne's wrath were "irreligion, profaneness and immorality", as well as the "curious, inquisitive sceptics" and the "sin-sick tottering nation". Later, he engaged in a campaign to reassert tithe rights. Eventually, under Queen Anne, the High Church party saw its fortunes revive with those of the Tory party, with which it was then strongly associated.

However, under the early Hanoverians, both the High Church and Tory parties were once again out of favour. This led to an increasing marginalisation of High Church and Tory viewpoints, as much of the 18th century was given over to the rule of the Whig party and the aristocratic families who were in large measure pragmatic latitudinarians in churchmanship. This was also the Age of Reason, which marked a period of great spiritual somnolence and stultification in the Church of England.

Thus, by the end of the 18th century and the beginning of the 19th, those liturgical practices prevalent even in High Church circles were not of the same tenor as those later found under the Catholic revival of the 19th century. High Church clergy and laity were often termed high and dry, in reference to their traditional high attitude with regard to political position of the Church in England, and dry faith, which was accompanied by an austere but decorous mode of worship, as reflective of their idea of an orderly and dignified churchmanship against the rantings of the low churchmen that their Cavalier ancestors had defeated. Over time, their High Church position had become ossified among a remnant of bookish churchmen and country squires. An example of an early 19th-century churchman of this tradition is Sir Robert Inglis MP.

=== From 1833 ===
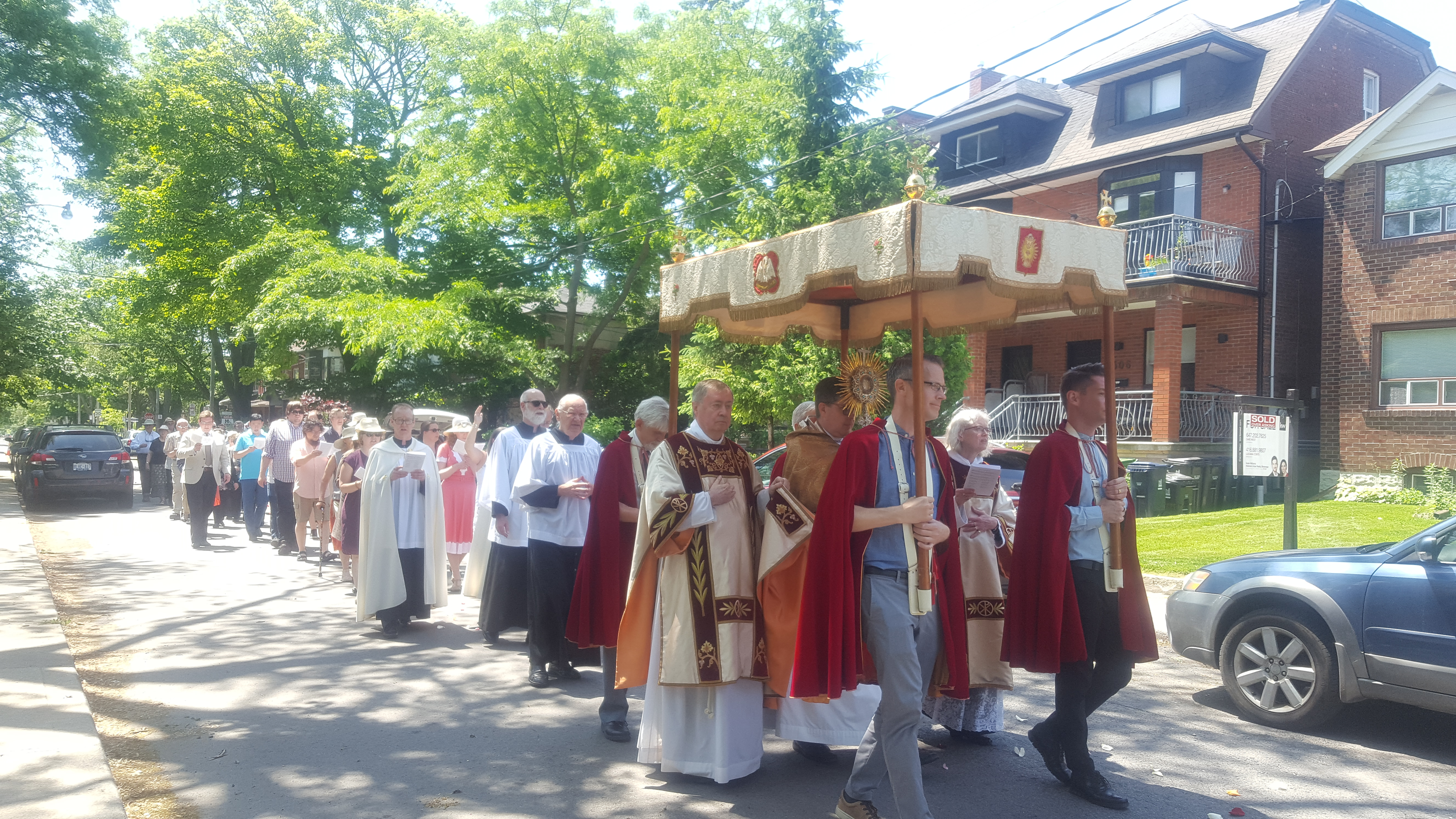
Eucharistic procession by the Church of St. Mary Magdalene (Toronto)

Only with the success of the Oxford Movement and its increasing emphases on ritualistic revival from the mid-19th century onward, did the term High Church begin to mean something approaching the later term Anglo-Catholic. Even then, it was only employed coterminously in contrast to the Low churchmanship of the Evangelical position. This sought, once again, to lessen the separation of Anglicans (the Established Church) from the majority of Protestant Nonconformists, who by this time included the Methodists as well as adherents of older Protestant denominations like Baptists, Congregationalists, and Presbyterians known by the group term Old Dissent.

In contrast to the Old High Church's alliance with the Tories, Anglo-Catholicism became increasingly associated with socialism, the Labour Party and greater decision-making liberty for the church's convocations.From the mid-19th century onward, the term High Church generally became associated with a more Anglo-Catholic, while the Latitudinarians were referred to as being Broad Church and the re-emergent evangelical party was dubbed Low Church. However, high church can still refer to Anglicans of the pre-Oxford movement High Church, who hold a high view of the sacraments, church tradition and the threefold ministry but do not consider themselves Anglo-Catholics. This party is now called Centre Church, or the Old High Church to differentiate it from the even higher Anglo-Catholic position.

== Anglican Communion ==
=== Notable institutions ===
- Keble College, Oxford
- Nashotah House
- Pusey House, Oxford
- St Stephen's House, Oxford
- Westcott House, Cambridge

== See also ==
- Anglican devotions
- Catholicism
    - High Mass
- Christian monasticism
- Church of South India
- Churchmanship
  - Church of England
    - Anglo-Catholicism
    - Central churchmanship
    - Broad church
    - Low church
  - Continuing Anglican Movement
    - Anglican Catholic Church
    - Anglican Catholic Church of Canada
    - Anglican Church in America
    - Anglican Province of America
    - United Episcopal Church of North America
- Lutheranism
  - Evangelical Catholic
  - High Church Lutheranism
  - Neo-Lutheranism
- Presbyterianism
  - Scottish Church Society

== Bibliography ==
- Addleshaw, G. W. O. (1941) The High Church Tradition: a study in the liturgical thought of the seventeenth century. London: Faber
- Cross, F. L. (ed.) (1957) The Oxford Dictionary of the Christian Church. London: Oxford U. P.; High Churchmen, p. 636
- Hein, David (1991) "The High Church Origins of the American Boarding School" in: Journal of Ecclesiastical History 42 (1991): 577–95.
- Hylson-Smith, Kenneth (1993) High Churchmanship in the Church of England, from the sixteenth century to the late twentieth century. Edinburgh: T & T Clark
