= Zerah =

Biblical character

Zerah or Zerach (pronounced [ˈze.raχ]; Biblical Hebrew: זֶרַח, romanized: zéraḥ, lit. 'rising'), also spelled as Zarah or Zarach (זָרַח, zāraḥ, 'he rose'), refers to several people in the Hebrew Bible.

== An Edomite ==
Zerah was the name of an Edomite chief. He was listed as the second son of Reuel, son of Basemath, who was Ishmael's daughter and one of the wives of Esau, the brother of Jacob.

== Son of Tamar and Judah ==
According to Genesis 38:30, Zerah was the son of Tamar and her father-in-law Judah, and the twin of Perez. This same Zerah is mentioned in the genealogy of Jesus in Matthew 1:3 of the Christian Bible. Zerah is also listed as the ancestor of Achan, who was stoned to death as recounted in Joshua 7:1. The genealogy can be recounted as: Achan is the son of Carmi, the son of Zabdi, the son of Zerah, the son of Zimri, the son of Zerah.

=== Family trees ===
Judah	Daughter of Shuah
Er	Tamar	Onan	Shelah
Perez & Zerah (twins)

Zerah
Zabdi or Zimri	Ethan	Heman	Calcol	Dara or Darda
Carmi	Azariah
Achan or Achar

== Simeonite clan ==
The Bible also identifies Zerah as the name of the founder of one of the Simeonite clans.

== The Cushite ==
Zerah the Cushite is mentioned by the Book of Chronicles (2 Chronicles 14:9–15). There he is said to have invaded the Kingdom of Judah with an enormous army in the days of Asa. According to the text, when Zerah's army reached that of Asa at the valley of Zephathah near Mareshah, Zerah's army was utterly defeated, by divine intervention, and Asa's forces collected a large volume of spoils of war.

The invasion, and its implied time-frame, means that the traditional view was to consider this Zerah to have actually been Usarkon II or Usarkon I, both being rulers of Egypt. Usarkon II is known to have entered the Kingdom of Judah with a huge army in 853 BCE; however, rather than attacking Judah, the army was just passing through on its way to attack the Assyrian forces. In addition, Asa's reign is traditionally dated to have ended in 873 BCE. In the Book of Kings, which doesn't mention Asa's defeat of Zerah, Asa is described as being extremely weak from a defensive point of view (1 Kings 15:16–22), and Biblical scholars regard the idea that Asa could defeat an enormous Egyptian army to be untenable. More recent scholars consider that Zerah the Cushite may have been a military commander under Osorkon I rather than a Pharaoh.

Furthermore, Cushite refers to Kush. It is unclear why either Usarkon should be described as a Cushite. The name “Zerah” may have been a corruption of “Usarkon” (U-Serak-on), to which it closely resembles (see Petrie, Egypt and Israel, 74), but most scholars do not identify Zerah with Usarkon II. The publication by Naville (1891) of an inscription in which Usarkon II would claim to have invaded Lower and Upper Palestine suggests this Pharaoh as the victor over Asa. However, the Bible contends that Asa won the battle.

It is a possibility that Cushites gained dominance in Upper and Lower Egypt during the 9th and 8th century. Zerah was most likely a Cushite of Nubia located in Southern Egypt and Northern Sudan who came to power as ruler of Egypt or at the very least a Nubian commander of The Egyptian/Nubian armies. William F. Albright suggested that Zerah was the governor of a Cushite colony which had been established by Shishak after his campaign in Israel. Isaiah 18:2 tells us that the Cushites (Ethiopians) were feared far and wide for conquests and destruction (being a powerful nation who dominated ancient kingdoms). Cushites were a very formidable people who were expert archers famous in the ancient world for surprise attacks with the bow and arrow.

== In the genealogies of the Book of Chronicles ==
The Book of Chronicles mentions a Zerah who was a Gershonite Levite (1 Chr. 6:6; 6:26).
