= Achor =

Valley near Jericho

Coordinates: 31.83686°N 35.399773°E

Achor /ˈeɪkər/ (Hebrew: עכור "muddy, turbid: gloomy, dejected") is the name of a valley in the vicinity of Jericho.

== History ==
The Book of Joshua, chapter seven, relates the story from which the valley's name comes. After the problems the Israelites had as a result of Achan's immoral theft of items commanded to be destroyed, the Israelite community stoned Achan and his household. The narrative about Achan is etiological, presenting a folk etymology.

Due to the nature of this narrative, the phrase valley of trouble became eminently proverbial and occurs elsewhere in the Hebrew Bible. The Book of Isaiah and Book of Hosea use the term – the valley of trouble, a place for herds to lie down in, the valley of trouble for a door of hope, as a way of describing the redemption promised by God.

== Identification ==
Eusebius (in Onomasticon) and Jerome (in Book of Sites and Names of Hebrew Places) implied that they thought it was a valley north of Jericho. In the nineteenth century some writers identified the valley with the wadi al-Qelt, a deep ravine located to Jericho's south. In the twentieth century the Hyrcania valley (El-Buqei'a in Arabic) west and south of Qumran, and Wadi en-Nu'eima have also been suggested. One difficulty is that the narrative of Joshua appears to place the valley of Achor to the north of Jericho, between Jericho and Ai; but Joshua makes the valley part of the boundary between the tribe of Judah and the tribe of Benjamin, to the south of Jericho, but not as far south as El-Buqei'a.
