= Joshua 7 =

Book of Joshua, chapter 7

- ← chapter 6 chapter 8 →
- The pages containing the Book of Joshua in Leningrad Codex (1008 CE).
- Book: Book of Joshua
- Hebrew Bible part: Nevi'im
- Order in the Hebrew part: 1
- Category: Former Prophets
- Christian Bible part: Old Testament
- Order in the Christian part: 6

Joshua 7 is the seventh chapter of the Book of Joshua in the Hebrew Bible or in the Old Testament of the Christian Bible. According to Jewish tradition the book was attributed to Joshua, with additions by the high priests Eleazar and Phinehas, but modern scholars view it as part of the Deuteronomistic History, which spans the books of Deuteronomy to 2 Kings, attributed to nationalistic and devotedly Yahwistic writers during the time of the reformer Judean king Josiah in 7th century BCE. This chapter focuses on the first battle against Ai under the leadership of Joshua and Achan's sin, a part of a section comprising Joshua 5:13–12:24 about the conquest of Canaan.

== Text ==
This chapter was originally written in the Hebrew language. It is divided into 26 verses.

=== Textual witnesses ===
Some early manuscripts containing the text of this chapter in Hebrew are of the Masoretic Text tradition, which includes the Codex Cairensis (895), Aleppo Codex (10th century), and Codex Leningradensis (1008). Fragments containing parts of this chapter in Hebrew were found among the Dead Sea Scrolls including 4Q47 (4QJosh^{a}; 200–100 BCE) with extant verses 12–17.

Extant ancient manuscripts of a translation into Koine Greek known as the Septuagint (originally was made in the last few centuries BCE) include Codex Vaticanus (B; $\mathfrak{G}$^{B}; 4th century) and Codex Alexandrinus (A; $\mathfrak{G}$^{A}; 5th century). (Note: The whole book of Joshua is missing from the extant Codex Sinaiticus.) Fragments of the Septuagint Greek text containing this chapter is found in manuscripts such as Washington Manuscript I (5th century CE), and a reduced version of the Septuagint text is found in the illustrated Joshua Roll.

== Analysis ==
The narrative of Israelites conquering the land of Canaan comprises verses 5:13 to 12:24 of the Book of Joshua and has the following outline:

A. Jericho (5:13–6:27)
B. Achan and Ai (7:1–8:29)

1. The Sin of Achan (7:1-26)

a. Narrative Introduction (7:1)
b. Defeat at Ai (7:2-5)
c. Joshua's Prayer (7:6-9)
d. Process for Identifying the Guilty (7:10-15)
e. The Capture of Achan (7:16-21)
f. Execution of Achan and His Family (7:22-26)

2. The Capture of Ai (8:1-29)

a. Narrative Introduction (8:1-2)
b. God's Plan for Capturing the City (8:3-9)
c. Implementation of God's Plan (8:10-13)
d. The Successful Ambush (8:14-23)
e. Destruction of Ai (8:24-29)

C. Renewal at Mount Ebal (8:30–35)
D. The Gibeonite Deception (9:1–27)
E. The Campaign in the South (10:1–43)
F. The Campaign in the North and Summary List of Kings (11:1–12:24)

The narrative of Joshua 7–8 combines the story of Achan's offence against the 'devoted things', and the battle report concerning Ai, as the two themes are linked.

Chapter 7 has the following chiastic structure:

A. YHWH's wrath: burning (7:1)

B. Disaster for Israel: defeat (7:2–5)

C. Israel's leaders before YHWH: perplexity (7:6–9)

D. Divine revelation of the problem (7:10–12a)

E. Midpoint (7:12b)

D'. Divine revelation of the solution (7:13–15)

C'. Israel before YHWH: clarity and exposure (7:16–23)

B'. Disaster for Achan: execution (7:24–26a)

A'. YHWH's wrath: turned away (7:26b)

== Defeat at Ai (7:1–15) ==
After the triumphant conquest of Jericho, it emerges that the herem ("ban") on Jericho was not completely executed by the Israelites (7:1), indicated by the word 'break faith' to mean 'rebellion against God' that brings severe punishment (cf. 1 Chronicles 10:13–14) and the whole nation is affected by the sin of one person (Achan). Meanwhile, Joshua turns his attention to Ai (literally 'the heap') a city east of Bethel in the central mountain ridge, to get an important foothold in the heartland. Joshua first sends spies (7:2–3), recalling both the first mission that he had authorized (2:1), and the earlier one sent by Moses (Numbers 13–14; Deuteronomy 1). Whereas the account of fearful spies to Moses (Deuteronomy 1:28) gave way to a false confidence which resulted in ignominious defeat (Deuteronomy 1:41–45), this time the message from the spies gave a false confidence (unknowing of Achan's sin) resulting in similar defeat, and in both cases the people's hearts 'melt' (Deuteronomy 1:28; Joshua 7:5) at the apparent invincibility of the enemy, because YHWH withdraws his presence from them (Deuteronomy 1:42; Joshua 7:12). Ironically, the fear felt by the Israelites here also directly reverses the fear (also the 'melting hearts') felt by the Amorites before their own advance (5:1).

Joshua assumes the Mosaic role of intercessor (verses 6–9) when he prays together with the 'elders of Israel', while Israel, as a whole, cries to YHWH during this crisis. YHWH's reply to Joshua (7:10–15) is the theological centre of the passage, revealing the problem, known to the reader since verses 1–2, but not yet to Joshua, that Israel was unfaithful in respect of the "ban", so now has become subject to the "ban" itself, as the sin against the "ban" is a 'breach of the covenant' (verse 11). God now prescribes the harsh penalty for infringement of the "ban" (verses 13–15).

=== Verse 1 ===
But the children of Israel committed a trespass in the accursed thing: for Achan, the son of Carmi, the son of Zabdi, the son of Zerah, of the tribe of Judah, took of the accursed thing: and the anger of the LORD was kindled against the children of Israel.

- "Accursed thing" from Hebrew: חֵ֔רֶם, ḥê-rem, also rendered as "devoted" thing, thing "under the ban" (NABRE), "what was set apart [to the Lord]".
- "Achan": spelled as "Achar" (meaning "disaster") in 1 Chronicles 2:7 (and in Greek Septuagint for both verses), thus declaring him "bringer of disaster of Israel" (a phrase used by Ahab to Elijah in 1 Kings 18:17)., although both verses use the same language to recount the "unfaithfulness" or "trespass" regarding the "accursed thing" (ma-‘al ba-ḥê-rem,).

=== Verse 6 ===
Then Joshua tore his clothes and fell to the earth on his face before the ark of the LORD until the evening, he and the elders of Israel. And they put dust on their heads.

Joshua's prostration and the elders dust-strewn heads as signs of mourning are also evident in other biblical text (Genesis 37:54; 44:13; 1 Samuel 4:12; 2 Samuel 1:2; Job 1:20; 2:12; Lamentations 2:10; Ezekiel 27:30) as well as in extrabiblical texts, such as in Ugaritic Baal epic that even the gods mourn in similar ways.((descends) from the footstool, sits on the earth. He pours dirt of mourning on his head).

== Sin of Achan (7:16–26) ==
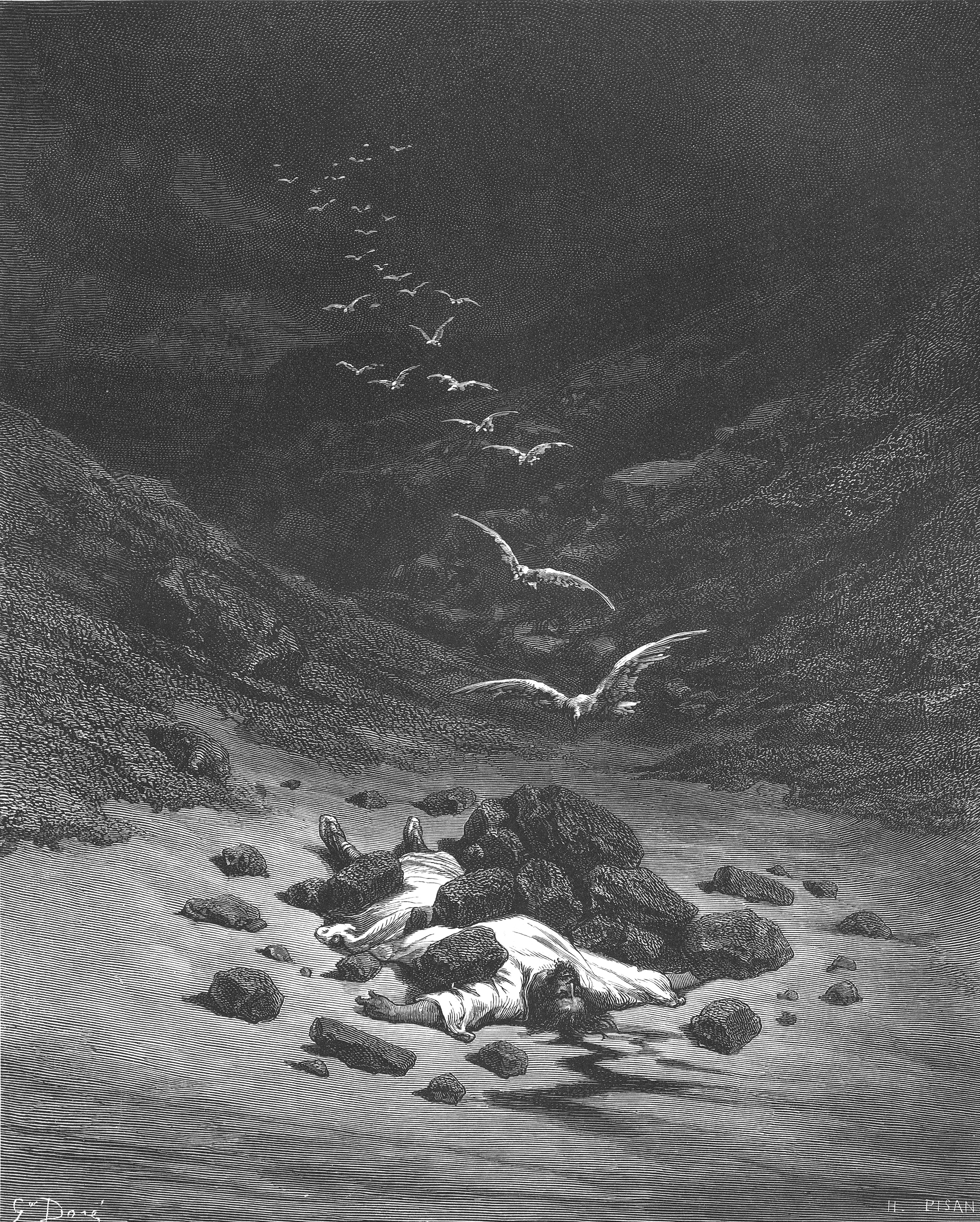
The Stoning of Achan by Gustav Doré.

The sin of Achan consists not only in having stolen the goods, a kind of robbery of God, but also in having illegitimately transferred them from the holy realm to the profane one, the penalty for the infringement of holiness conventions or regulations was death (cf. Numbers 16). The culprit must be found because otherwise all Israel must bear the guilt. The method of discovering the guilty party is by sacred lot (cf. 1 Samuel 10:20–21). The remaining narrative (7:16–26) records the execution of the divine command including to collectively stone Achan and his family to death. The call to 'probity before God', and the 'solemnity of commitment', is also found in the New Testament (Acts 5:1–11).

=== Verse 26 ===
Then they raised over him a great heap of stones, still there to this day. So the Lord turned from the fierceness of His anger. Therefore the name of that place has been called the Valley of Achor to this day.

- "Achor": meaning "trouble", is explained by association with 'Achan' (which is spelled as 'Achar'

In 1 Chronicles 2:7, and in some Greek manuscripts of Septuagint; cf. Joshua 7:1, where the letters 'r' and 'n' being easily confused in Hebrew.). The "valley of Achor" is later mentioned in Joshua 15:7 among the places forming the northern border of Judah, not repeated for Benjamin, so Achan and his family was buried within the territory of his tribe (Judah).The name "valley of Achor" as "valley of disaster" is used for messianic promises in other books of the prophets, where it would be changed into "a resting place" for God's people (Isaiah 65:10) and "a door of hope" (Hosea 2:15).

== Archaeology ==
Archaeological works in the 1930s at the location of Et-Tell or Khirbet Haijah showed that the city of Ai, an early target for conquest in the putative Joshua account, had existed and been destroyed, but in the 22nd century BC. Some alternate sites for Ai, such as Khirbet el-Maqatir or Khirbet Nisya, have been proposed which would partially resolve the discrepancy in dates, but these sites have not been widely accepted.

== See also ==
- Ark of the Covenant
- Amorites
- Babylon
- Beth-aven
- Bethel
- Canaanite
- Cattle
- Children of Israel
- Confession
- Covenant
- Covetousness
- Curse
- Domestic sheep
- Donkey
- Gold
- Harlot
- Jericho
- Jordan River
- Sanctification
- Shebarim
- Shekel
- Silver
- Sin
- Stoning
- Theft
- Related Bible parts: Numbers 16, Joshua 6, Joshua 8, Acts 5

== Sources ==
- Beal, Lissa M. Wray (2019). Longman, Tremper III; McKnight, Scot (eds.). Joshua. The Story of God Bible Commentary. Zondervan Academic. ISBN 978-0310490838.
- Coogan, Michael David (2007). Coogan, Michael David; Brettler, Marc Zvi; Newsom, Carol Ann; Perkins, Pheme (eds.). The New Oxford Annotated Bible with the Apocryphal/Deuterocanonical Books: New Revised Standard Version, Issue 48 (Augmented 3rd ed.). Oxford University Press. ISBN 978-0195288810.
- Firth, David G. (2021). Joshua: Evangelical Biblical Theology Commentary. Evangelical Biblical Theology Commentary (EBTC) (illustrated ed.). Lexham Press. ISBN 9781683594406.
- Fitzmyer, Joseph A. (2008). A Guide to the Dead Sea Scrolls and Related Literature. Grand Rapids, MI: William B. Eerdmans Publishing Company. ISBN 9780802862419.
- Halley, Henry H. (1965). Halley's Bible Handbook: an abbreviated Bible commentary (24th (revised) ed.). Zondervan Publishing House. ISBN 0-310-25720-4.
- Harstad, Adolph L. (2004). Joshua. Concordia Publishing House. ISBN 978-0570063193.
- Hayes, Christine (2015). Introduction to the Bible. Yale University Press. ISBN 978-0300188271.
- McConville, Gordon (2007). "9. Joshua". In Barton, John; Muddiman, John (eds.). The Oxford Bible Commentary (first (paperback) ed.). Oxford University Press. pp. 158–176. ISBN 978-0199277186.
- Rösel, Hartmut N. (2011). Joshua. Historical commentary on the Old Testament. Vol. 6 (illustrated ed.). Peeters. ISBN 978-9042925922.
- Ulrich, Eugene, ed. (2010). The Biblical Qumran Scrolls: Transcriptions and Textual Variants. Brill.
- Würthwein, Ernst (1995). The Text of the Old Testament. Translated by Rhodes, Erroll F. Grand Rapids, MI: Wm. B. Eerdmans. ISBN 0-8028-0788-7.
