= Achan (biblical figure) =

Biblical character (Joshua 7); executed by stoning

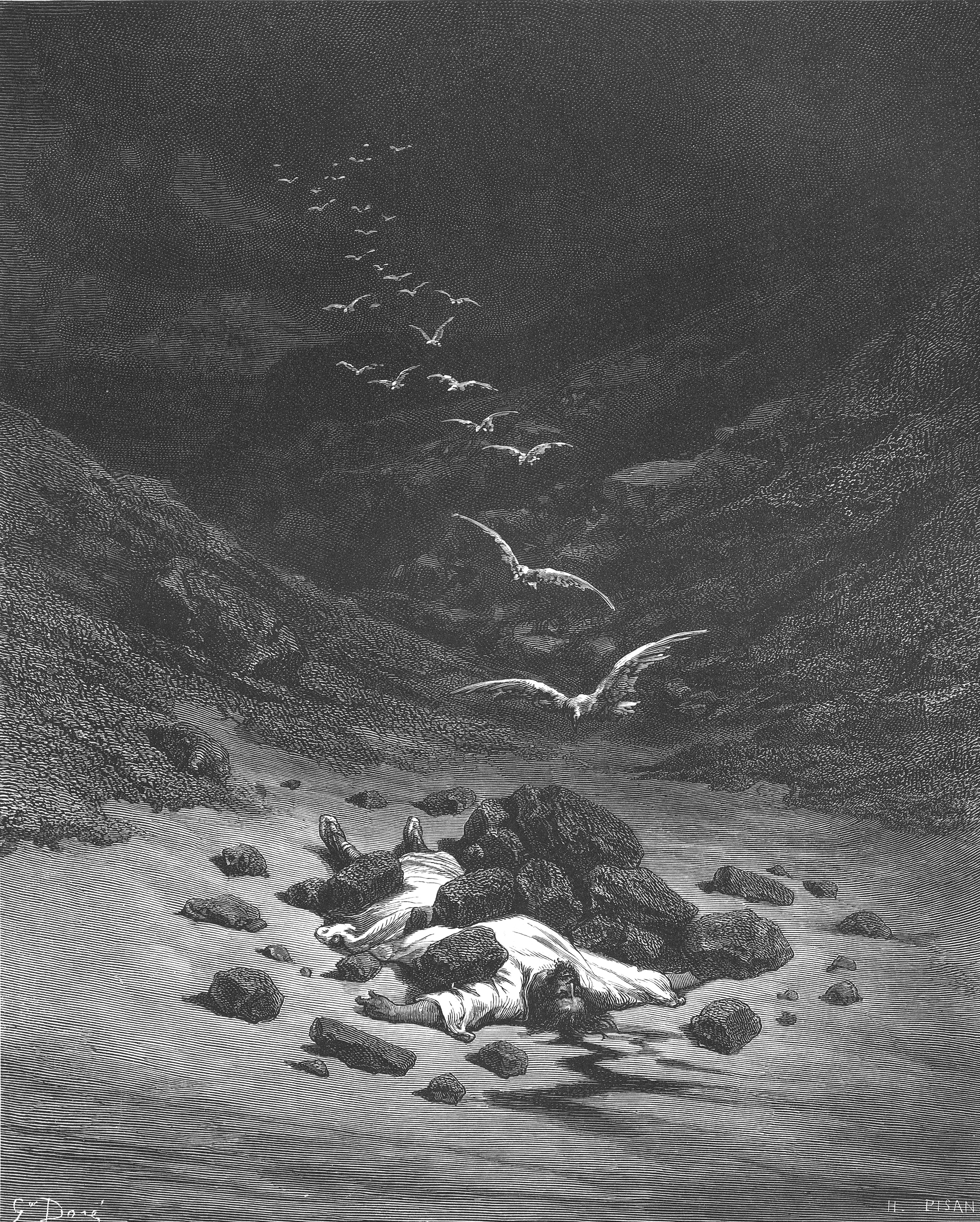
The Stoning of Achan by Gustav Doré.

Achan (/ˈeɪkæn/; Hebrew: עָכָן, romanized: ‘Āḵān), the son of Carmi, a descendant of Zimri, the son of Zerah, of the tribe of Judah, is a figure who appears in the Book of Joshua in the Hebrew Bible in connection with the fall of Jericho and conquest of Ai. By combining the narrative of the books of Joshua and 1 Chronicles, we can reconstruct his genealogy as: Achan, the son of Carmi, the son of Zabdi, the son of Zerah, the son of (Zimri), the son of Zerah, the son of Judah.

His name is given as Achar (עָכָר֙ ‘Āḵār) in 1 Chronicles 2:7. This is most likely a pejorative, as Achar means "troubler."

== Account in the Book of Joshua ==
According to the narrative of Joshua chapter 7, Achan pillaged an ingot of gold, a quantity of silver, and a "beautiful Babylonian garment" from Jericho, in contravention of Joshua's directive that "all the silver, and gold, and vessels of brass and iron, are consecrated unto the Lord: they shall come into the treasury of the Lord" (Joshua 6:19).

The Book of Joshua claims that this act resulted in the Israelites being collectively punished by God, in that they failed in their first attempt to capture Ai, with about 36 Israelites lost (Joshua 7:5). The Israelites used cleromancy (the sacred Lots Urim and Thummim) to decide who was to blame, and having identified Achan, they stoned him to death. The consecrated goods were burnt by the Israelites, according to the text, and stones piled on top. Yahweh's anger against Israel later subsided.

“‘In the morning, present yourselves tribe by tribe. The tribe the Lord chooses shall come forward clan by clan; the clan the Lord chooses shall come forward family by family; and the family the Lord chooses shall come forward man by man. Whoever is caught with the devoted things shall be destroyed by fire, along with all that belongs to him. He has violated the covenant of the Lord and has done an outrageous thing in Israel!’”

— Joshua 7:14–15

Then all Israel stoned him, and after they had stoned the rest, they burned them. Over Achan they heaped up a large pile of rocks, which remains to this day. Then the Lord turned from his fierce anger. Therefore that place has been called the Valley of Achor ever since

— Joshua 7:26

== Interpretation ==
The narrative states that the location for this punishment of Achan, which lies between Jericho and Ai, became known as the vale of Achor in memory of him. This narrative is probably an etiological myth providing a folk etymology for Achor, at the point in the narrative where the vale of Achor is necessarily crossed.

One item to note however is that the text describes the garment that Achor stole as Babylonish; (from Shinar) the time of the Israelite invasion is usually dated to the 15th or 12th century BC, but between 1595 BCE and 627 BCE Babylon was under foreign rule. For this reason, a few textual scholars believe that this part of the Achor narrative was written during the 7th century BC or later, but many Biblical scholars believe the judge Samuel may have put together this account from historical books from that time.

It is not certain, however, that the whole Achor narrative dates from this time, as textual critics believe that the Achor narrative may have been spliced together from two earlier source texts; the words in the first part of Joshua 7:25, "all Israel stoned him with stones" (וירגמו אתו) show a different style and tradition from those at the end of the verse: "and they burned them in fire, and they stoned them with stones" (וישרפו אתם באש ויסקלו אתם באבנים). The repetition, the switching from "him" to "them", and switching of the Hebrew verb for "to stone", indicate that this story may be an amalgam from two different sources.

=== Rabbinic ===
The Jewish exegetes, Rashi, Gersonides, and others, maintain that the stoning (Josh. vii. 25) was inflicted only on the beasts, and that the sons and daughters were brought there merely to witness and be warned. This seems to be the opinion also of the rabbis in the Talmud (see Rashi on Sanh. 44a), although they say that the wife and the children were accessories to the crime, in so far as they knew of it and kept silent. According to another and apparently much older rabbinical tradition, Achan's crime had many aggravating features. He had seen in Jericho an idol endowed with magic powers, with a tongue of gold, the costly mantle spread upon it, the silver presents before it. By taking this idol he caused the death, before the city of Ai, of thirty-six righteous men of Israel, members of the high court. When Joshua, through the twelve precious stones of the high priest's breastplate, learned who was the culprit, he resorted to the severest measures of punishment, inflicting death by stoning and by fire both on him and his children, in spite of Deut. xxiv. 16; for these had known of the crime and had not at once told the chiefs of the hidden idol. They thus brought death upon more than half the members of the high court (see Pirḳe R. El. xxxviii.; Tan., Wa-yesheb, ed. 1863, p. 43). Another view expressed by the rabbis is that Achan committed incest, or violated the Sabbath, or was otherwise guilty of a five-fold crime. This view is based upon the fivefold use of the word ("also," "even") in Josh. vii. 11 ("They have also transgressed my covenant," etc.), as well as upon his own confession: "Thus and thus have I done" (Josh. vii. 20). Achan is held up by the rabbis as a model of the penitent sinner; because his public confession and subsequent punishment saved him from eternal doom in Gehenna. "Every culprit before he is to meet his penalty of death," says the Mishnah Sanh. vi. 2, "is told to make a public confession, in order to be saved from Gehenna's doom." Thus Achan confessed to all his sins when he said: "Of a truth I have sinned against the Lord, the God of Israel, and thus and thus I have done." That his avowal saved him from eternal doom may be learned from Joshua's words to Achan: "Why hast thou troubled us? So may the Lord trouble you this day," which are taken to mean "in the life that now is, so that thou mayest be released in the life to come" (Sanh. 43b-44; see also Ḳimḥi on Josh. v. 25).'

== Family tree ==
Zerah
Zabdi or Zimri	Ethan	Heman	Calcol	Dara or Darda
Carmi	Azariah
Achan or Achar
