= Caroline Divines =

Influential 17th-century Anglican theologians and writers

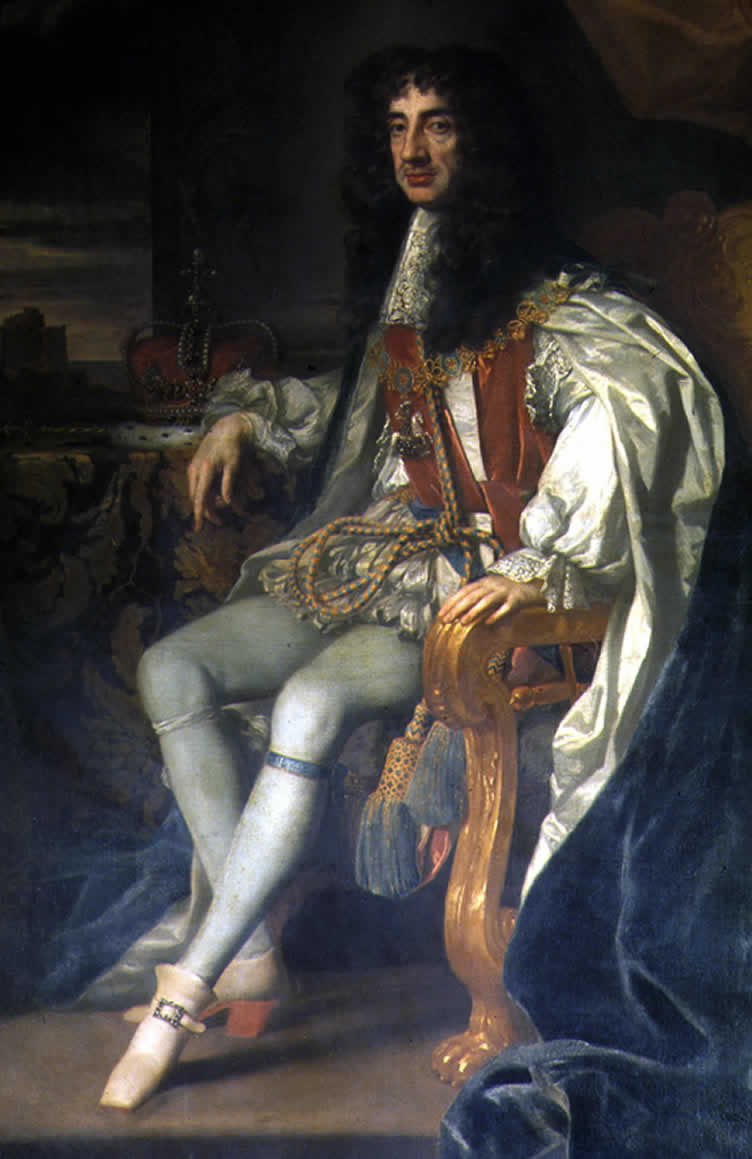
Charles II was restored as King of England in 1660.

The Caroline Divines were influential theologians and writers in the Church of England who lived during the reigns of King Charles I and, after the Stuart Restoration, King Charles II (Latin: Carolus). There is no official list of Caroline-era divines; they are defined by the era in which they lived, and Caroline Divines hailed from England, Ireland, Scotland, and Wales. However, of these four nations, it is Caroline England which is most commonly considered to have fostered a golden age of Anglican scholarship and devotional writing, despite the socio-cultural upset of civil war, regicide, and military rule under Oliver Cromwell. Importantly, the term divine is restricted neither to canonised saints nor to Anglican figures, but is used of many writers and thinkers in the wider Christian church.

== Theology and outlook ==
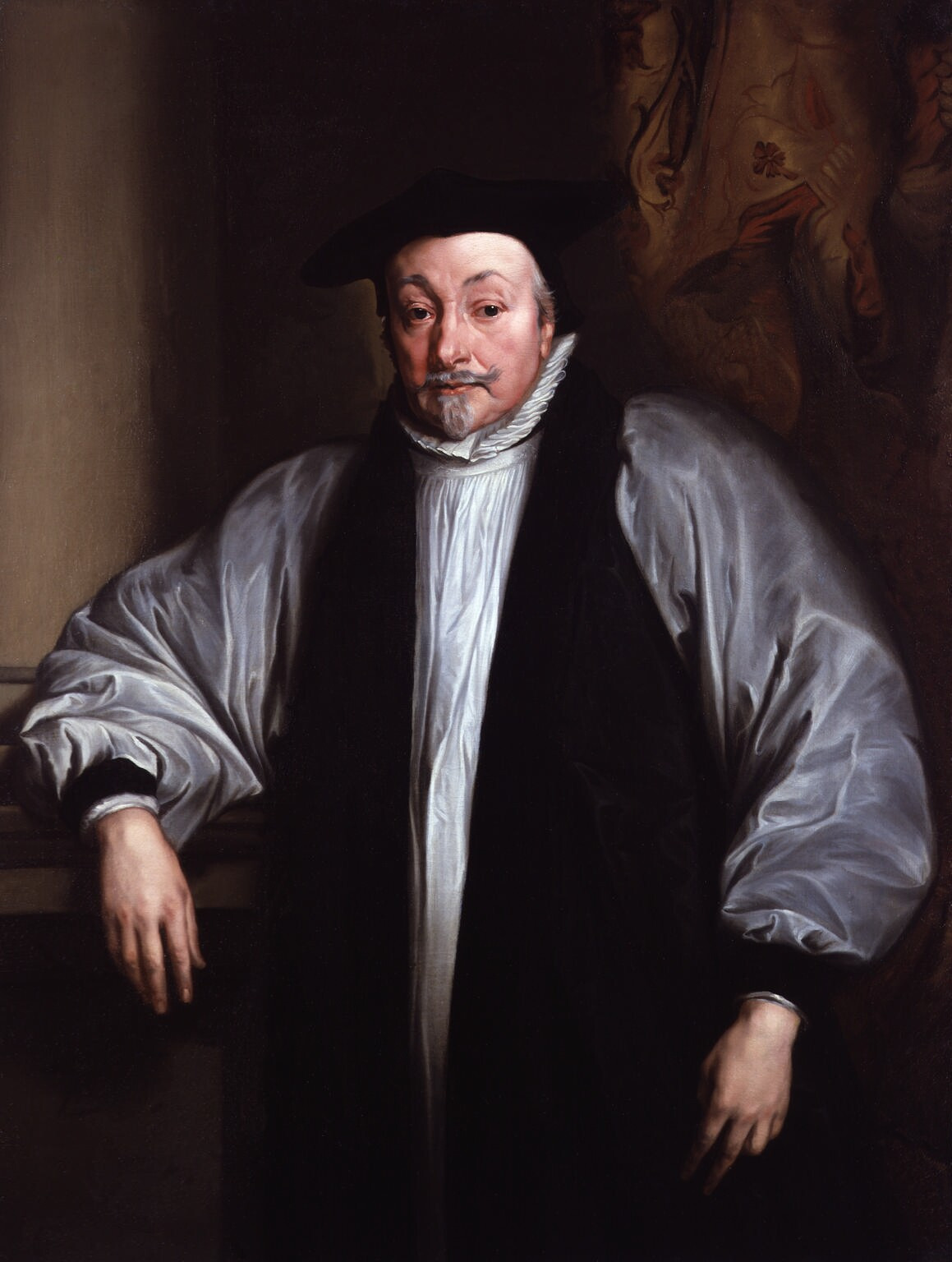
William Laud

The corpus produced by the Caroline divines is diverse. What they have in common is a commitment to the faith as conveyed by Scripture and the Book of Common Prayer, thus regarding prayer and theology in a manner akin to that of the Apostolic Fathers and other later Christian writers. On the whole, the Caroline Divines view the via media of Anglicanism not as a compromise but "a positive position, witnessing to the universality of God and God's kingdom working through the fallible, earthly ecclesia Anglicana." These theologians regarded Scripture as authoritative in matters concerning salvation, although they drew upon tradition and reason as well, the latter in the form of deductive logic and the former with special reference to the Church Fathers. Politically, the Caroline Divines were royalists but primarily of a constitutional, rather than absolutist bent.

Their promotion of more elaborate ceremonial and their valuation of visual beauty in art and church architecture was variously labelled as "popish", "Romish", "Lutheran", or "Arminian" by their Puritan opponents. Such embellishments, however, were not only integral to their spirituality, but were seen by the Carolines as combatting the appeal of Roman Catholicism. And, contrary to Puritan accusation, the emphasis upon beauty had nothing to do with "Arminian" influence. Rather than face a choice between an austere Puritanism or an elaborate Roman ceremonial, the Caroline divines presented their countrymen with a via media in which they could remain within the established church and also participate in ancient forms of religion.

== Prominent exponents ==
Within the Anglican tradition, there have been certain theological writers whose works have been considered standards for faith, doctrine, worship, and spirituality. These are often commemorated in lesser feasts of the Church, and their works are frequently anthologised. Among the Caroline divines of the seventeenth century, the following are prominent.

=== King Charles the Martyr ===
King Charles I (19 November 1600 – 30 January 1649) encouraged liturgical renewal and the publication of devotional writings during his reign. The most popular devotional work in seventeenth-century England was the king's own autobiographical Eikon Basilike (Ancient Greek: Εἰκὼν Βασιλική, romanized: Eikṑn Basilikḗ, lit. 'Royal Portrait'), which was translated into numerous European languages. He defended popular recreational activities through his re-publication of the Book of Sports in 1633, which was originally promulgated by his father, King James VI, in 1617. Charles I also stood against the advance of extreme predestinarian theology in the Church of England, principally through his Declaration on the Articles of Religion (1628). When the Book of Common Prayer was revised in 1662, this declaration was permanently affixed as the preface to the Articles of Religion. Like both his predecessors and successors, Charles I was said to have the Royal touch, which he practised during his lifetime, and miracle stories were attributed to the king's relics after his death. Charles I was canonised by the Church of England as King Charles the Martyr, the first Anglican saint, and placed as such in the 1662 Calendar of Saints. However, 30 January, the date of his martyrdom, was not denoted as a feast, but as a fast intended for annual reflection and repentance.

=== Lancelot Andrewes ===
Lancelot Andrewes (1555 – 25 September 1626) was an English priest and scholar, who held high positions in the Church of England during the reigns of Queen Elizabeth I and King James I. He was the spiritual father of Charles I. During the reign of James I, Andrewes served as Bishop of Chichester and oversaw the translation of the Authorized Version (or King James Version) of the Bible. In the Church of England he is commemorated on 25 September with a Lesser Festival. His most popular work has proven to be his Preces Privatae (Private Prayers), which was published posthumously and has remained in print since renewed interest in Andrewes developed in the 19th century. His Ninety-Six Sermons have been occasionally reprinted and are considered among the most rhetorically developed and polished sermons of the late-sixteenth and early-seventeenth centuries. Because of these, Andrewes has been commemorated by literary greats such as T. S. Eliot.

=== John Cosin ===
John Cosin (30 November 1594 – 15 January 1672) was an English priest, bishop and theologian. Cosin was elected Master of Peterhouse, Cambridge in 1634, succeeding Matthew Wren, and decorated the chapel there according to High Church principles. Among his writings (most of which were published posthumously) are a Historia Transubstantiationis Papalis (1675), Notes and Collections on the Book of Common Prayer (1710) and A Scholastical History of the Canon of Holy Scripture (1657). A collected edition of his works, forming 5 volumes of the Oxford-based Library of Anglo-Catholic Theology, was published between 1843 and 1855; and his Correspondence (2 vols) was edited by George Ornsby for the Surtees Society (1868–1870). Cosin's most important work was his Collection of Private Devotions which was published in 1627 at the behest of King Charles I. It made use of patristic sources, Elizabethan devotional material, and Cosin's own compositions. This was the first work of royally-authorised devotional writing since the reign of Elizabeth I and was immensely popular in the seventeenth century. Cosin was exiled in Paris during the Commonwealth, but was made Bishop of Durham at the Restoration in 1660, a post he held until his death.

=== Thomas Ken ===
Thomas Ken (July 1637 – 19 March 1711), English priest, was the most eminent of the English non-juring bishops, and one of the fathers of modern English hymnology. His Three Hymns (1700) contains the original version of the hymn "Praise God from whom all blessings flow", which continues to be sung during offertories around the world, especially in Anglican churches. Ken later left the Church of England during the Nonjuring schism, which developed in response to the invasion of England by the Dutch prince William III. However, as a Nonjuror, Ken remained deeply tied to the Anglican tradition. Nonjurors did not abandon Anglicanism but instead maintained allegiance to the exiled king James II of England. The political counterpart to the Nonjuror schism was Jacobitism. Both ended in the latter half of the eighteenth century with the death of Charles Edward Stuart, the last Stuart claimant to the throne. Nonjuror liturgical, theological, and devotional writing proved to have a considerable impact upon the Anglican tradition, in part due to the influence of the nineteenth-century Oxford Movement.

=== William Laud ===
Archbishop William Laud (7 October 1573 – 10 January 1645) was Archbishop of Canterbury and a fervent supporter of King Charles I of England. Laud was a sincere Anglican and loyal Englishman, who must have been frustrated at the charges of Popery levelled against him by the Puritan element in the Church. Laud's aggressive high church policy was seen by many as a sinister development. He was blamed for the introduction of the 1637 Book of Common Prayer into Scotland, although a similar policy had originated with King James I. Laud's Conference with Fisher the Jesuite is a classic work of Anglican apologetics and has been called 'one of the last great works of scholastic divinity.' Like Andrewes, Laud's Private Devotions were printed posthumously, although they have never been as popular as those by Andrewes.

His views towards the Presbyterians extended to Scotland, where it led to the Covenanter movement and the Bishops' Wars. The Long Parliament of 1640 accused him of treason, resulting in his imprisonment in the Tower of London. In the spring of 1644, he was brought to trial, which ended without being able to reach a verdict. Parliament took up the issue, and eventually he was beheaded on 10 January 1645 on Tower Hill, notwithstanding being granted a royal pardon.

=== Thomas Sprat ===
Thomas Sprat (1635 – 20 May 1713), was an English priest. Having taken orders he became a prebendary of Lincoln Cathedral in 1660. In the preceding year he had gained a reputation by his poem To the Happie Memory of the most Renowned Prince Oliver, Lord Protector (London, 1659), and he was afterwards well known as a wit, preacher, and man of letters.

His chief prose works are the Observations upon Monsieur de Sorbier's Voyage into England (London, 1665), a satirical reply to the strictures on Englishmen in Samuel de Sorbière's book of that name, and a History of the Royal Society of London (London, 1667), which Sprat had helped to found. The History of the Royal Society elaborates the scientific purposes of the academy and outlines some of the strictures of scientific writing that set the modern standards for clarity and conciseness. The work also contains theological defences of scientific study.

=== Jeremy Taylor ===
Jeremy Taylor (1613 – 13 August 1667) was a priest in the Church of England who achieved fame as an author during the Protectorate of Oliver Cromwell. He is sometimes known as the "Shakespeare of Divines" for his poetic style of writing.

Taylor was educated at the Perse School, Cambridge before going onto Gonville and Caius College, at Cambridge, where he graduated in 1626. He was under the patronage of William Laud, Archbishop of Canterbury. He went on to become chaplain in ordinary to Charles I as a result of Laud's sponsorship. This made him politically suspect when Laud was tried for treason and executed in 1645 by the Puritan Parliament during the English Civil War. After the Parliamentary victory over the King, he was briefly imprisoned several times.

Eventually, he was allowed to retire to Wales, where he became the private chaplain of the Earl of Carbery. Upon the Restoration, his political star was on the rise, and he was made Bishop of Down and Connor in Ireland. He was also made vice-chancellor of the University of Dublin.

=== Herbert Thorndike ===
Herbert Thorndike (1598–1672) was Canon of Westminster Abbey. He was also an influential theologian and writer in the Anglican Church who was well respected during the reigns of King Charles I and, after the Restoration, King Charles II. His work had little influence, however, and it was not until the Oxford Movement of the 19th century that he came to be widely read again.

=== George Herbert ===
George Herbert (1593–1633) was a Welsh-born priest who served at the rural parish of Fugglestone St Peter near Salisbury, but is primarily known as a skilled orator and poet. He attended Trinity College, Cambridge in 1609 with the intention of becoming a priest, but instead he became the university's Public Orator and attracted the attention of James I. He served in the Parliament of England in 1624 and briefly in 1625. After the death of James I, Herbert renewed his interest in ordination. He gave up his secular ambitions in his mid-thirties and took holy orders in the Church of England, spending the rest of his life as rector at Fugglestone St Peter. He died at age 39 of consumption in 1633 during the reign of Charles I.

Although he is generally considered a poet rather than a divine, he was a devoted priest and his thought is palpably in line with that of the Caroline divines. His poetry was championed by the later Oxford Movement and notably influenced the piety of the movement through his influence on figures like John Keble.
