= Book of Joshua =

Sixth book of the Bible

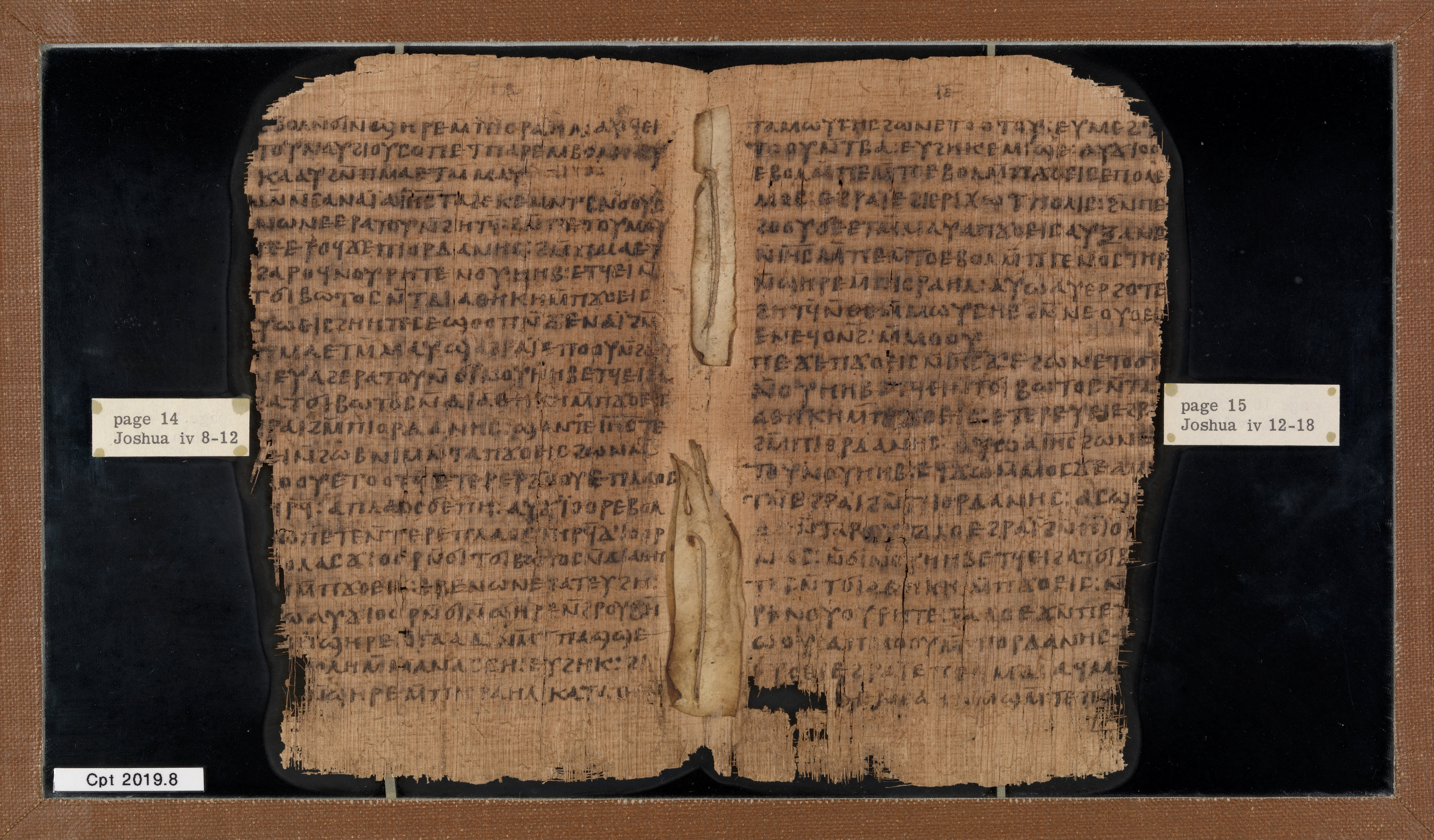
Early 4th-century AD manuscript of Joshua from Egypt, in Coptic translation

The Book of Joshua (Note: Hebrew: סֵפֶר יְהוֹשֻׁעַ Sefer Yehoshua, Biblical: Sipr Yəhōšūaʿ, Tiberian: Sēp̄er Yŏhōšūaʿ; Ancient Greek: Ἰησοῦς τοῦ Ναυή, romanized: Iēsoûs toû Nauḗ; Latin: Liber Iosue) is the sixth book in the Hebrew Bible and the Old Testament, and is the first book of the Deuteronomistic history, the story of Israel from the conquest of Canaan to the Babylonian exile. It tells of the campaigns of the Israelites in central, southern and northern Canaan, the destruction of their enemies, and the division of the land among the Twelve Tribes, framed by two set-piece speeches, the first by God commanding the conquest of the land, and, at the end, the second by Joshua warning of the need for faithful observance of the Law (torah) revealed to Moses.

The Book of Joshua is historically problematic. The conquest of Canaan as described in the Book of Joshua is not historically factual; archaeology instead indicates an indigenous, gradual emergence of Israel from Canaanite society.

The earliest parts of the book are possibly chapters 2–11, the story of the conquest; these chapters were later incorporated into an early form of Joshua likely written late in the reign of king Josiah (reigned 640–609 BC), but the book was not completed until after the fall of Jerusalem to the Neo-Babylonian Empire in 586 BC, and possibly not until after the return from the Babylonian exile in 539 BC.

Many scholars interpret the book of Joshua as describing what would now be considered genocide. Other scholars counter that calling what the book of Joshua relates a "genocide" is anachronistic.

== Contents ==
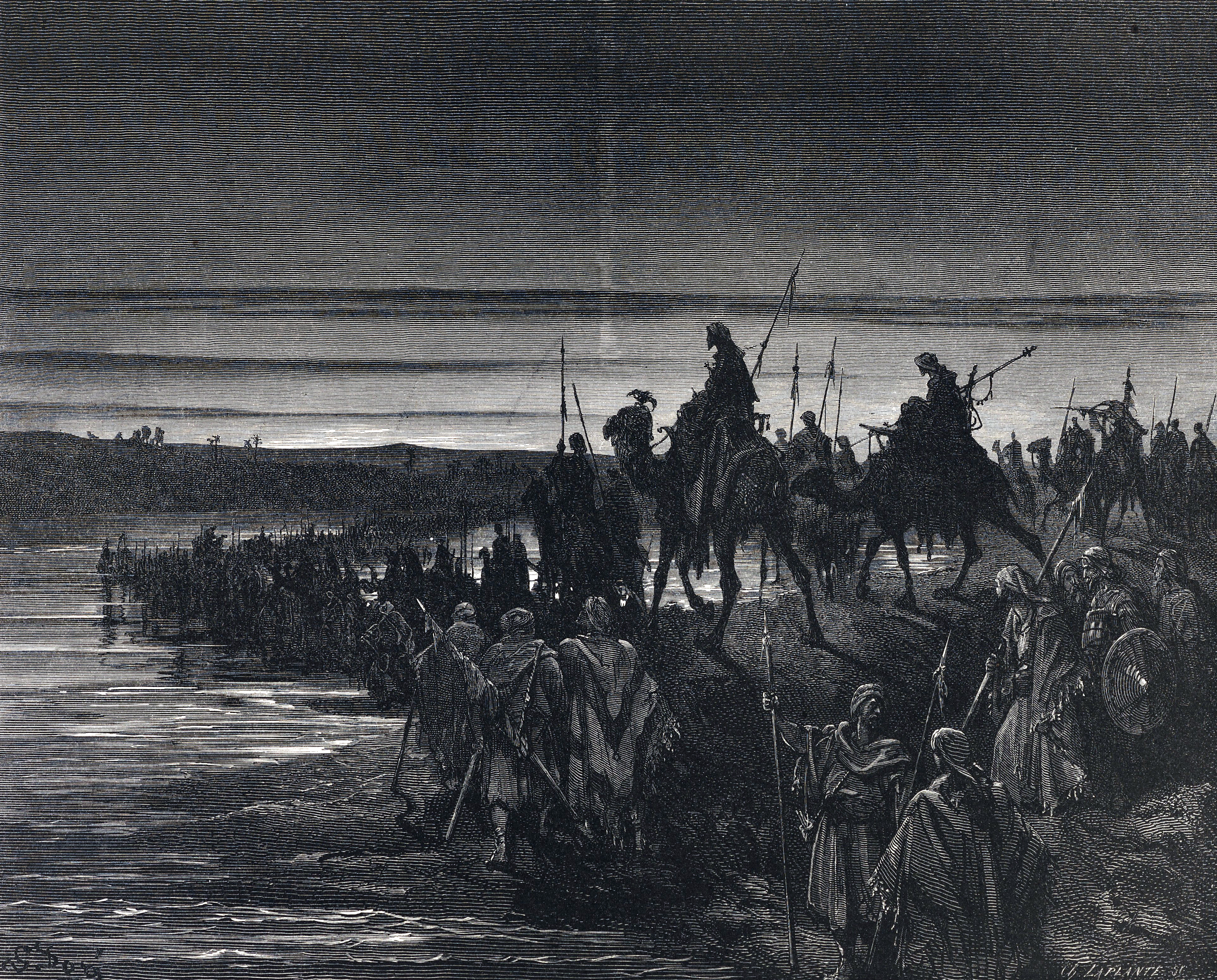
Joshua and the Israelites crossing the Jordan (Gustave Doré)

=== Structure ===
I. Transfer of leadership to Joshua (1:1–18)

A. God's commission to Joshua (1:1–9)
B. Joshua's instructions to the people (1:10–18)

II. Entrance into and conquest of Canaan (2:1–12:24)

A. Entry into Canaan

1. Reconnaissance of Jericho (2:1–24)
2. Crossing the River Jordan (3:1–17)
3. Establishing a foothold at Gilgal (4:1–5:1)
4. Circumcision and Passover (5:2–15)

B. Victory over Canaan (6:1–12:24)

1. Destruction of Jericho (6)
2. Failure and success at Ai (7:1–8:29)
3. Renewal of the covenant at Mount Ebal (8:30–35)
4. Other campaigns in central Canaan. The Gibeonite Deception (9:1–27)
5. Campaigns in southern Canaan (10:1–43)
6. Campaigns in northern Canaan (11:1–15)
7. Summary of lands conquered (11:16–23)
8. Summary list of defeated kings (12:1–24)

III. Division of the land among the tribes (13:1–22:34)

A. God's instructions to Joshua (13:1–7)
B. Tribal allotments (13:8–19:51)

1. Eastern tribes (13:8–33)
2. Western tribes (14:1–19:51)

C. Cities of refuge and levitical cities (20:1–21:42)
D. Summary of conquest (21:43–45)
E. De-commissioning of the eastern tribes (22:1–34)

IV. Conclusion (23:1–24:33)

A. Joshua's farewell address (23:1–16)
B. Covenant at Shechem (24:1–28)
C. Deaths of Joshua and Eleazar; burial of Joseph's bones (24:29–33)

=== Narrative ===
==== God's commission to Joshua (chapter 1) ====
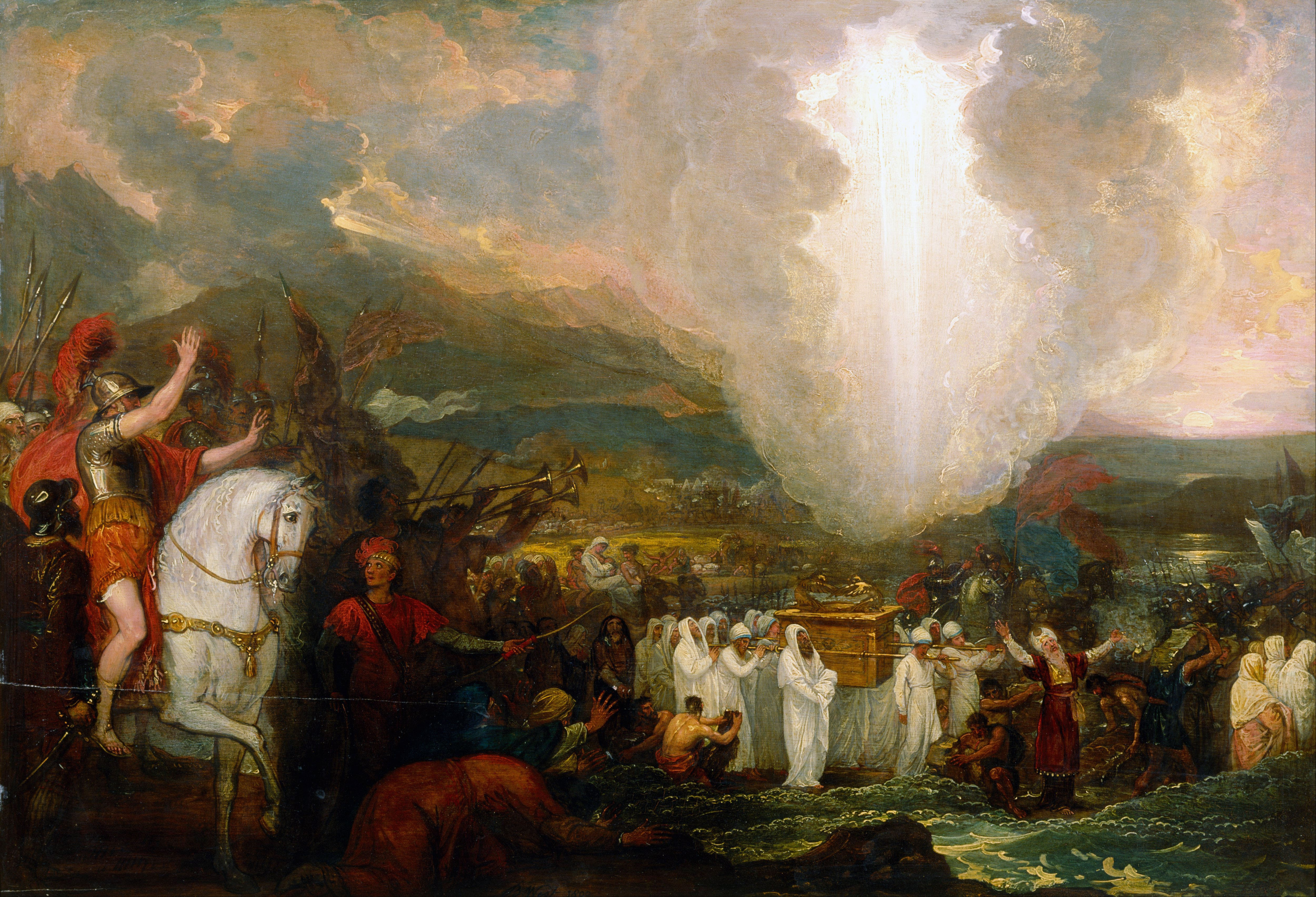
Joshua passing the River Jordan with the Ark of the Covenant, painted by Benjamin West, 1800

Chapter 1 commences "after the death of Moses" and presents the first of three important moments in Joshua marked with major speeches and reflections by the main characters; here first God, and then Joshua, make speeches about the goal of conquest of the Promised Land; in chapter 12, the narrator looks back on the conquest; and in chapter 23 Joshua gives a speech about what must be done if Israel is to live in peace in the land.

God commissions Joshua to take possession of the land and warns him to keep faith with the Mosaic covenant. God's speech foreshadows the major themes of the book: the crossing of the Jordan River and conquest of the land, its distribution, and the imperative need for obedience to the Law. Joshua's own immediate obedience is seen in his speeches to the Israelite commanders and to the Transjordanian tribes, and the Transjordanians' affirmation of Joshua's leadership echoes Yahweh's assurances of victory.

==== Entry into the land and conquest (chapters 2–12) ====
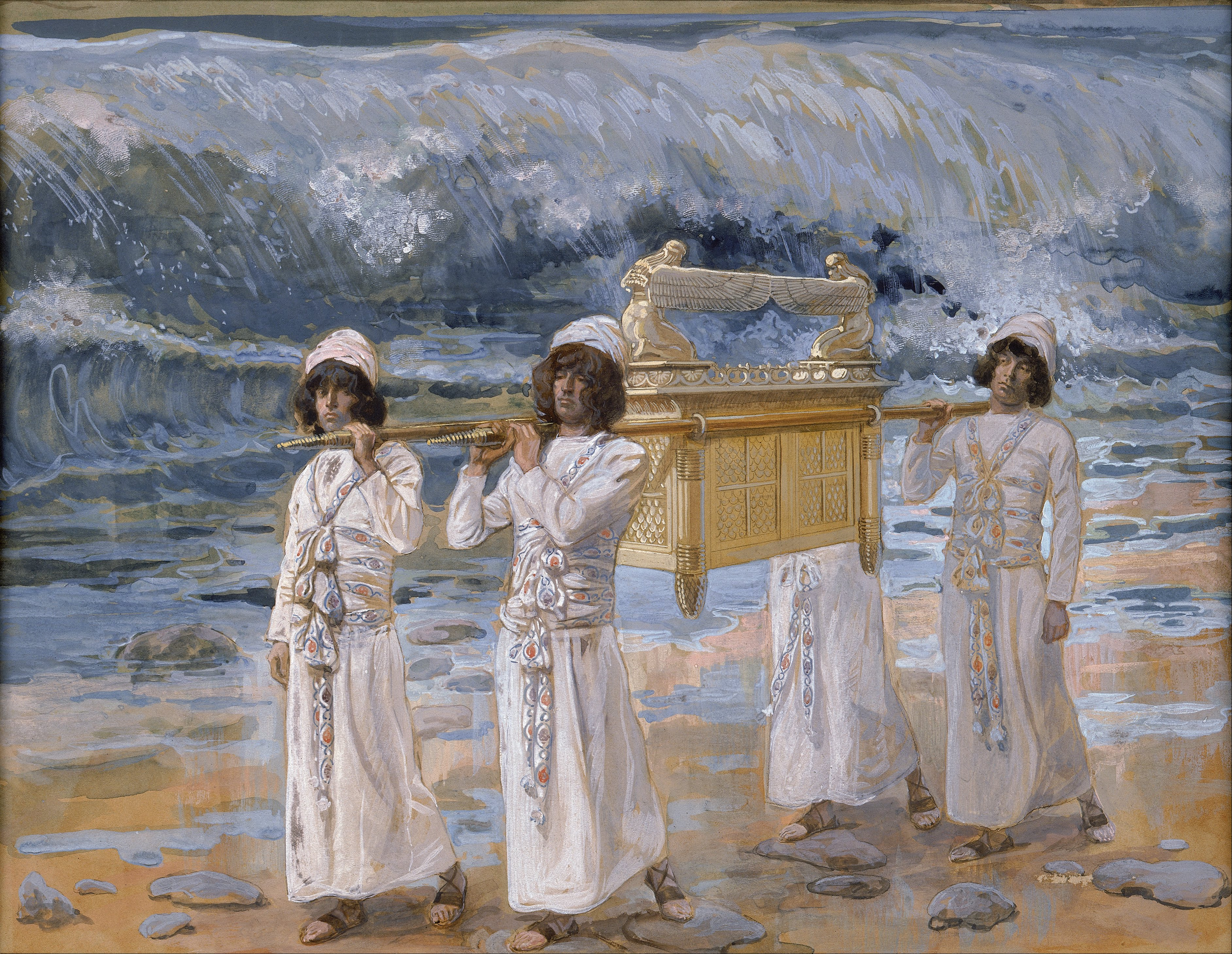
The Ark Passes Over the Jordan (watercolor c. 1896–1902 by James Tissot)

Rahab, a Canaanite woman of the Bible, sets in motion the entrance into Canaan by the Israelites. To avoid repeating failed attempts by Moses to have notable men of Israel predict the success rate of entry into Canaan mentioned in the book of Numbers, Joshua tasks two regular men with entering Jericho as spies. They arrive at Rahab's house and spend the night. The king of Jericho, having heard of possible Israelite spies, demands that Rahab reveal the men. She tells him that she is unaware of their whereabouts, when in reality, she hid them on her roof under flax. The next morning, Rahab professes her faith in God to the men and acknowledges her belief that Canaan was divinely reserved for the Israelites from the beginning. Because of Rahab's actions, the Israelites are able to enter Canaan.

The Israelites cross the Jordan River through a miraculous intervention of God with the Ark of the Covenant and are circumcised at Gibeath-Haaraloth (translated as hill of foreskins), renamed Gilgal in memory. Gilgal sounds like Gallothi, "I have removed", but is more likely to translate as "circle of standing stones". The conquest begins with the battle of Jericho, followed by Ai (central Canaan), after which Joshua builds an altar to Yahweh at Mount Ebal in northern Canaan and renews the Covenant in a ceremony with elements of a divine land-grant ceremony, similar to ceremonies known from Mesopotamia.

The narrative then switches to the south. The Gibeonites trick the Israelites into entering an alliance with them by saying that they are not Canaanites. Despite this, the Israelites decide to keep the alliance by enslaving them instead. An alliance of Amorite kingdoms headed by the Canaanite king of Jerusalem attacks the Gibeonites but they are defeated with Yahweh's miraculous help of stopping the Sun and the Moon, and hurling down large hailstones (Joshua 10:10–14). The enemy kings were eventually hanged on trees. The Deuteronomist author may have used the then-recent 701 BC campaign of the Assyrian king Sennacherib in the Kingdom of Judah as his model; the hanging of the captured kings is in accordance with Assyrian practice of the 8th century BC.

With the south conquered the narrative moves to the northern campaign. A powerful multi-national (or more accurately, multi-ethnic) coalition headed by the king of Hazor, the most important northern city, is defeated at the Battle of the Waters of Merom with Yahweh's help. Hazor itself is then captured and destroyed. Chapter 11:16–23 summarises the extent of the conquest: Joshua has taken the entire land, almost entirely through military victories, with only the Gibeonites agreeing to peaceful terms with Israel. The land then "had rest from war" (Joshua 11:23, repeated at 14:15). Chapter 12 lists the vanquished kings on both sides of the Jordan River: the two kings who ruled east of the Jordan who were defeated under Moses' leadership (Joshua 12:1–6; cf. Numbers 21), and the 31 kings on the west of the Jordan who were defeated under Joshua's leadership (Joshua 12:7–24). The list of the 31 kings is quasi-tabular:

the king of Jerusalem, one; the king of Hebron, one;
the king of Jarmuth, one; the king of Lachish, one; (etc.; Joshua 12:10–11).

==== Division of the land (chapters 13–22) ====
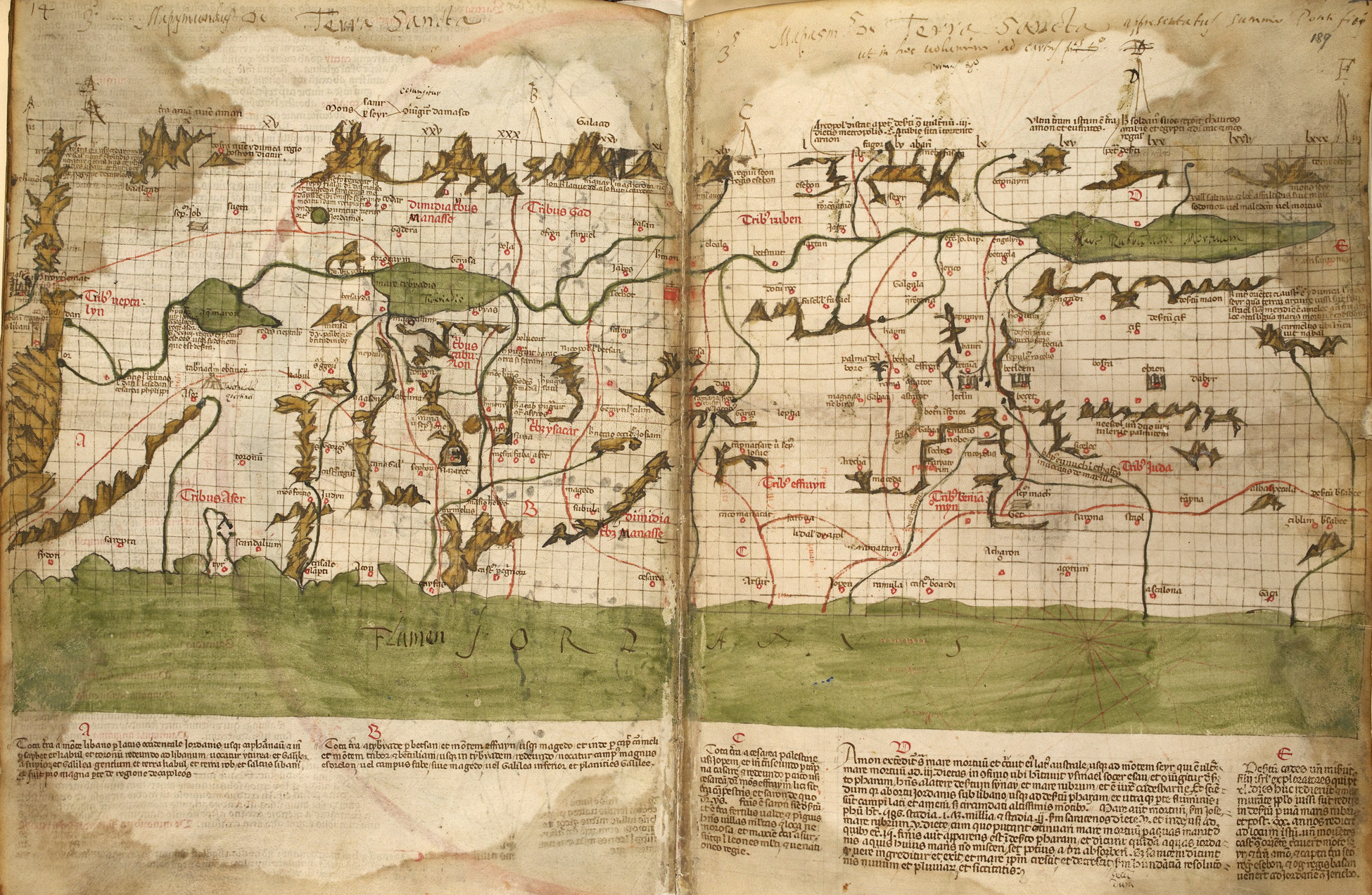
Map of the Holy Land, Pietro Vesconte, 1321, showing the allotments of the tribes of Israel. Described by Adolf Erik Nordenskiöld as "the first non-Ptolemaic map of a definite country".

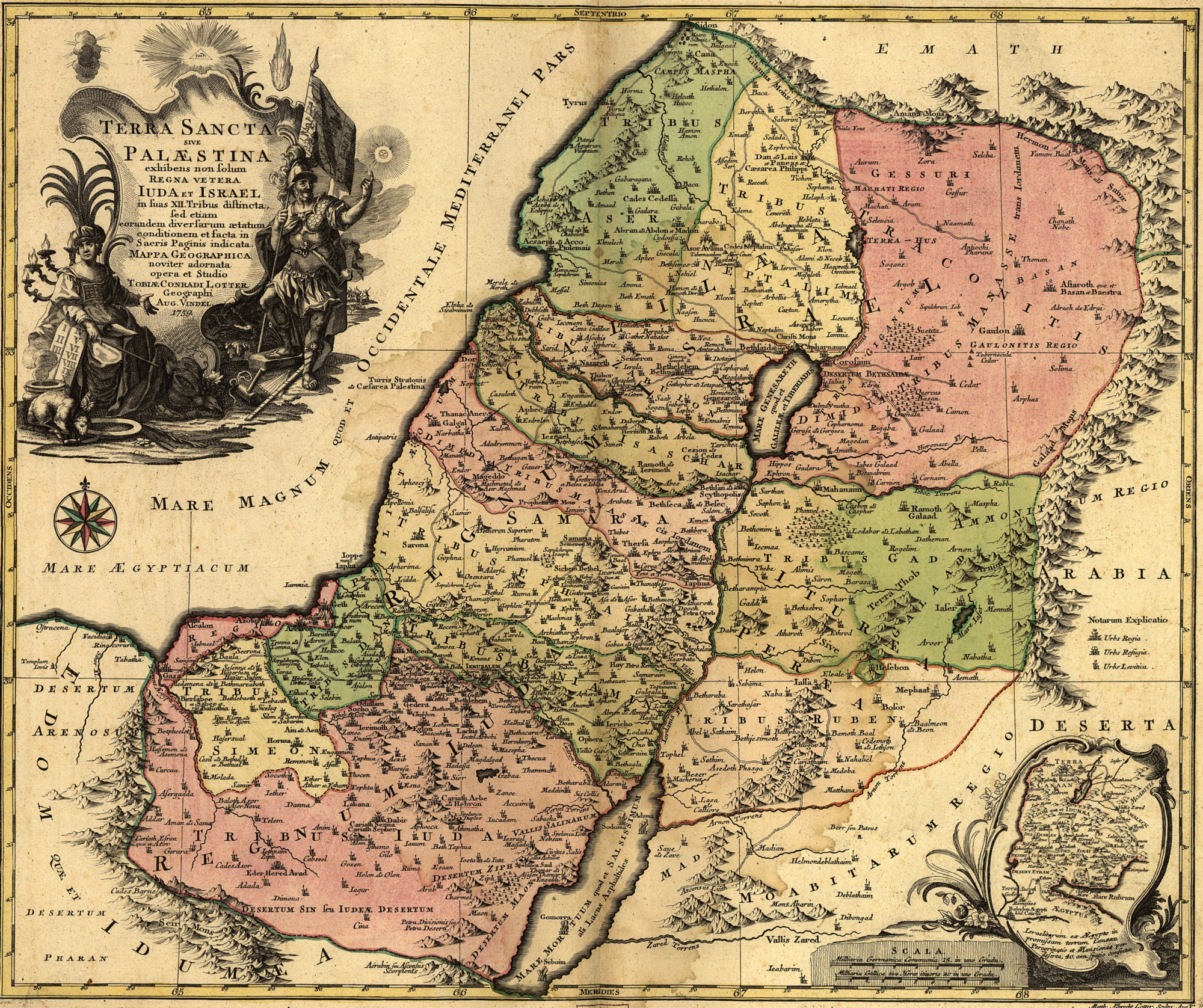
1759 map of the tribal allotments of Israel

Having described how the Israelites and Joshua have carried out the first of their God's commands, the narrative now turns to the second: to "put the people in possession of the land." Joshua is "old, advanced (or stricken) in years" by this time.

This land distribution is a "covenantal land grant": Yahweh, as king, is issuing each tribe its territory. The "Cities of Refuge" and Levitical cities are attached to the end, since it is necessary for the tribes to receive their grants before they allocate parts of it to others. The Transjordanian tribes are dismissed, affirming their loyalty to Yahweh.

The book reaffirms Moses' allocation of land east of the Jordan to the tribes of Reuben and Gad and the half-tribe of Manasseh, and then describes how Joshua divided the newly conquered land of Canaan into parcels, and assigned them to the tribes by lot. Joshua 14:1 also makes reference to the role of Eleazar the priest (ahead of Joshua) in the distribution process. The description serves a theological function to show how the promise of the land was realized in the biblical narrative; its origins are unclear, but the descriptions may reflect geographical relations among the places named.

The wording of Joshua 18:1–4 suggests that the tribes of Reuben, Gad, Judah, Ephraim and Manasseh received their land allocation some time before the "remaining seven tribes", and a 21-member expedition set out to survey the remainder of the land with a view to organising the allocation to the tribes of Simeon, Benjamin, Asher, Naphtali, Zebulun, Issachar and Dan. Subsequently, 48 cities with their surrounding lands were allocated to the Tribe of Levi.

Omitted in the Masoretic Text, but present in the Septuagint, is a statement that:

Joshua completed the division of the land in its boundaries, and the children gave a portion to Joshua, by the commandment of the Lord. They gave to him the city for which he asked, Thamnath Sarach gave they him in Mount Ephraim, and Joshua built the city, and dwelt in it. And Joshua took the stone knives with which he had circumcised the children of Israel, which were in the way in the wilderness, and he placed them in Tamnath Sarach.

By the end of chapter 21, the narrative records that the fulfilment of God's promise of land, rest and supremacy over the enemies of the Israelites was complete. The tribes to whom Moses had granted land east of the Jordan are authorized to return home to Gilead (here used in the widest sense for the whole Transjordan district), having faithfully 'kept the charge' of supporting the tribes occupying Canaan. They are granted "riches... with very much livestock, with silver, with gold, with bronze, with iron, and with very much clothing" as a reward.

==== Joshua's farewell speeches (chapters 23–24) ====
Joshua, in his old age and conscious that he is "going the way of all the earth", gathers the leaders of the Israelites together and reminds them of Yahweh's great works for them, and of the need to love Yahweh. The Israelites are told – just as Joshua himself had been told – that they must comply with "all that is written in the Book of the Law of Moses", neither "turn[ing] aside from it to the right hand or to the left" (i.e. by adding to the law, or diminishing from it).

Joshua meets again with all the people at Shechem in chapter 24 and addresses them a second time. He recounts the history of God's formation of the Israelite nation, beginning with "Terah, the father of Abraham and Nahor, [who] lived beyond the Euphrates River and worshiped other gods." He invited the Israelites to choose between serving the Lord who had delivered them from Egypt, or the gods which their ancestors had served on the other side of the Euphrates, or the gods of the Amorites in whose land they now lived. The people chose to serve the Lord, a decision which Joshua recorded in the Book of the Law of God. He then erected a memorial stone "under the oak that was by the sanctuary of the Lord" in Shechem. The oak is associated with the Oak of Moreh where, during his travels in this area, Abram built an altar after the Lord appeared to him.Thus "Joshua made a covenant with the people", literally "cut a covenant", a phrase common to the Hebrew, Greek, and Latin languages. It derives from the custom of sacrifice, in which the victims were cut in pieces and offered to the deity invoked in ratification of the engagement.

The people then returned to their inheritance, i.e., their allocated lands.

==== Closing items ====
The Book of Joshua closes with three concluding items (referred to in the Jerusalem Bible as "Two Additions"):

The death of Joshua and his burial at Timnath-serah
The burial of the bones of Joseph at Shechem
The death of Eleazar and his burial in land belonging to Phinehas in the mountains of Ephraim.

There were no Levitical cities given to the descendants of Aaron in Ephraim, so theologians Carl Friedrich Keil and Franz Delitzsch supposed the land may have been at Geba in the territory of the Tribe of Benjamin: "the situation, 'upon the mountains of Ephraim', is not at variance with this view, as these mountains extended, according to Judges 4:5, etc., far into the territory of Benjamin".

In some manuscripts and editions of the Septuagint, there is an additional verse relating to the apostasy of the Israelites after Joshua's death.

== Composition ==
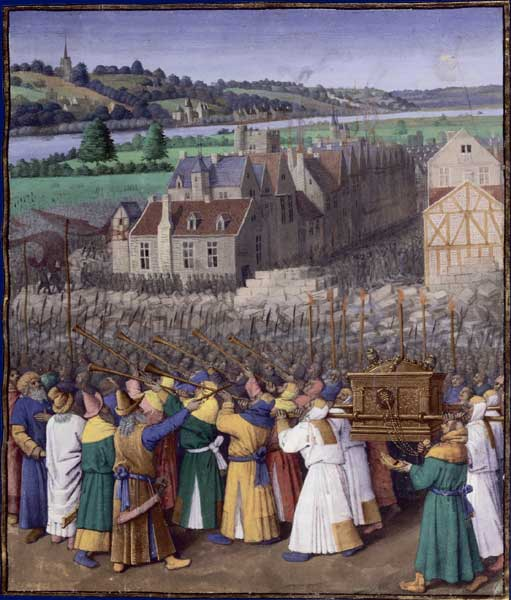
The Taking of Jericho (Jean Fouquet, c. 1452–1460)

=== Authorship and date ===
The Book of Joshua is an anonymous work. The Babylonian Talmud, written in the 3rd to 5th centuries AD, attributed it to Joshua himself, but this idea was rejected as untenable by John Calvin (1509–64), and by the time of Thomas Hobbes (1588–1679) it was recognised that the book must have been written much later than the period it depicted. There is now general agreement that it was composed as part of a larger work, the Deuteronomistic history, stretching from the Book of Deuteronomy to the Books of Kings, composed first at the court of king Josiah in the late 7th century BC, and extensively revised in the 6th century BC.

=== Historicity ===
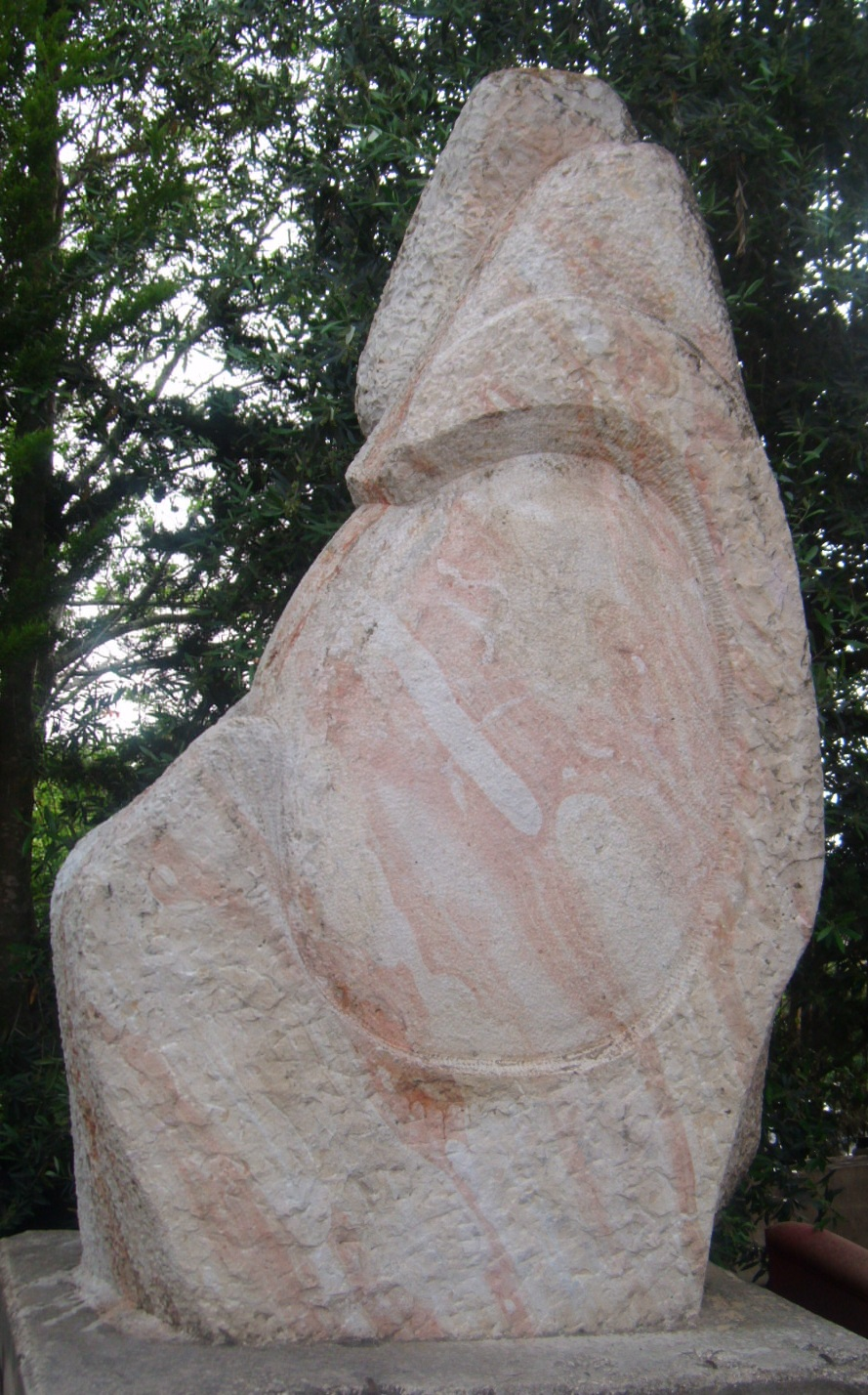
"Sun, stand thou still upon Gibeon" (sculpture by Shmuel Bar-Even)

The prevailing scholarly view is that Joshua is not a factual account of historical events. The apparent setting of Joshua in the 13th century BC corroborates with the Bronze Age Collapse, which was indeed a time of widespread city-destruction. However, with a few exceptions (Hazor, Lachish), the destroyed cities are not the ones the Bible associates with Joshua, and the ones it does associate with him show little or no sign of even being occupied at the time. Earlier archaeological evidence indicates that Jericho and Ai were not occupied in the Near Eastern Late Bronze Age, although recent excavations at Jericho have questioned this.

According to Eerdmans Dictionary of the Bible, the story of the conquest represents the nationalist propaganda of the 8th-century BC kings of Judah and their claims to the territory of the Kingdom of Israel; incorporated into an early form of Joshua written late in the reign of king Josiah (reigned 640–609 BC). The Book of Joshua was probably revised and completed after the fall of Jerusalem to the Neo-Babylonian Empire in 586 BC, and possibly after the return from the Babylonian exile in 538 BC.

In the 1930s Martin Noth made a sweeping criticism of the usefulness of the Book of Joshua for history. Noth was a student of Albrecht Alt, who emphasized form criticism (whose pioneer had been Hermann Gunkel in the 19th century) and the importance of etiology. Alt and Noth posited a peaceful movement of the Israelites into various areas of Canaan, in contradiction to the Biblical account. American archaeologist William F. Albright questioned the "tenacity" of etiologies, which were key to Noth's analysis of the campaigns in Joshua.

The site of Et-Tell (identified as Ai) was first excavated by Judith Marquet-Krause. Her investigations in the 1930s showed that the city, an early target for conquest in the putative Joshua account, had existed and been destroyed, but in the 22nd century BC. Some alternate sites for Ai, such as Khirbet el-Maqatir or Khirbet Nisya, have been proposed which would partially resolve the discrepancy in dates, but these sites have not been widely accepted. In 1951, Kathleen Kenyon showed that City IV at Tell es-Sultan (Jericho) was destroyed at the end of the Middle Bronze Age (c. 2100–1550 BC), not during the Late Bronze Age (c. 1550–1200 BC). Kenyon argued that the early Israelite campaign could not be historically corroborated, but rather explained as an etiology of the location and a representation of the Israelite settlement. Although this destruction is dated to 16th century by carbon dating, scholars propose that this destruction could be ascribed to either Ahmose I (1549–1524 BC), whose royal signet was found in the necropolis in a slightly later LB I tomb, or Tuthmose III (1479–1425 BC), whose scarab was recovered from a cemetery northwest of Jericho.

More recently, Lorenzo Nigro of the Italian-Palestinian Expedition to Tell es-Sultan has argued that there was a later settlement (City V) at the site during the 14th and 13th centuries BC. He states that the expedition detected Late Bronze Age II layers in several parts of the tell, although its upper layers were heavily cut by leveling operations during the Iron Age, which explains the low amount of 13th-century materials. Nigro says that the idea that the Biblical account should have a literal archaeological correspondence is erroneous, and "any attempt to seriously identify something on the ground with biblical personages and their acts" is hazardous.

In 1955, G. Ernest Wright discussed the correlation of archaeological data to the early Israelite campaigns, which he divided into three phases per the Book of Joshua. He pointed to two sets of archaeological findings that "seem to suggest that the biblical account is in general correct regarding the nature of the late thirteenth and twelfth-eleventh centuries in the country" (i.e., "a period of tremendous violence"). He gives particular weight to what were then recent digs at Hazor by Yigael Yadin.

Archaeologist Amnon Ben-Tor of the Hebrew University of Jerusalem, who replaced Yadin as the supervisor of excavations at Hazor in 1990, believed that recently unearthed evidence of violent destruction by burning verifies the Biblical account of the city's conquest by the Israelites. In 2012, a team led by Ben-Tor and Sharon Zuckerman discovered a scorched palace from the 13th century BC in whose storerooms they found 3,400-year-old ewers holding burned crops. Sharon Zuckerman did not agree with Ben-Tor's theory, and claimed that the burning was the result of the city's numerous factions opposing each other with excessive force.

In her commentary for the Westminster Bible Companion series, Carolyn Pressler suggested that readers of Joshua should give priority to its theological message ("what passages teach about God") and be aware of what these would have meant to audiences in the 7th and 6th centuries BC. Richard Nelson explained that the needs of the centralised monarchy favoured a single story of origins, combining old traditions of an exodus from Egypt, belief in a national god as "divine warrior", and explanations for ruined cities, social stratification and ethnic groups, and contemporary tribes.

Lester L. Grabbe states that when he was studying for his doctorate (more than three decades before 2007), the "substantial historicity" of the Bible's stories of the patriarchs and the conquest of Canaan was widely accepted, but today it is hard to find a historian who still believes in it.

Ann E. Killebrew writes that, while archaeological findings at Hazor and the Mount Ebal altar and a few literary elements suggest that the Book of Joshua may preserve some real memories of Israel's early history in Canaan, "consensus exists that, whatever its sources (either oral and/or written), the conquest account as narrated is historically problematic and should be treated with caution."

In 2005, Pierre de Miroschedji published an article in the journal La Recherche. He wrote:

In general, no serious archaeologist today believes that the events narrated in the Book of Joshua have any real historical basis. Archaeological surveys, especially in the early 1990s, have revealed that the Israelite culture arose in the hills of the central part of the country, as a continuation of the Canaanite culture of the previous era.

The consensus of historians is that the ancient Israelites did not enter Canaan from outside and did not conquer it in a military campaign.

"there is little that we can salvage from Joshua's stories of the rapid, wholesale destruction of Canaanite cities and the annihilation of the local population. It simply did not happen; the archeological evidence is indisputable." This is the judgment of one of the more conservative historians of ancient Israel. To be sure, there are far more conservative historians who try to defend the historicity of the entire biblical account beginning with Abraham, but their work rests on confessional presuppositions and is an exercise in apologetics rather than historiography. Most biblical scholars have come to terms with the fact that much (not all!) of the biblical narrative is only loosely related to history and cannot be verified.

— John J. Collins

On point 3, there was no statistically significant military conquest of Canaan in the thirteenth–twelfth centuries BCE. The evidence is overwhelmingly in support of various “indigenous origins” models, emphasizing “long-term” social and cultural evolution from “Canaanite” to “Israelite” ethnicity. No mainstream biblicist or archaeologist any longer espouses the conquest model.

— William G. Dever (2023)

=== Manuscripts ===
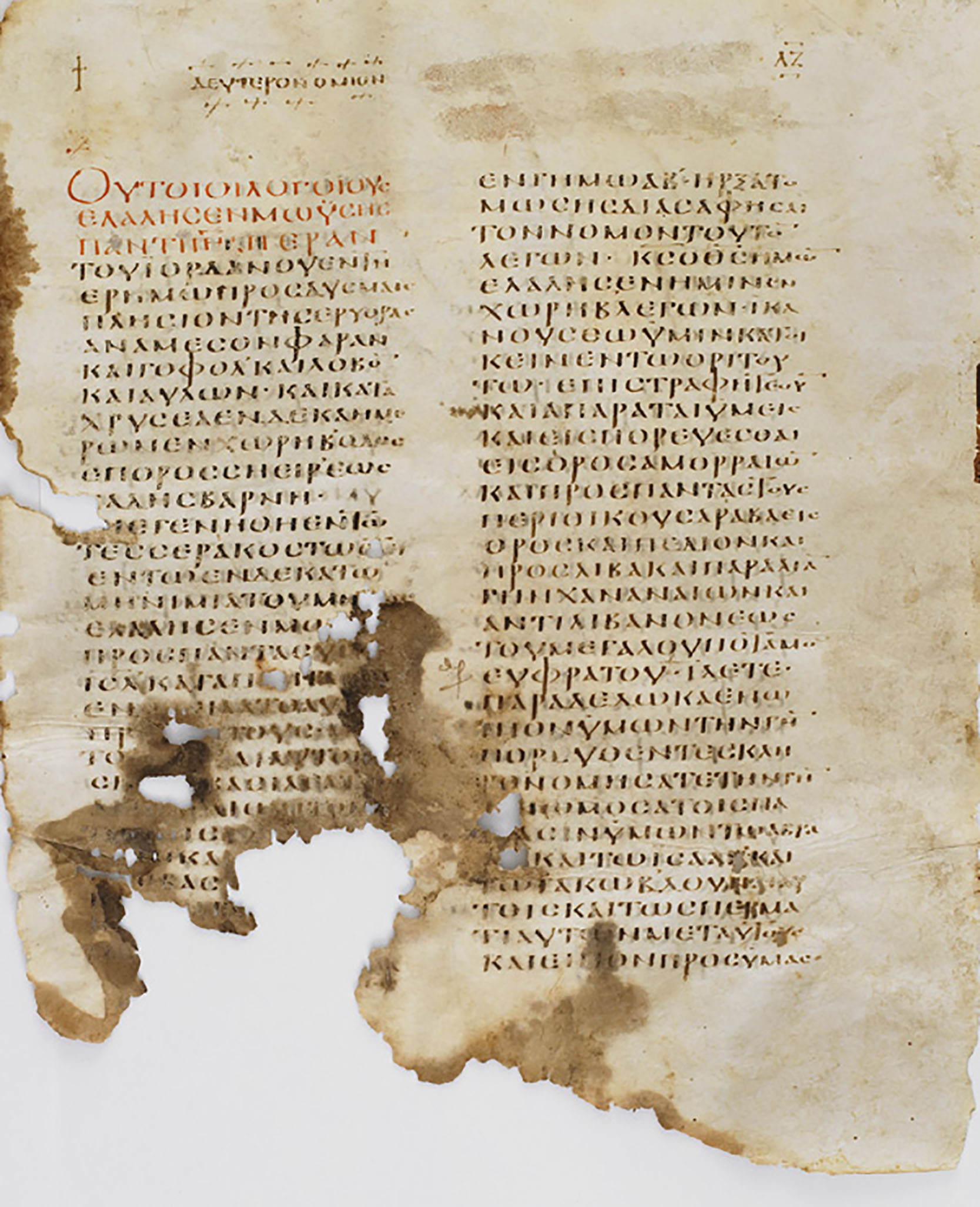
Washington Manuscript I, a Greek manuscript featuring the end of Deuteronomy and beginning of Joshua

Fragments of Joshua dating to the Hasmonean period were found among the Dead Sea Scrolls (4QJosh^{a} and 4QJosh^{b}, found in Qumran Cave 4). The Septuagint (Greek translation) is found in manuscripts such as Washington Manuscript I (5th century AD), and a reduced version of the Septuagint text is found in the illustrated Joshua Roll. The earliest complete copy of the book in Hebrew is in the Aleppo Codex (10th century AD).

== Themes ==
=== Faith and wrath ===
The overarching theological theme of the Deuteronomistic history is faithfulness and God's mercy, and their opposites, faithlessness and God's wrath. In the Book of Judges, the Books of Samuel, and the Books of Kings, the Israelites become faithless and God ultimately shows his anger by sending his people into exile. But in Joshua Israel is obedient, Joshua is faithful, and God fulfills his promise and gives them the land as a result. Yahweh's war campaign in Canaan validates Israel's entitlement to the land and provides a paradigm of how Israel was to live there: twelve tribes, with a designated leader, united by covenant in warfare and in worship of Yahweh alone at a single sanctuary, all in obedience to the commands of Moses as found in the Book of Deuteronomy.

=== God and Israel ===
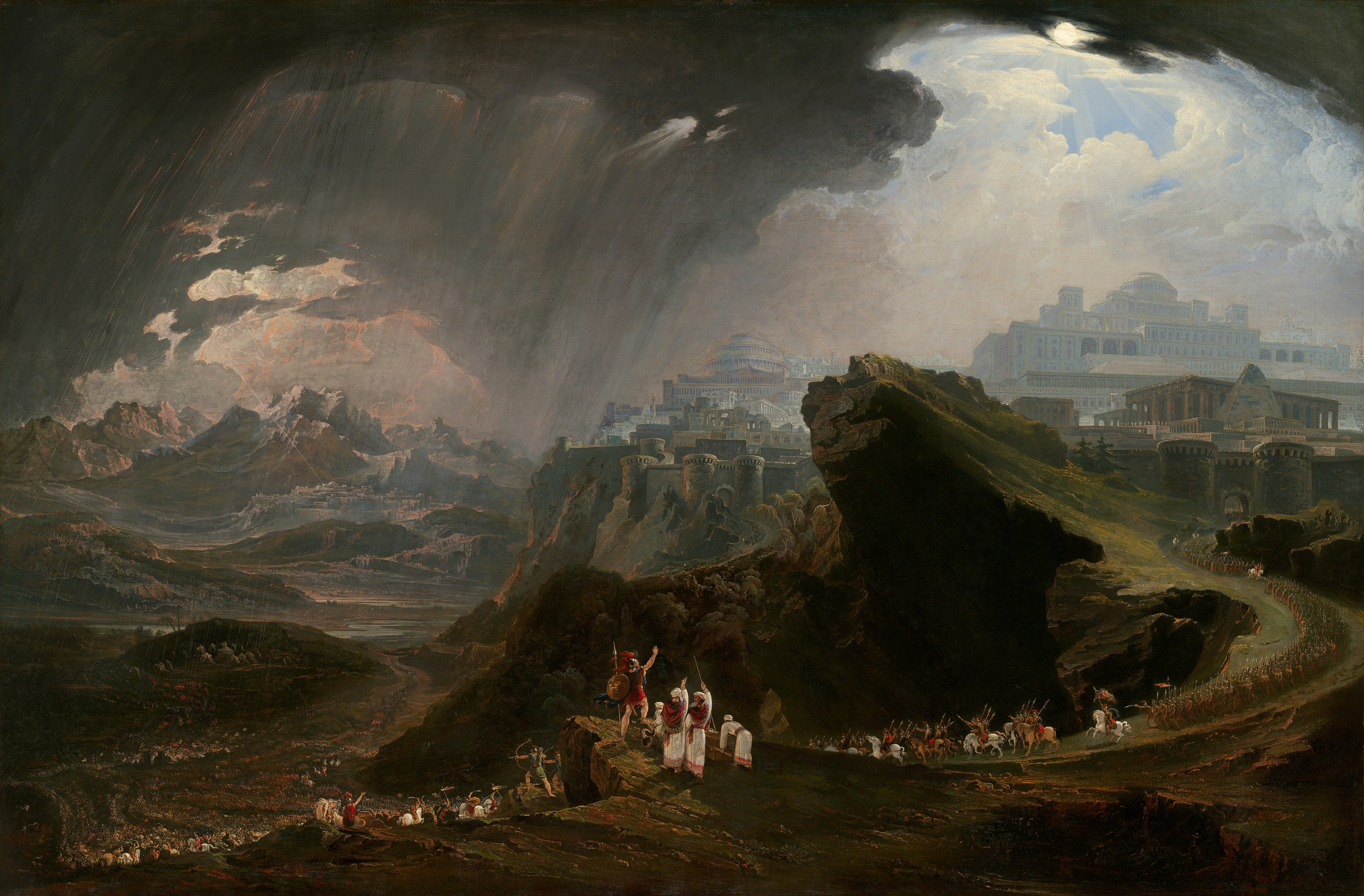
Joshua Commanding the Sun to Stand Still upon Gibeon (John Martin)

The Book of Joshua takes forward Deuteronomy's theme of Israel as a single people worshipping Yahweh in the land God has given them. Yahweh, as the main character in the book, takes the initiative in conquering the land, and Yahweh's power wins the battles. For example, the walls of Jericho fall because Yahweh fights for Israel, not because the Israelites show superior fighting ability. The potential disunity of Israel is a constant theme, the greatest threat of disunity coming from the tribes east of the Jordan. Chapter 22:19 even hints that the land across the Jordan is unclean and that the tribes who live there have secondary status.

=== Land ===
Land is the central topic of Joshua. The introduction to Deuteronomy recalled how Yahweh had given the land to the Israelites but then withdrew the gift when Israel showed fear and only Joshua and Caleb had trusted in God. The land is Yahweh's to give or to withhold, and the fact that he has promised it to Israel gives Israel an inalienable right to take it. For exilic and post-exilic readers, the land was both the sign of Yahweh's faithfulness and Israel's unfaithfulness, as well as the centre of their ethnic identity. In Deuteronomistic theology, "rest" meant Israel's unthreatened possession of the land, the achievement of which began with the conquests of Joshua.

=== The enemy ===
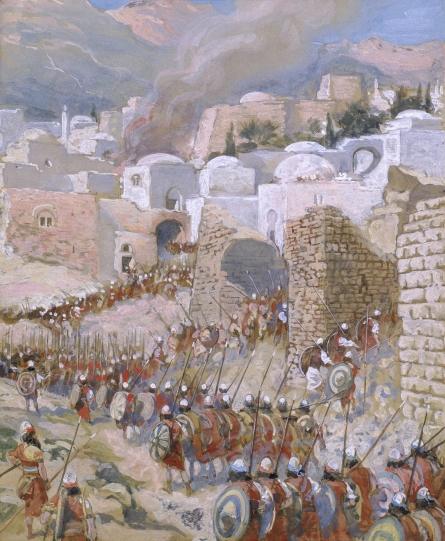
The Taking of Jericho (watercolor c. 1896–1902 by James Tissot)

William G. Dever writes that Joshua "carries out a systematic campaign against the civilians of Canaan – men, women and children – that amounts to genocide" although other scholars reject using "genocide" as a label to describe the conquest. This practice was known as herem, as described in Deuteronomy 20:17, which entailed no treaties with the enemy, no mercy, and no intermarriage. "The extermination of the nations glorifies Yahweh as a warrior and promotes Israel's claim to the land," while their continued survival "explores the themes of disobedience and penalty and looks forward to the story told in Judges and Kings." The divine call for massacre at Jericho and elsewhere can be explained in terms of cultural norms (Israel was not the only Iron Age state to practice herem) and theology (e.g. to ensure Israel's purity, fulfill God's promise, judge the Canaanites for their "sexual misconduct"). The violent language within the story has also been taken by several scholars as being hyperbolic, drawing comparisons between the biblical account and extrabiblical military reports.

Patrick D. Miller in his commentary on Deuteronomy, writes that "there is no real way to make such reports palatable to the hearts and minds of contemporary readers and believers," and that the "tension between the Israelites and its neighbors was fundamentally a religious conflict," writing further for the need to understand what the reports teach "so that they make some sense to us in the whole." Miller writes further that the "Deuteronomistic history in Joshua through Second Kings is a story of constant or recurring apostasy" and that for the Israelites, maintaining their allegiance with Yahweh "required, in their sight, removal of all temptation." Nissim Amzallag sees similarities between Joshua's conquest and the return of Judean exiles in Ezra-Nehemiah but compared to the former, the Judeans merely refrained from intermarrying the "Canaanites". These "Canaanites" were most likely non-exiled Judeans, who were contaminated with "foreign influence".

=== Obedience ===
Obedience versus disobedience is a constant theme of the work. Obedience ties in the Jordan crossing, the defeat of Jericho and Ai, circumcision and Passover, and the public display and reading of the Law. Disobedience appears in the story of Achan (stoned for violating the herem command), the Gibeonites, and the altar built by the Transjordan tribes. Joshua's two final addresses challenge the Israel of the future (the readers of the story) to obey the most important command of all, to worship Yahweh and no other gods. Joshua thus illustrates the central Deuteronomistic message, that obedience leads to success and disobedience to ruin.

=== Moses, Joshua and Josiah ===
The Deuteronomistic history draws parallels in proper leadership between Moses, Joshua and Josiah. God's commission to Joshua in chapter 1 is framed as a royal installation. The people's pledge of loyalty to Joshua as the successor of Moses recalls royal practices. The covenant-renewal ceremony led by Joshua was the prerogative of the kings of Judah. God's command to Joshua to meditate on the "book of the law" day and night parallels the description of Josiah in 2 Kings 23:25 as a king uniquely concerned with the study of the law. The two figures had identical territorial goals; Josiah died in 609 BC while attempting to annex the former Israel to his own kingdom of Judah.

Some of the parallels with Moses can be seen in the following, and not exhaustive, list:

- Joshua sent spies to scout out the land near Jericho, just as Moses sent spies from the wilderness to scout out the Promised Land
- Joshua led the Israelites out of the wilderness into the Promised Land, crossing the Jordan River as if on dry ground, just as Moses led the Israelites out of Egypt through the Red Sea, which they crossed as if on dry land
- After crossing the Jordan River, the Israelites celebrated the Passover just as they did immediately before the Exodus
- Joshua's vision of the "commander of Yahweh's army" is reminiscent of the divine revelation to Moses in the burning bush
- Joshua successfully intercedes on behalf of the Israelites when Yahweh is angry for their failure to fully observe the "ban" (herem), just as Moses frequently persuaded God not to punish the people
- Joshua and the Israelites were able to defeat the people at Ai because Joshua followed the divine instruction to extend his sword, just as the people were able to defeat the Amalekites as long as Moses extended his hand that held the staff of God
- Joshua is "old, advanced in years" at the time when the Israelites can begin to settle on the promised land, just as Moses was old when he died having seen, but not entered, the Promised Land
- Joshua served as the mediator of the renewed covenant between Yahweh and Israel at Shechem, just as Moses was the mediator of Yahweh's covenant with the people at Mount Sinai/Mount Horeb.
- Before his death, Joshua delivered a farewell address to the Israelites, just as Moses had delivered his farewell address.
- Moses lived to be 120 and Joshua lived to be 110.

== Moral and political interpretations ==
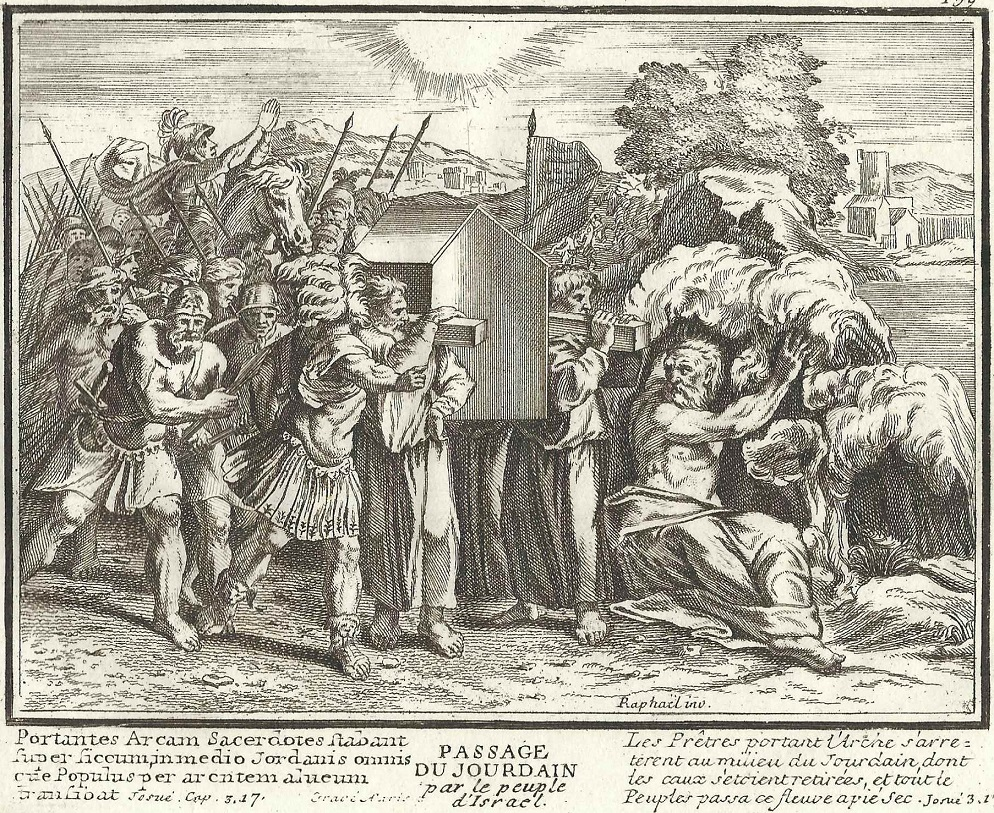
Joshua Leading the Israelites Across the Jordan on 10th of Nisan

The Book of Joshua deals with the conquest of the Land of Israel and its settlement, which are politically charged issues in Israeli society. In her article "The Rise and Fall of the Book of Joshua in Public Education in the Light of Ideological Changes in Israeli Society", Israeli biblical scholar Leah Mazor analyzes the history of the book and reveals a complex system of references to it expressed in a wide range of responses, often extreme, moving from narrow-minded admiration, through embarrassment and thunderous silence to a bitter and poignant critique. The changes in the status of the Book of Joshua, she shows, are the manifestations of the ongoing dialogue that Israeli society has with its cultural heritage, with its history, with the Zionist idea, and with the need to redefine its identity.

David Ben-Gurion saw in the war narrative of Joshua an ideal basis for a unifying national myth for the State of Israel, framed against a common enemy, the Arabs. He met with politicians and scholars such as Biblical scholar Shemaryahu Talmon to discuss Joshua's supposed conquests and later published a book of the meeting transcripts; in a lecture at Ben-Gurion's home, archaeologist Yigael Yadin argued for the historicity of the Israelite military campaign pointing to the conquests of Hazor, Bethel, and Lachish. Palestinian writer Nur Masalha claimed that Zionism had presented the 1948 Arab-Israeli War (which saw the creation of the State of Israel) as a "miraculous" clearing of the land based on Joshua, and the Bible as a mandate for the expulsion of the Palestinians.

The biblical narrative of conquest has been used as an apparatus of critique against Zionism. For example, Michael Prior criticizes the use of the campaign in Joshua to favor "colonial enterprises" (in general, not only Zionism), which have been interpreted as validating ethnic cleansing. He asserts that the Bible was used to make the mistreatment of Palestinians more morally palatable. A related moral condemnation can be seen in "The political sacralization of imperial genocide: contextualizing Timothy Dwight's The Conquest of Canaan" by Bill Templer. This kind of critique is not new; Jonathan Boyarin notes how Frederick W. Turner blamed Israel's monotheism for the very idea of genocide, which Boyarin found "simplistic" yet with precedents. In her tenure as Minister of Education, Israeli leftist politician Shulamit Aloni often complained about the centrality of the Book of Joshua in the curricula, as opposed to the secondaryness of humane and universal principles found in the Books of the Prophets. Her attempt to change the Bible study program was unsuccessful.

Harvard Bible professor and conservative Rabbi Shaye J. D. Cohen stated he is not happy with the genocide chapters being part of the Torah, and he would remove those from it, if it were his choice.

== See also ==
- The Bible Unearthed
- The Bible's Buried Secrets
- Ed (biblical reference)
- Late Bronze Age collapse
- Transjordan in the Bible
- Yom HaAliyah
- Mahabharata

== Bibliography ==
- Briggs, Peter sr. (2005). "Testing the Factuality of the Conquest of Ai Narrative in the Book of Joshua". In Carnagey, Glenn A.; Carnagey, Glenn jr.; Schoville, Keith N. (eds.). Beyond the Jordan: Studies in Honor of W. Harold Mare. Wipf & Stock. pp. 157–196. ISBN 978-1-59752-069-0.
- Bright, John (2000). A History of Israel (4th ed.). Westminster John Knox Press. ISBN 978-0-664-22068-6.
- Bruins, Hendrik J.; van der Plicht, Johannes (1995). "Tell Es-Sultan (Jericho): Radiocarbon Results..." (PDF). Radiocarbon. 37 (2): 213–220. doi:10.1017/S0033822200030666.
- Campbell, Anthony F (1994). "Martin Noth and the Deuteronomistic History". In McKenzie, Steven L.; Graham, Matt Patrick (eds.). The history of Israel's traditions: the heritage of Martin Noth. Sheffield Academic Press. ISBN 978-0-567-23035-5.
- ———; O'Brien, Mark (2000). Unfolding the Deuteronomistic history: origins, upgrades, present text. Fortress Press. ISBN 978-1-4514-1368-7.
- Day, John (2002). Yahweh and the Gods and Goddesses of Canaan. Sheffield Academic Press. ISBN 978-0-8264-6830-7.
- den Braber, Marieke; Wesselius, Jan-Wim (November 2008). "The Unity of Joshua 1–8, its Relation to the Story of King Keret, and the Literary Background to the Exodus and Conquest Stories". Scandinavian Journal of the Old Testament. 22 (2): 253–274. doi:10.1080/09018320802661218. S2CID 162220089.
- Farber, Zev (2016). Images of Joshua in the Bible and Their Reception. Walter de Gruyter. ISBN 978-3-11-038366-9.
- Goldingay, John (2023). Joshua. Baker Commentary on the Old Testament: Historical Books. Baker Books. ISBN 978-1-4934-4005-4.
- Gyémánt, Ladislau (2003). "Historiographic Views on the Settlement of the Jewish Tribes in Canaan". Sacra Scripta. I (1): 26–30. ISSN 1584-7624.
- Harstad, Adolph L. (2005). Joshua. Saint Louis, MO: Concordia Pub. House. ISBN 978-0-570-06319-3.
- Havrelock, Rachel (2013). "The Joshua Generation: Conquest and the Promised Land". Critical Research on Religion. 1 (3): 309. doi:10.1177/2050303213506473. S2CID 144093420.
- Hawk, L. Daniel (13 March 2012). "The Truth about Conquest: Joshua as History, Narrative, and Scripture". Interpretation: A Journal of Bible and Theology. 66 (2): 129–140. doi:10.1177/0020964311434872. S2CID 145540152.
- Hess, Richard S. (2008). "The Jericho and Ai of the Book of Joshua". In Hess, Richard S.; Klingbeil, Gerald A.; Ray, Paul J. Jr. (eds.). Critical issues in early Israelite history. Winona Lake, IN: Eisenbrauns. pp. 33–46. ISBN 978-1-57506-804-6.
- Jacobs, Paul F. (2000). "Jericho". In Freedman, David Noel; Myers, Allen C. (eds.). Eerdmans Dictionary of the Bible. Eerdmans. ISBN 978-90-5356-503-2.
- Japhet, Sara (1979). "Conquest and Settlement in Chronicles". Journal of Biblical Literature. 98 (2): 205–218. doi:10.2307/3265510. JSTOR 3265510.
- Killebrew, Ann E. (2020). "Early Israel's Origins, Settlement, and Ethnogenesis". In Kelle, Brad E.; Strawn, Brent A. (eds.). The Oxford Handbook of the Historical Books of the Hebrew Bible. Oxford University Press. ISBN 978-0-19-007411-1.
- Masalha, Nur (2014). The Zionist Bible: Biblical Precedent, Colonialism and the Erasure of Memory. Routledge. ISBN 978-1-317-54465-4.
- Mendenhall, George E. (1962). "The Hebrew Conquest of Palestine". The Biblical Archaeologist. 25 (3): 66–87. doi:10.2307/3210957. JSTOR 3210957. S2CID 165615750.
- Moore, Megan Bishop; Kelle, Brad E. (2011). Biblical History and Israel's Past. Eerdmans. ISBN 978-0-8028-6260-0.
- Nigro, Lorenzo (2020). "The Italian-Palestinian Expedition to Tell es-Sultan, Ancient Jericho (1997–2015)". In Sparks, Rachel T.; Finlayson, Bill; Wagemakers, Bart; Briffa SJ, Josef Mario (eds.). Digging Up Jericho: Past, Present and Future. Archaeopress Publishing Ltd. ISBN 978-1-78969-352-2.
- Paton, Lewis Bayles (1913). "Israel's Conquest of Canaan: Presidential Address at the Annual Meeting, Dec. 27, 1912". Journal of Biblical Literature. 32 (1): 1–53. doi:10.2307/3259319. JSTOR 3259319. S2CID 165671881.
- Pienaar, Daan (1 January 2004). "Some observations on conquest reports in the Book of Joshua". Journal of Northwest Semitic Languages. 30 (1). hdl:10520/EJC101285. ISSN 0259-0131.
- Prior, Michael (September 2002). "Ethnic Cleansing and the Bible: A Moral Critique". Holy Land Studies. 1 (1): 37–59. doi:10.3366/hls.2002.0003.
- Thompson, Leonard L. (1981). "The Jordan Crossing: ?idqot Yahweh and World Building". Journal of Biblical Literature. 100 (3): 343–58. doi:10.2307/3265959. JSTOR 3265959.
- Van Seters, John (January 1990). "Joshua's campaign of Canaan and near eastern historiography". Scandinavian Journal of the Old Testament. 4 (2): 1–12. doi:10.1080/09018329008584943.
- Van Seters, John (2000). "The Deuteronomist from Joshua to Samuel". In Knoppers, Gary N.; McConville, J. Gordon (eds.). Reconsidering Israel and Judah: Recent Studies on the Deuteronomistic History. Eisenbrauns. ISBN 978-1-57506-037-8.
- Wazana, Nili (2014). "Chapter 1: "Everything Was Fulfilled" versus "The Land That Yet Remains"". In Berthelot, Katell; David, Joseph E.; Hirshman, Marc (eds.). The gift of the land and the fate of the Canaanites in Jewish thought. Oxford University press. pp. 13–35. ISBN 978-0-19-995982-2.
- Wenham, Gordon J. (1971). "The Deuteronomic Theology of the Book of Joshua". Journal of Biblical Literature. 90 (2): 140–148. doi:10.2307/3263755. JSTOR 3263755. S2CID 17518822.
- Wood, W. Carleton (1916). "The Religion of Canaan: From the Earliest Times to the Hebrew Conquest (Concluded)". Journal of Biblical Literature. 35 (3/4): 163–279. doi:10.2307/3259942. JSTOR 3259942.
- Zevit, Ziony (1983). "Archaeological and Literary Stratigraphy in Joshua 7–8". Bulletin of the American Schools of Oriental Research. 251 (251): 23–35. doi:10.2307/1356824. JSTOR 1356824. S2CID 163691750.

Book of Joshua Prophets
Preceded by Deuteronomy	Hebrew Bible	Succeeded by Judges
Preceded by Deuteronomy	Christian; Old Testament	Succeeded by Judges
