= Ruth Amiran =

Israeli archaeologist

- רות עמירן
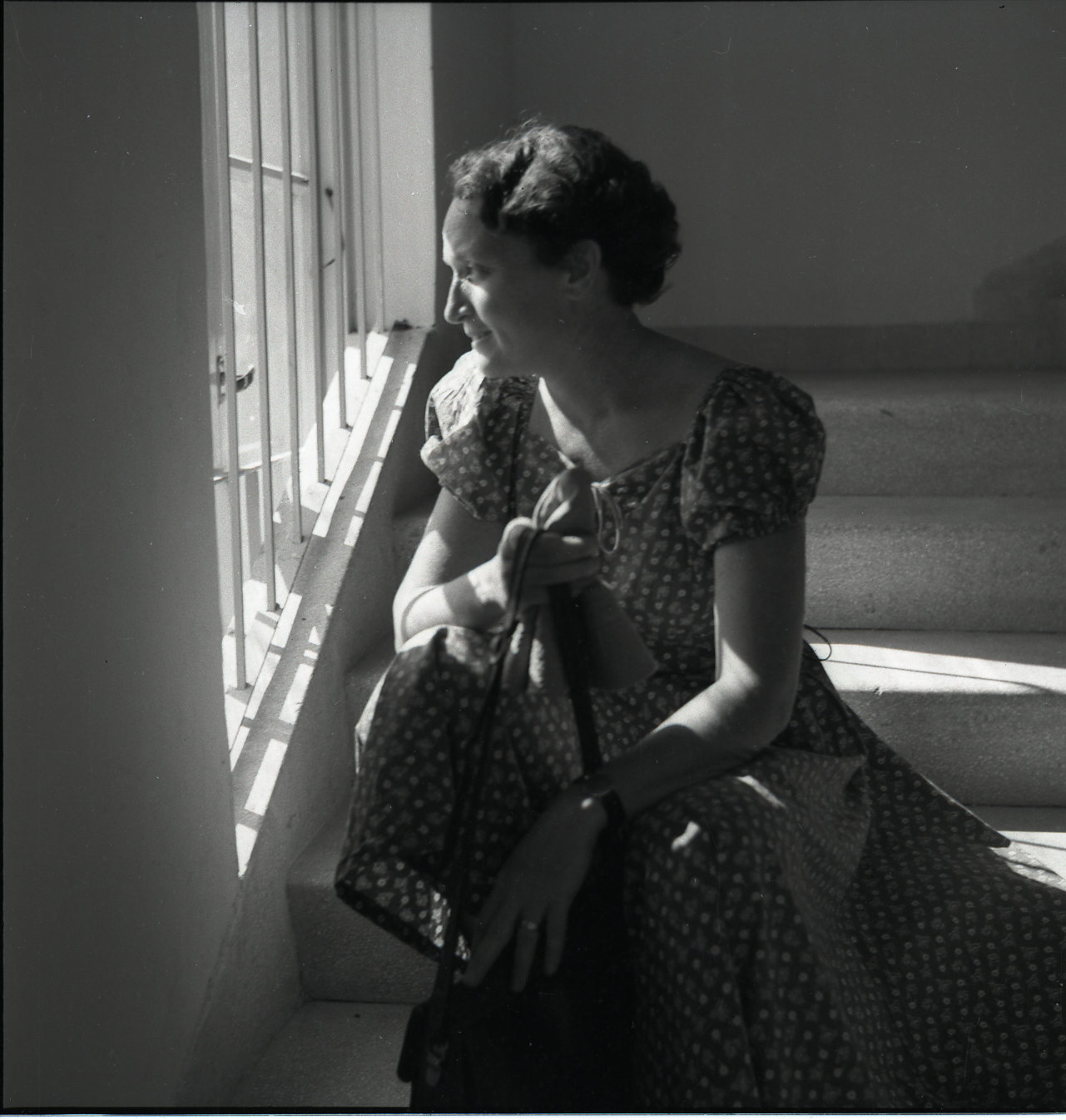
- Amiran in 1952
- Born: December 8, 1914; Yavne'el, Ottoman Empire
- Died: December 14, 2005 (aged 91); Jerusalem, Israel
- Resting place: Har HaMenuchot
- Occupation: Archaeologist
- Known for: Ancient Pottery of the Holy Land
- Awards: Israel Prize

Ruth Amiran (Hebrew: רות עמירן; née Brandstetter; December 8, 1914 – December 14, 2005) was an Israeli archaeologist whose 1970 book Ancient Pottery of the Holy Land: From Its Beginnings in the Neolithic Period to the End of the Iron Age is a standard reference for archaeologists working in Israel.

Ruth Amiran was born in the moshava Yavne'el in the Galilee area of the Ottoman Empire. In 1908 her father Yehezkel Brandshteter had immigrated from Tarnów in Poland (Galicia) to the area, where he married her mother Devora in 1913. She went to school in Haifa and in 1933 became a student of archeology at the Hebrew University in Jerusalem. While a student, Amiran excavated at a dig led by Judith Marquet-Krause at et-Tell.

== Awards ==
Amiran received the Israel Prize in 1982.

== See also ==
- List of Israel Prize recipients
