= Judith Marquet-Krause =

Israeli archaeologist (1906–1936)

- יהודית מרקה-קראוזה
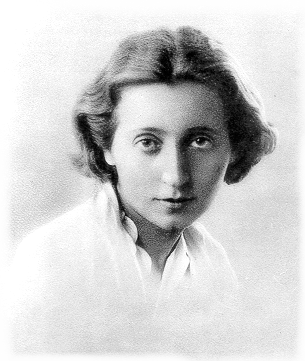
- Born: 1906; Ilaniya, Ottoman Empire
- Died: 1 July 1936 (aged 29–30)
- Resting place: Trumpeldor Cemetery
- Education: Sorbonne
- Occupation: Archaeologist
- Years active: 1932–1936
- Known for: Excavations at Ai

Judith Marquet-Krause (Hebrew: יהודית מַרקֶה -קרָאוּזֶה; 1906 – 1 July 1936) was an Israeli archaeologist, who was a pioneer in the archaeology of Israel and one of the first archaeologists born there. She led excavations at Et-Tell, where the Canaanite city of Ai was located.

== Early life and education ==
Judith Krause was born in 1906 in Ilaniya to a Jewish family. Her father, Eliyahu Krause (1876–1962), was an agronomist who worked for Baron Edmond James de Rothschild. In 1914 the family moved, when he became director of the Mikveh Israel agricultural school.

Krause then attended high school in Tel Aviv. She then moved to Paris to study French with the aim of graduating as a teacher. Whilst in Paris she also studied medieval history and literature at the Sorbonne. She also studied Akkadian, Syriac and Armenian at the École pratique des hautes études, as well as cuneiform at the École du Louvre. She was a pupil of René Dussaud. During this period she married Yves Marquet (1911-2008).

== Career ==
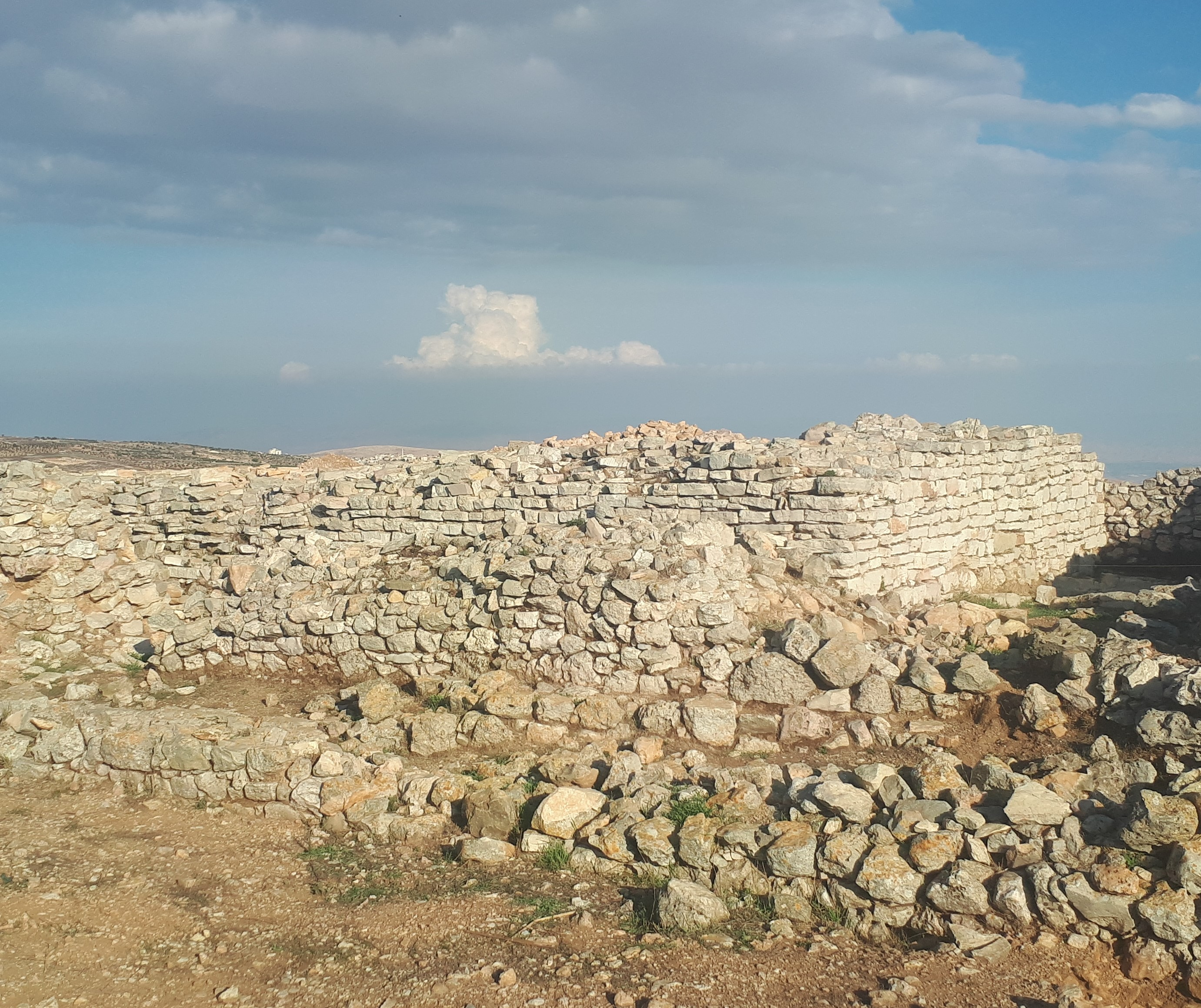
Et-Tell (Ai) ruins

Marquet-Krause joined John Garstang's excavation team at Jericho in 1932 or 1933, where she was in charge of the finds processing for graves. In 1933 she was appointed lead archaeologist at the Canaanite city of Ai, where she led excavations for three consecutive years between 1933 and 1935. The excavations were funded by Edmond Rothschild. The site had been first identified by WF Albright (1891–1971) at Et-Tell, about two kilometres southwest of Bethel. The purpose of Marquet-Krause's excavations was to confirm whether the description from the Book of Joshua, that Ai was a royal city in Canaan that was conquered along with Beth-el by the Israelites under Joshua, was true. In the first two seasons, the crew consisted of 80–100 people, one of whom was the archaeologist Ruth Amiran; for the 1935 season it expanded to 160 people.

The excavations showed that Ai was an important fortified city in the Early Bronze Age (3100-2400 BC), with a temple, in which pottery and Egyptian alabaster vessels were found, and tombs with other funerary finds. Excavations demonstrated that when the Bronze Age population left, the city was eradicated. On top of the remains of this earlier site, Marquet-Krause's team found the remains of a village, constructed without defences, that was built in 1220 BC, and inhabited until 1050 BC. It too was abandoned by the inhabitants, but not destroyed or conquered, thus demonstrating that the Book of Joshua's account was not historically accurate.

In 1936, finds from Ai were exhibited for a week at the Mikveh Israel Agricultural School. They were presented as archaeological evidence for the historicity of the Old Testament texts and were reported on by several newspapers.

Marquet-Krause died of tuberculosis on 1 July 1936.

== Historiography ==
Marquet-Krause published two preliminary accounts of her excavations. The final, yet incomplete, excavation report was issued by her husband after her death. From 1936 the excavations were taken over by Samuel Yevein. Her work was later re-visited by Baptist archaeologist Joseph Callaway, who excavated there between 1964 and 1972. He wanted to find evidence that the Book of Joshua was a true account, which would counter Marquet-Krause's findings; however he was forced to agree with the conclusions of her excavations. Although no full catalogue of her excavations at Ai is extant, it is known that finds were distributed among several museums in Israel, including the Rockefeller Museum.

Reassessment of her work in the late twentieth century, by Ziony Zevit and Beth Alpert Nakhai, of Marquet-Krause's identification of the temple at Ai supported her theory that it was a ritual space.

Marquet-Krause is considered a pioneer for women in biblical archaeology, and, had she lived, it is perhaps likely that she would have been one of Israel's foundational women archaeologists, along with Amiran and Olga Tufnell.

== Publications ==
- Les fouilles de 'Ay(et-Tell), 1933-1935 (Geuthner, 1949)
- "La deuxième campagne de fouilles à Ay (1934). Rapport sommaire." Syria (1935): 325–345.
