= Ai (Canaan) =

Canaanite city

Coordinates: 31°55′01″N 35°15′40″E

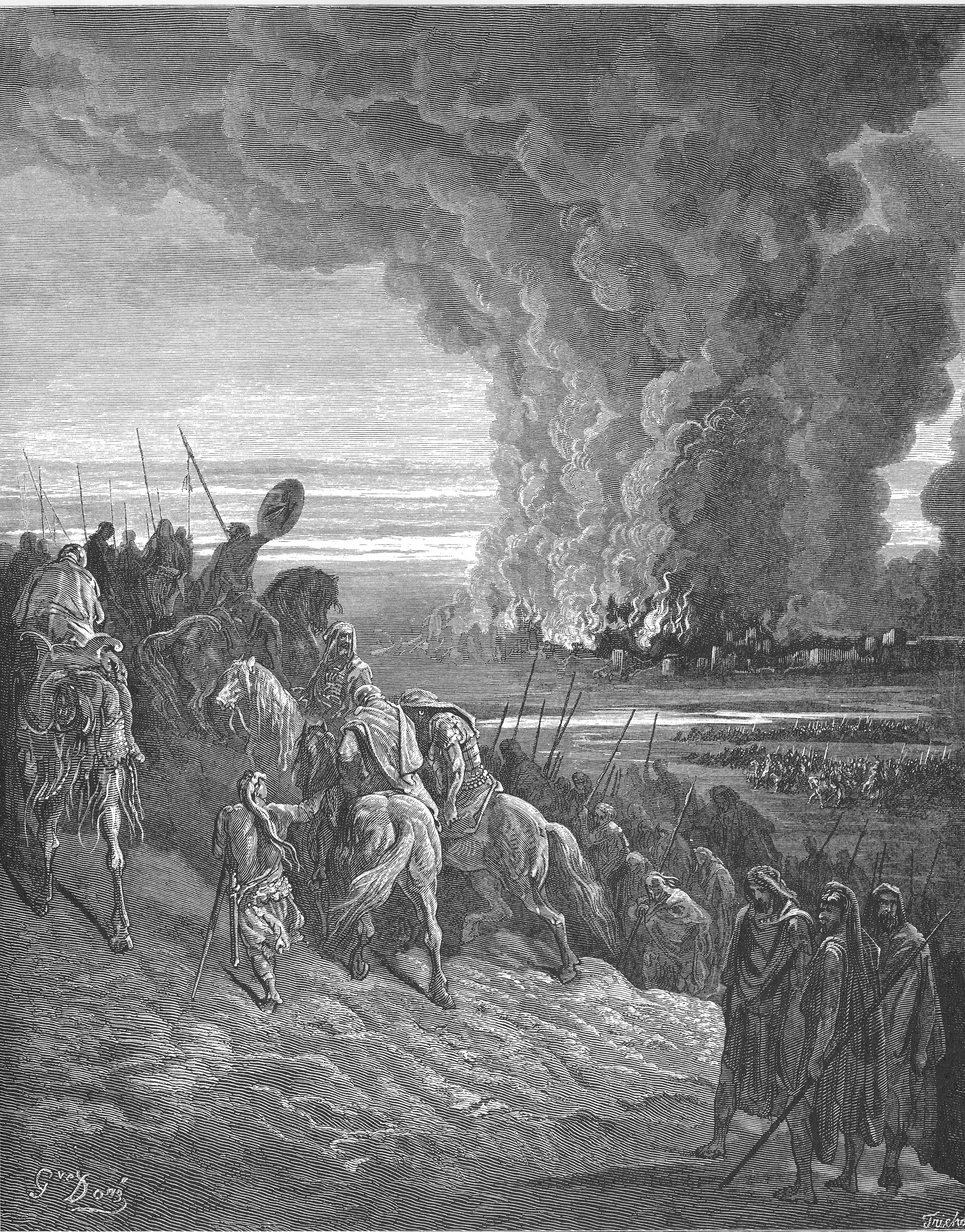
Gustave Doré, "Joshua Burns the Town of Ai" (1866); La Grande Bible de Tours.

The Ai (Hebrew: הָעַי, romanized: hāʿAy, lit. 'the heap (of ruins)'; Douay–Rheims: Hai) was a city in Canaan, mentioned in the Hebrew Bible. According to the Book of Joshua, it was conquered by the Israelites, headed by Joshua, during their conquest of Canaan.

Ai's ruins are commonly thought to be in the modern-day archeological site of Et-Tell. Excavations revealed a large urban settlement dating back to around 3100 BC, with cycles of destruction and rebuilding until roughly 2400 BC. It remained uninhabited until a small village emerged in the Early Iron Age. In light of those findings, scholars interpret the biblical account of Ai's conquest as an etiological myth explaining the origin of the place name.

== Biblical narrative ==
According to the Book of Genesis, Abraham built an altar between Bethel and Ai.

In the Book of Joshua, chapters 7 and 8, the Israelites attempt to conquer Ai on two occasions. The first, in Joshua 7, fails. The biblical account portrays the failure as being caused by a prior sin of Achan, for which he is stoned to death by the Israelites. On the second attempt, in Joshua 8, Joshua, who is identified by the narrative as the leader of the Israelites, receives instruction from God. God tells them to set up an ambush, and Joshua obeys. An ambush is arranged at the rear of the city on the western side. Joshua is with a group of soldiers that approach the city from the front and so the men of Ai, thinking that they will have another easy victory, chase Joshua and the fighting men from the entrance of the city to lead the men of Ai away from the city. Then, the fighting men to the rear enter the city and set it on fire.

When the city is captured, 12,000 men and women are killed, and it is razed to the ground. The king is captured and hanged on a tree until the evening. His body is then placed at the city gates and stones are placed on top of his body. The Israelites then burn Ai completely and "made it a permanent heap of ruins." God told them they could take the livestock as plunder, and so they did. Additionally, during the entire battle, Joshua held out toward Ai a javelin, and as a result, the Israelites achieved victory.

== Possible locations ==
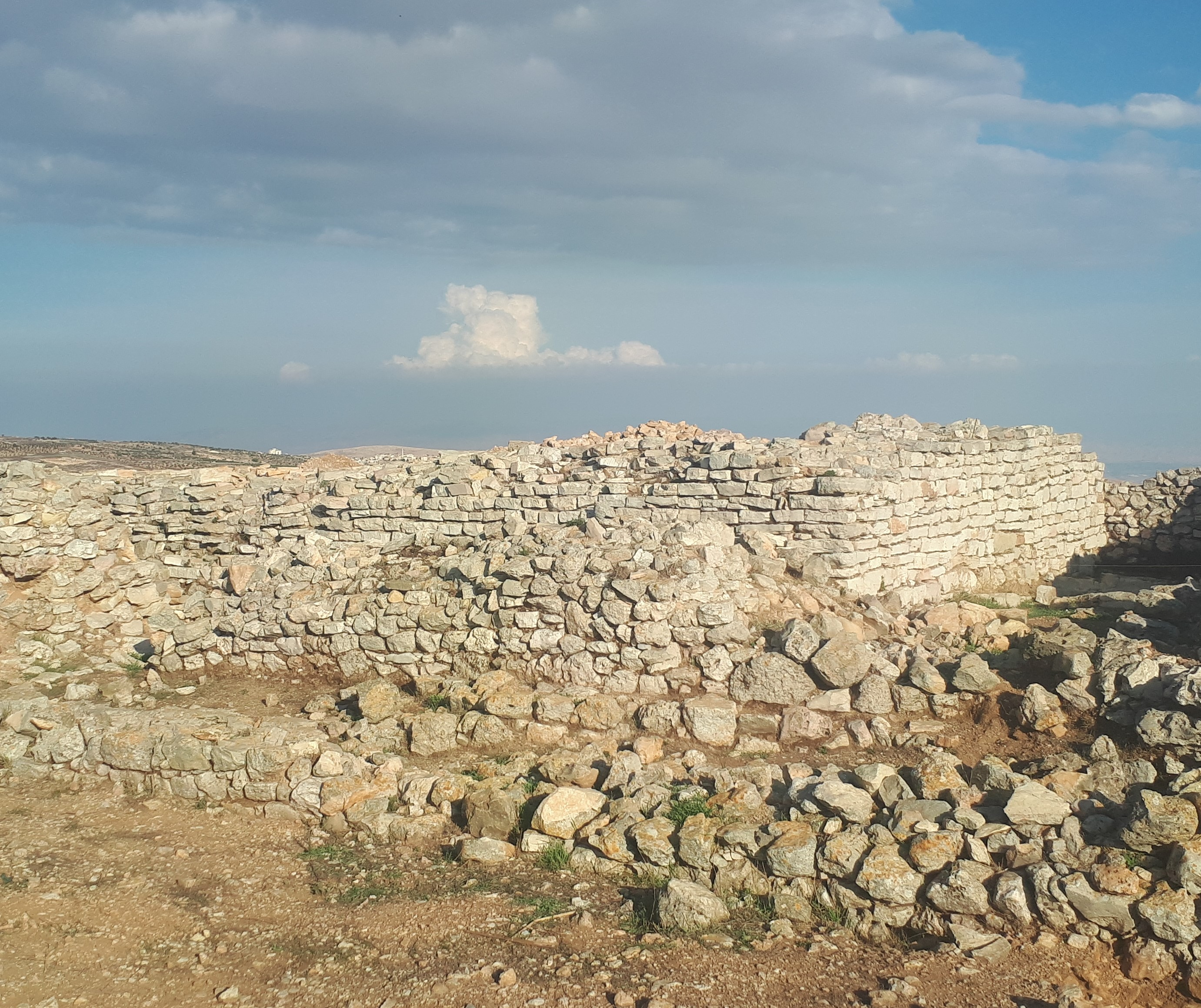
In the 19th century, Edward Robinson suggested that the ruins of Et-Tell in Palestine corresponded to the city of Ai.

=== Et-Tell ===
Edward Robinson (1794–1863), who identified many biblical sites in the Levant on the basis of local place names and basic topography, suggested that Et-Tell or Khirbet Haijah were likely on philological grounds; he preferred the former as there were visible ruins at that site. A further point in its favour is the fact that the Hebrew name Ai means more or less the same as the modern Arabic name et-Tell.

Until the 1920s, a "positivist" reading of the archeology to date was prevalent, a belief that archeology would prove, and was proving, the historicity of the Exodus and Conquest narratives that dated the Exodus in 1440 BC and Joshua's conquest of Canaan around 1400 BC. And accordingly, on the basis of excavations in the 1920s the American scholar William Foxwell Albright believed that Et-Tell was Ai.

However, excavations at Et-Tell in the 1930s, undertaken by Judith Marquet-Krause, found that there was a fortified city there during the Early Bronze Age, between 3100 and 2400 BC, after which it was destroyed and abandoned. The excavations found no evidence of settlement in the Middle or Late Bronze Ages. Those findings, along with excavations at Bethel, posed problems for the dating that Albright and others had proposed, and some scholars, including Martin Noth, began proposing that the Conquest had never happened but instead was an etiological myth; the name meant "the ruin" and that the Conquest story simply explained the already-ancient destruction of the Early Bronze city. Archeologists also found that the later Iron Age I village appeared with no evidence of initial conquest and that the Iron Age I settlers seem to have peacefully built their village on the forsaken mound without meeting resistance.

Five main hypotheses exist about how to explain the biblical story surrounding Ai in light of archaeological evidence. The first is that the story was created later, when Israelites related it to Joshua because of the fame of his great conquest. The second is that people of Bethel inhabited Ai during the time of the biblical story and were the ones who were invaded. In a third, Albright combined both theories to present a hypothesis that the story of the Conquest of Bethel, which was only a mile and a half away from Ai, was later transferred to Ai to explain the reasons for the city's existence and being ruins. Support for this position can be found in the Bible, the assumption being that the Bible does not mention the actual capture of Bethel but might speak of it in memory in Judges 1:22–26. A fourth, by Joseph Callaway, proposed that the city somehow angered the Egyptians (perhaps by rebelling and attempting to gain independence) and so they destroyed it as punishment. The fifth is that Joshua's Ai is not to be found at et-Tell but a different location entirely.

Koert van Bekkum wrote, "Et-Tell, identified by most scholars with the city of Ai, was not settled between the Early Bronze and Iron Age I."

== See also ==
- Battle of Jericho
- Tel Hazor
- Battle of Gibeah for similar tactics
- Archaeology of Israel
