= Et-Tell =

Archaeological site in Palestine

et-Tell
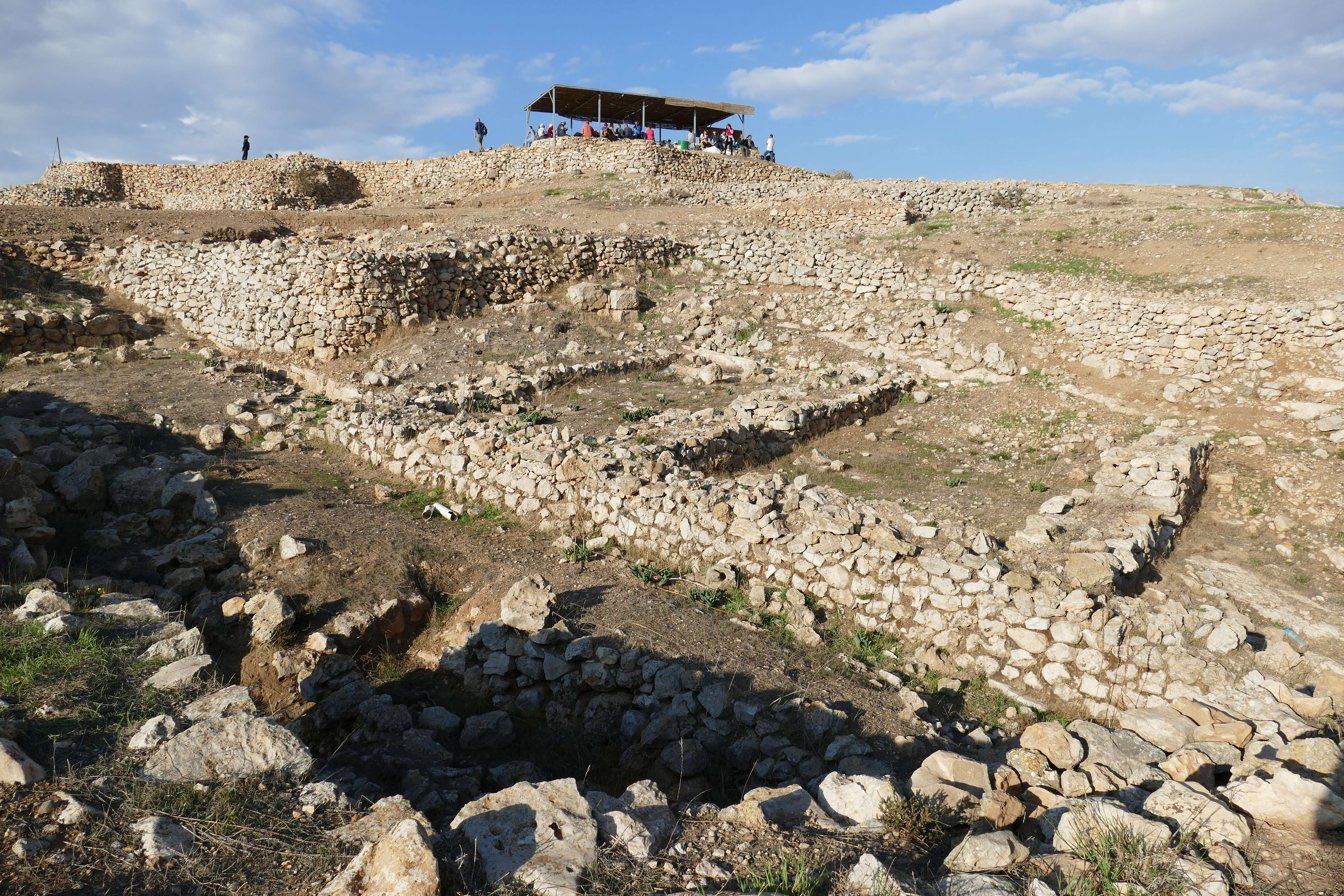

- Location within State of Palestine
- 31.9165°N 35.2615°E
- Location: Ramallah and al-Bireh Governorate, West Bank, Palestine

Site notes
- Excavation dates: 1928, 1933–35, 1964–70, 2005–07
- Archaeologists: John Garstang; Judith Marquet-Krause; Joseph Callaway; Hani Nur el-Din

Et-Tell (Arabic: التل, lit. 'the ruin-heap') or Khirbet et-Tell (also meaning "heap of ruins") is an archaeological site in the West Bank in Palestine. The site is commonly identified with the biblical city of Ai.

== Location ==
The site of et-Tell is just beside the modern village of Deir Dibwan and about 3 km east of Beitin (ancient Bethel), atop a watershed plateau overlooking the Jordan Valley and the city of Jericho 14 km east.

== Settlement phases ==
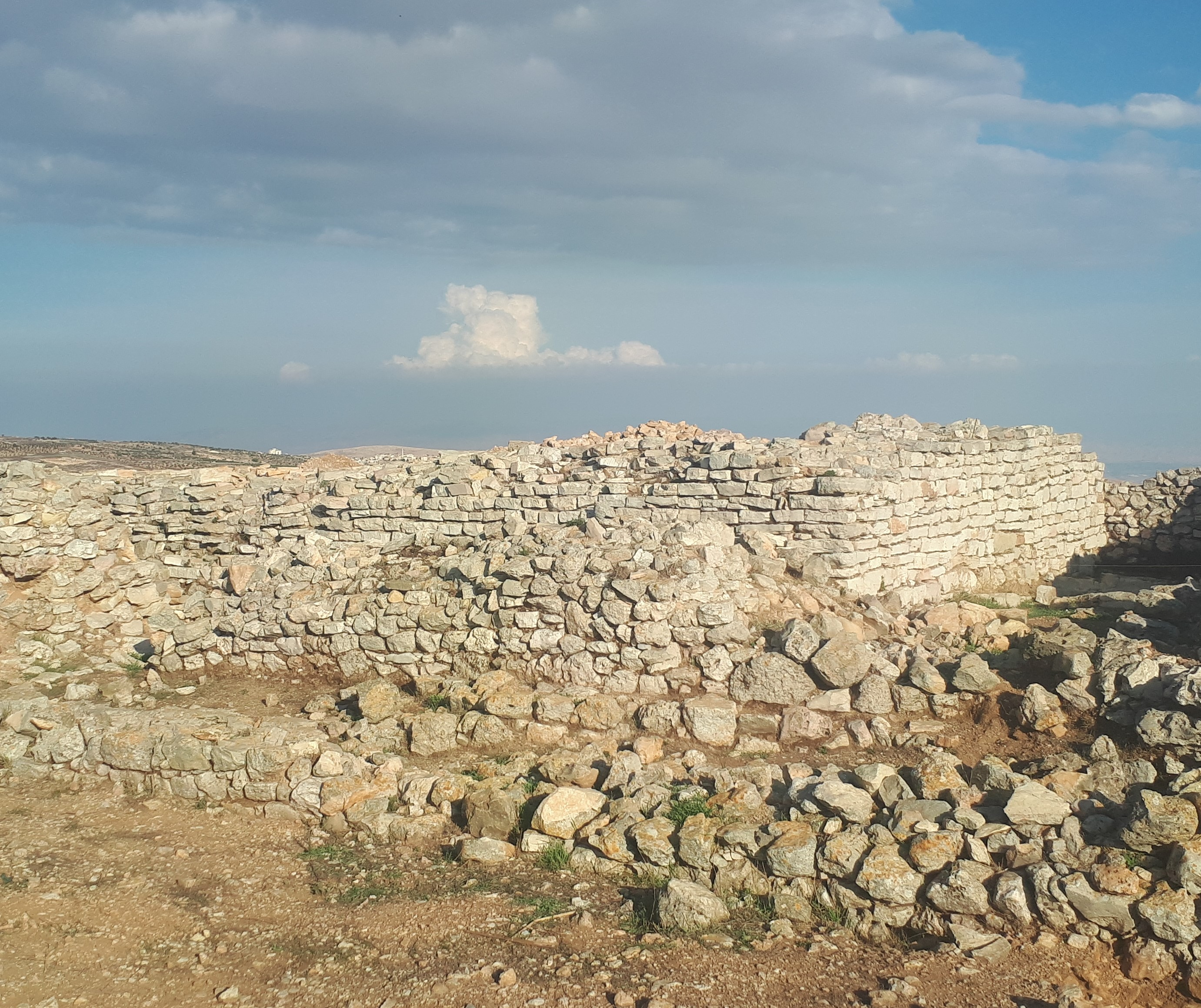
Et-Tell ruins

=== Early Bronze I ===
The earliest settlement phase known at et-Tell, called "Pre-Urban", coincides with the Early Bronze Age I (EBI) and lasted from about 3200 to 3100 BC. In this period, an unfortified village (about 200 m in diameter, large for the EBI) was settled at the site, with accompanying tombs dug in caves on the northeastern slopes of the hill. Pottery styles from this period show both indigenous and foreign cultural influences and may signify a mingling of peoples from nearby areas and newcomers immigrating from more distant regions. Over time, the foreign elements tended to predominate over indigenous ones.

About 3100 BC, et-Tell entered the "Urban A" phase. A large, well-planned walled city, about 110,000 square metres (~11 ha) in area, was built on the site. Some notable buildings from this time include a great acropolis complex consisting of a temple-palace compound, a market and residential area, and four fortified city gates. Sometime between 2950 and 2860 BC, the Urban A city was brought to an end by violent destruction. Most of the main buildings were burned to the ground; a layer of scorched stones and ash covers the floors of the EBI buildings.

=== Early Bronze II (2950/2860–2720 BC) ===
Following this destruction, the city was rebuilt and entered into the "Urban B" phase, which coincides with the Early Bronze II (EBII) period. Buildings were repaired and modified, and the fortifications were strengthened. Two distinctive new pottery shapes that first appear in this period suggest that new leadership was imposed on the city; these newcomers may also have been responsible for the destruction of the Urban A/EBI settlement.

The Urban B city, like its forerunner, was destroyed violently by fire. Excavations uncovered the ruins of buildings, collapsed stones and beams at every site investigated. Fire trapped under the debris of collapsed roofs smoldered hotly enough to change the chemical composition of the stone, a process called calcination. The walls of the compound on the acropolis were tilted and displaced by a rift in the bedrock, suggesting that an earthquake may have been responsible for the destruction. This happened around 2720 BC, based on carbon-14 dating.

=== Transitional EB II–III Hiatus (c. 2720–2700/2680 BC) ===
Following this destruction, the city lay in ruins for some time. Erosion channels cut through the debris; based on their depth and spread, the city was most likely abandoned for between 20 and 40 years.

=== Early Bronze III ===
Finally, in the Early Bronze Age III (EBIII), et-Tell was rebuilt and entered the "Urban C" phase. Egyptian influence in this stage is evident, attested by the use of stone pillars shaped with copper saws as well as other typically Egyptian building techniques. Two gates in the city wall, along with a great open reservoir designed to capture rainwater, are known.

Around 2550 BC, there was a temporary disruption at the site, based on damage and rebuilding to the fortifications and major changes in the temple area. Finally, about 2400 BC, complete destruction again overtook the site. Callaway has proposed that a local Canaanite ruler may have managed to conquer the city away from the Egyptians, following which it was destroyed in an Egyptian counterattack.

=== Hiatus (2400–1200 BC) ===
After the destruction of the "Urban C" layer, et-Tell was abandoned and lay in ruins for over a thousand years.

=== Iron Age I ===
The next settlement period did not begin until the Iron Age I, about 1200 BC, when a wave of settlers came and peacefully began a new occupation there. This new village was unfortified and took up only a small region of the mound, smaller by far than the Early Bronze cities. This level is marked by the digging of rock-cut cisterns into the hill to catch rainwater and the use of terrace farming on the slopes of the mound. The discovery of farming tools and great quantities of animal bones in every house suggests that these people were both farmers and shepherds. About 1050 BC, this village was abandoned without burning or destruction.

== Excavation history ==
The first archaeological exploration of et-Tell was undertaken in September 1928 under the supervision of John Garstang. Eight trenches were dug, five against the outer side of the southern city wall and three within the city itself. The outcome of this excavation was never formally published, and the only report known is a three-page summary filed by Garstang at the end of the work. In a later book, Garstang claimed that Late Bronze Age pottery, dating to c. 1400 BC, was found in this excavation, but this pottery was not mentioned in his earlier summary of the work and cannot now be located.

The next excavation at et-Tell took place during three seasons between 1933 and 1935 and was led by Judith Marquet-Krause, with backing from Baron Edmond de Rothschild. A fourth season of excavation was cut short by Marquet-Krause's untimely death in July 1936; however, her husband compiled a catalog of objects found in the excavation and published it in 1949. This campaign concentrated on the upper region of the mound and exposed regions of the acropolis and a village dating to the Iron Age.

The most recent campaign at et-Tell, the Joint Archaeological Expedition, was undertaken in nine seasons from 1964 to 1970 and overseen by Joseph Callaway and the American Schools of Oriental Research. Eight new sites were opened at et-Tell in areas next to Marquet-Krause's expedition and along the lower east city walls, and three smaller sites in the neighborhood were surveyed to create a more whole archaeological profile of the region.

A more recent expedition led by Hani Nur el-Din of Al-Quds University surveyed the site in 2003 and conducted excavations focusing on the eastern limit of the tell in 2005 and 2007.

== Comparisons with biblical Ai ==
Edward Robinson suggested in 1838 that et-Tell could be the location of the biblical city of Ai, as did Charles Wilson in 1866, on the evidence of biblical references and nearby topography. This identification was backed by the American scholar William Foxwell Albright, who further argued in a 1924 paper that the site of et-Tell held the ruins of a great Canaanite city, corresponding with the biblical tradition that the Israelite commander Joshua "burnt Ai and made it a heap for ever" (Joshua 8:28). Another point in favor of this hypothesis is that the Hebrew word "Ai" means "the ruin", which is more or less the same meaning as the modern Arabic name, et-Tell. Albright's identification has been accepted by the majority of the archaeological community, and today et-Tell is widely believed to be one and the same as the Biblical Ai.

If et-Tell is indeed Ai, this poses a problem for defenders of the literal historicity of the biblical accounts concerning the origin of ancient Israel. The reason for this is that traditional dating schemes place the Exodus from Egypt and Joshua's conquest around 1400 BC. In this version of events, Joshua and the invading Israelites are depicted as conquering Ai, killing its residents and burning the city; however, et-Tell was unoccupied at this time according to the established archaeological chronology, and the later Iron Age I village appeared with no evidence of initial conquest. The Iron I settlers seem to have peacefully built their village on the forsaken mound, without meeting resistance.

One proposal to resolve this difficulty holds that the Bible's description of Ai, whose Hebrew name הָעַי means "the ruin", seems to imply that it was indeed a ruined settlement at the time of the Israelite conquest. Ralph K. Hawkins has proposed that Ai was destroyed by Joshua in a scaled-down attack against the Caananite people who were living in the ruins of the previous Middle Bronze Age city.

== Bibliography ==
- Wagemakers, Bart (2014). "Khirbet Et-Tell (Ai?)". Archaeology in the 'Land of Tells and Ruins': A History of Excavations in the Holy Land Inspired by the Photographs and Accounts of Leo Boer. Oxbow Books. ISBN 978-1-782-97245-7.
