= Veliko Tarnovo =

City in north central Bulgaria

Veliko Tarnovo Велико Търново
- Town
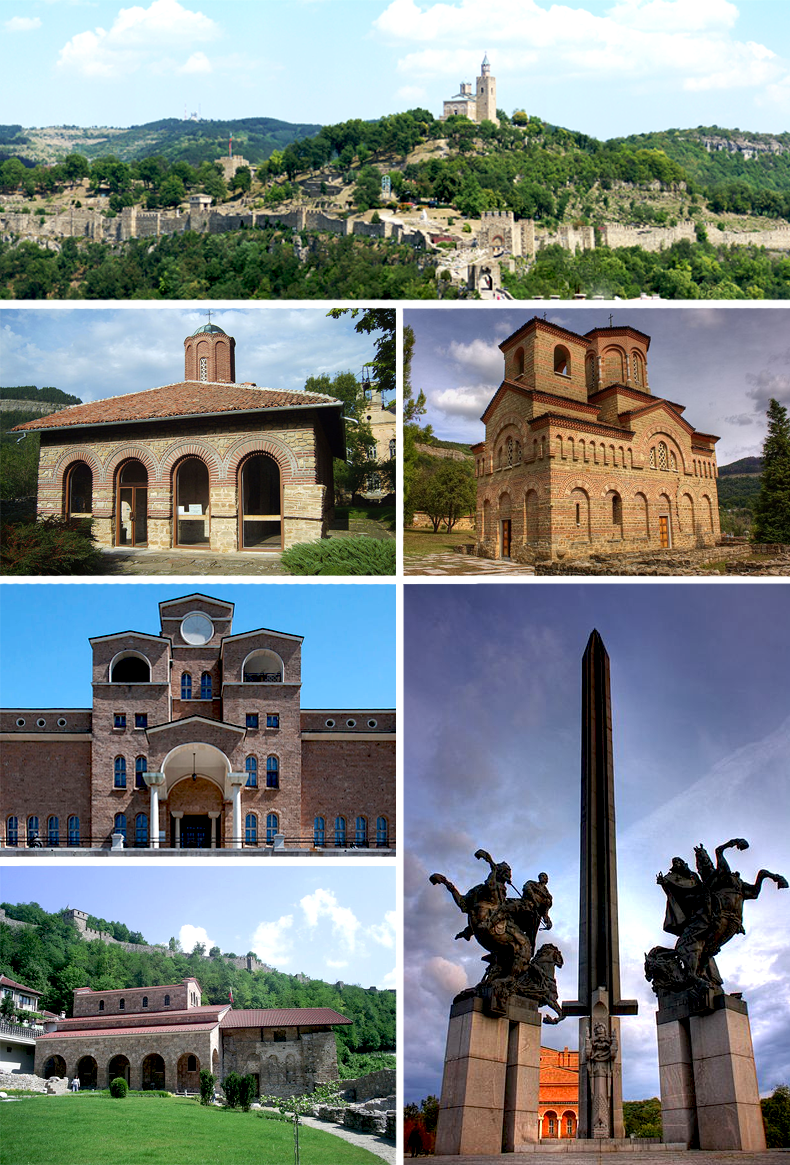

- Flag Coat of arms

- Location of Veliko Tarnovo
- Coordinates: 43°04′40″N 25°37′00″E
- Country: Bulgaria
- Province: Veliko Tarnovo

Government
  - Mayor: Daniel Panov (GERB)

Area
  - Town: 30.379 km^{2} (11.729 sq mi)
  - Urban: 885.3 km^{2} (341.8 sq mi)
- Elevation: 220 m (720 ft)

Population (2022)
  - Town: 59,166
  - Urban: 76,834
- Demonym: Tarnovets/Tarnovka Bolyarin/Bolyarka
- Time zone: UTC+02:00 (EET)
  - Summer (DST): UTC+03:00 (EEST)
- Postal code: 5000
- Area code: 062
- Website: veliko-tarnovo.bg/bg/

Veliko Tarnovo (Bulgarian: Велико Търново, romanized: Veliko Tǎrnovo, pronounced [vɛˈliko ˈtɤrnovo]; lit. 'Great Tarnovo') is a city in north central Bulgaria and the administrative centre of Veliko Tarnovo Province. It is the historical and spiritual capital of Bulgaria.

Often referred to as the "City of the Tsars", Veliko Tarnovo is located on the Yantra River and is famously known as the historical capital of the Second Bulgarian Empire, attracting many tourists with its unique architecture. The old part of the town is situated on three hills, Tsarevets, Trapezitsa, and Sveta Gora, rising amidst the meanders of the Yantra. On Tsarevets are the palaces of the Bulgarian emperors and the Patriarchate, the Patriarchal Cathedral, and also a number of administrative and residential edifices surrounded by thick walls.

Trapezitsa is known for its many churches and as the former main residence of the nobility. During the Middle Ages, the town was among the main European centres of culture and gave its name to the architecture of the Tarnovo Artistic School, painting of the Tarnovo Artistic School, and to literature. Veliko Tarnovo is an important administrative, economic, educational, and cultural centre of Northern Bulgaria.

== Etymology ==
The most widespread theory for the name's origin holds that its original names of Tarnovgrad (Търновград) and Tarnovo (Търново) come from the Old Bulgarian тръневъ (tranev) or тръновъ (tranov), meaning "thorny". The suffix "grad" means "city" in Bulgarian and in many Slavic languages. In 1965, the word велико (veliko), meaning "great", was added to the original name in honour of the town's status as an old capital of Bulgaria. This also helps distinguish it from the town of Malko Tarnovo. In Ottoman Turkish, it was called طرنوه (Modern Turkish: Tırnova).

== Symbols ==
The anthem of the city is Shishman's song, dedicated to the last Bulgarian king of the Second Bulgarian Kingdom. The coat of arms of Tarnovo depicts a figure with three lions. Purple color was used for the flag of the city, because during the excavations in the church St. Forty Martyrs, purple clothes of rulers were found. There is also a key and a necklace of Veliko Tarnovo. The first known coat of arms of the city is from 1921 by Dimitar Bagrilov.

== Geography ==
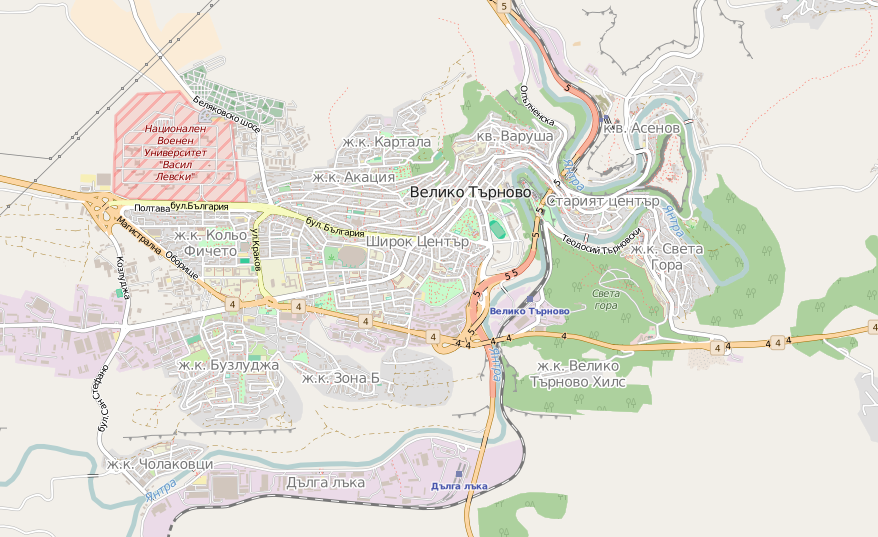
Map of the city

=== Location ===
Veliko Tarnovo has an area of 60.9 square kilometres (23.5 sq mi). The area which is assigned to the town is 30.379 square kilometres (11.729 sq mi). It is located on the river Yantra. The town has always had a strategic position. It is located on main roads which connect West Balkans with Black Sea and East Europe with Middle East. In the East and North-East the town borders with the Arbanassi Bardo. North – with the Orlovets locality, to the west with the Kozludzha locality and to the south with the area Dalga laka.

=== Relief ===
The relief of the Municipality of Veliko Tarnovo is diverse – plain-hilly and mountainous. It is situated at 208 metres (682 ft) above sea level.

=== Hydrography ===
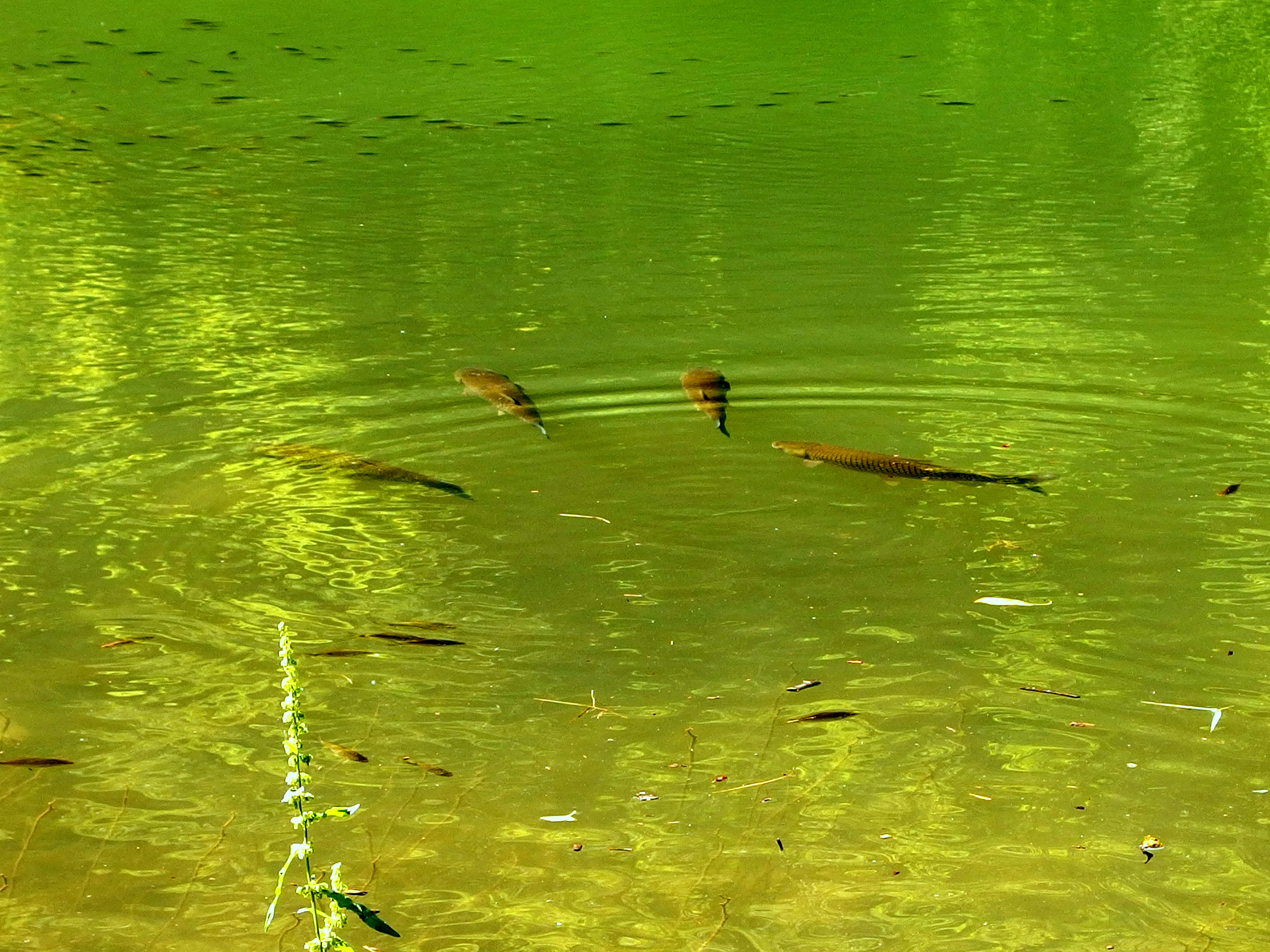
Between Arbanasi and Veliko Tarnovo in June 2014.

The water catchment area of the river Yantra is 7,862 square kilometres (3,036 sq mi). There are several springs in the area of the town. The main drinking source is the Yovkovtsi hydropower plant.

=== Soils ===
The southern part of the city predominately features chernozem and gray forest soils. Repellents are also distributed – hummus-carbonate soils.

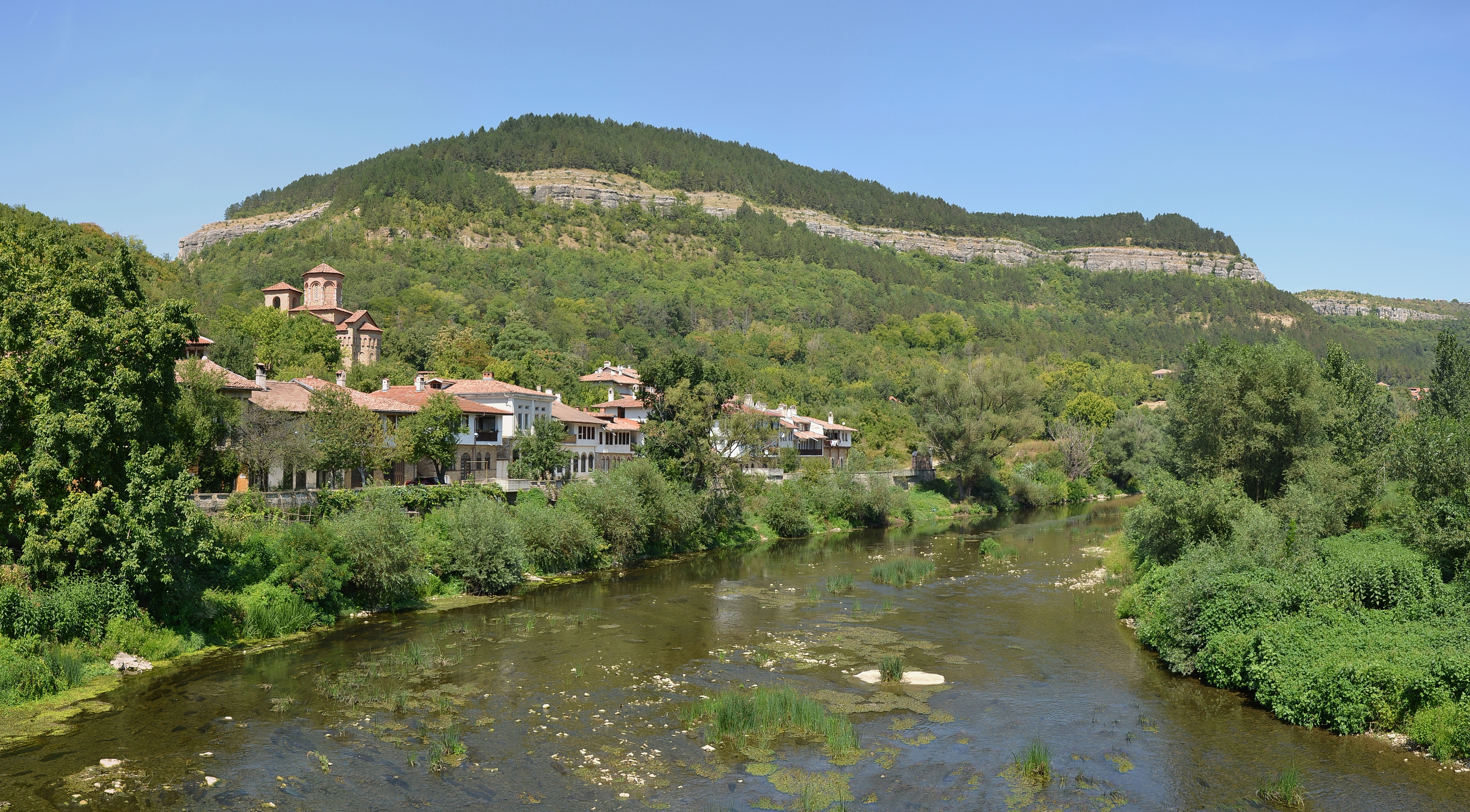
Yantra valley

=== Area ===
There are places around the town that keep their names for many years. Sini Vir is located to the west of the Cholakovtsi neighborhood in the Yantra River valley outside the town. Dervent is located in the Yantra River Gorge, near the Preobrazhenie Monastery. The Hill Golemyat duvar(Big Fort) with the highest peak 363 m. It is located between Veliko Tarnovo and the village Prisovo.

==== Hills ====
Veliko Tarnovo is situated on several hills. The Tsarevets, Trapezitsa, Momina krepost were the main centers of kings and boyars during the Second Bulgarian State, when the town was a capital. Sveta Gora (Holy Mountain) hill was a spiritual and literary center, and part of the today's Rectorate of Veliko Tarnovo University. The Garga Bair hill lies north of Trapezitsa. On the Orlovets hill are the Varusha neighborhood and the Akatsion and Kartala districts, the highest point is 241 metres (791 ft) above sea level. The Troshana Hill is located south of Sveta Gora and west of the Motela dam, and Veliko Tarnovo Hills is being built on it.

==== Caves ====
There are about 50 caves and rock niches around Veliko Tarnovo. They are formed in limestones from the Jurassic and Cretaceous periods. They are located mainly around the Arbanassi hill and the rock crown in the Dervent gorge.

=== Climate ===
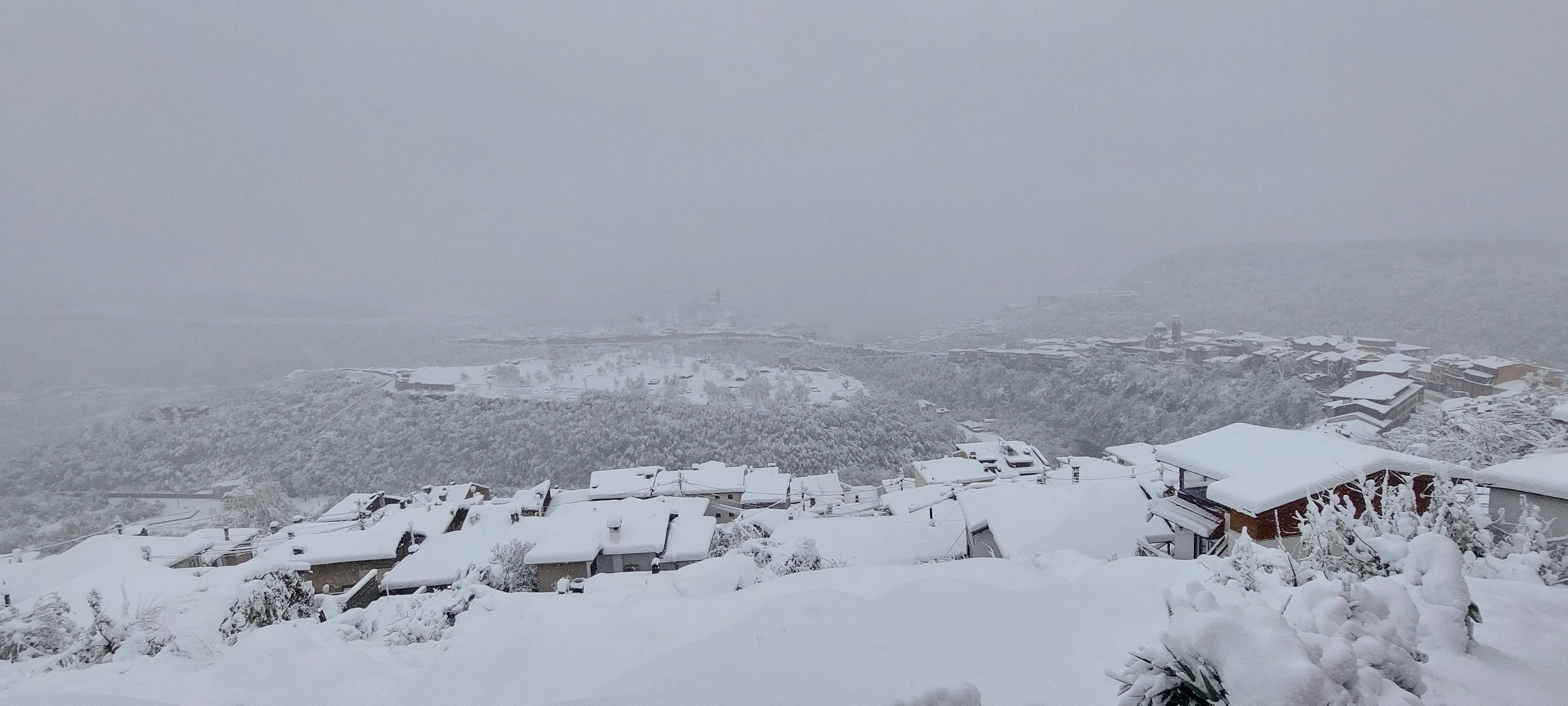
Winter in Veliko Tarnovo

Veliko Tarnovo has a humid continental climate (Dfa), according to the Köppen climate classification, experiencing warm summers and cold, snowy winters. The average minimum temperature in the coldest month, January, is about −7 °C (19 °F), while the average maximum in August, the hottest month 30 °C (86 °F). The highest recorded temperature was 41.1 °C (106 °F), while the lowest was −28.1 °C (−19 °F).

Climate data for Veliko Tarnovo, Bulgaria (1961–1990, records 1926–1970)
Month	Jan	Feb	Mar	Apr	May	Jun	Jul	Aug	Sep	Oct	Nov	Dec	Year
Record high °C (°F)	20.4 (68.7)	23.3 (73.9)	29.7 (85.5)	32.2 (90.0)	36.1 (97.0)	38.4 (101.1)	40.0 (104.0)	41.1 (106.0)	40.6 (105.1)	33.8 (92.8)	29.8 (85.6)	21.8 (71.2)	41.1 (106.0)
Mean daily maximum °C (°F)	2.1 (35.8)	5.7 (42.3)	11.4 (52.5)	18.6 (65.5)	23.4 (74.1)	27.0 (80.6)	29.6 (85.3)	29.8 (85.6)	26.0 (78.8)	19.4 (66.9)	12.4 (54.3)	5.1 (41.2)	17.8 (64.0)
Daily mean °C (°F)	−2.3 (27.9)	0.7 (33.3)	5.5 (41.9)	12.1 (53.8)	17.2 (63.0)	20.7 (69.3)	22.9 (73.2)	22.4 (72.3)	18.1 (64.6)	12.4 (54.3)	6.9 (44.4)	0.9 (33.6)	11.6 (52.9)
Mean daily minimum °C (°F)	−6.8 (19.8)	−4.3 (24.3)	−0.2 (31.6)	5.3 (41.5)	10.0 (50.0)	13.5 (56.3)	15.2 (59.4)	14.5 (58.1)	10.7 (51.3)	6.1 (43.0)	2.4 (36.3)	−3.1 (26.4)	5.0 (41.0)
Record low °C (°F)	−20.8 (−5.4)	−28.1 (−18.6)	−16.7 (1.9)	−2.5 (27.5)	2.0 (35.6)	5.3 (41.5)	9.8 (49.6)	9.2 (48.6)	−0.8 (30.6)	−2.6 (27.3)	−9.8 (14.4)	−18.4 (−1.1)	−28.1 (−18.6)
Average precipitation mm (inches)	48 (1.9)	44 (1.7)	43 (1.7)	63 (2.5)	88 (3.5)	86 (3.4)	65 (2.6)	56 (2.2)	41 (1.6)	45 (1.8)	51 (2.0)	50 (2.0)	680 (26.8)
Source: Stringmeteo.com

=== Flora and fauna ===
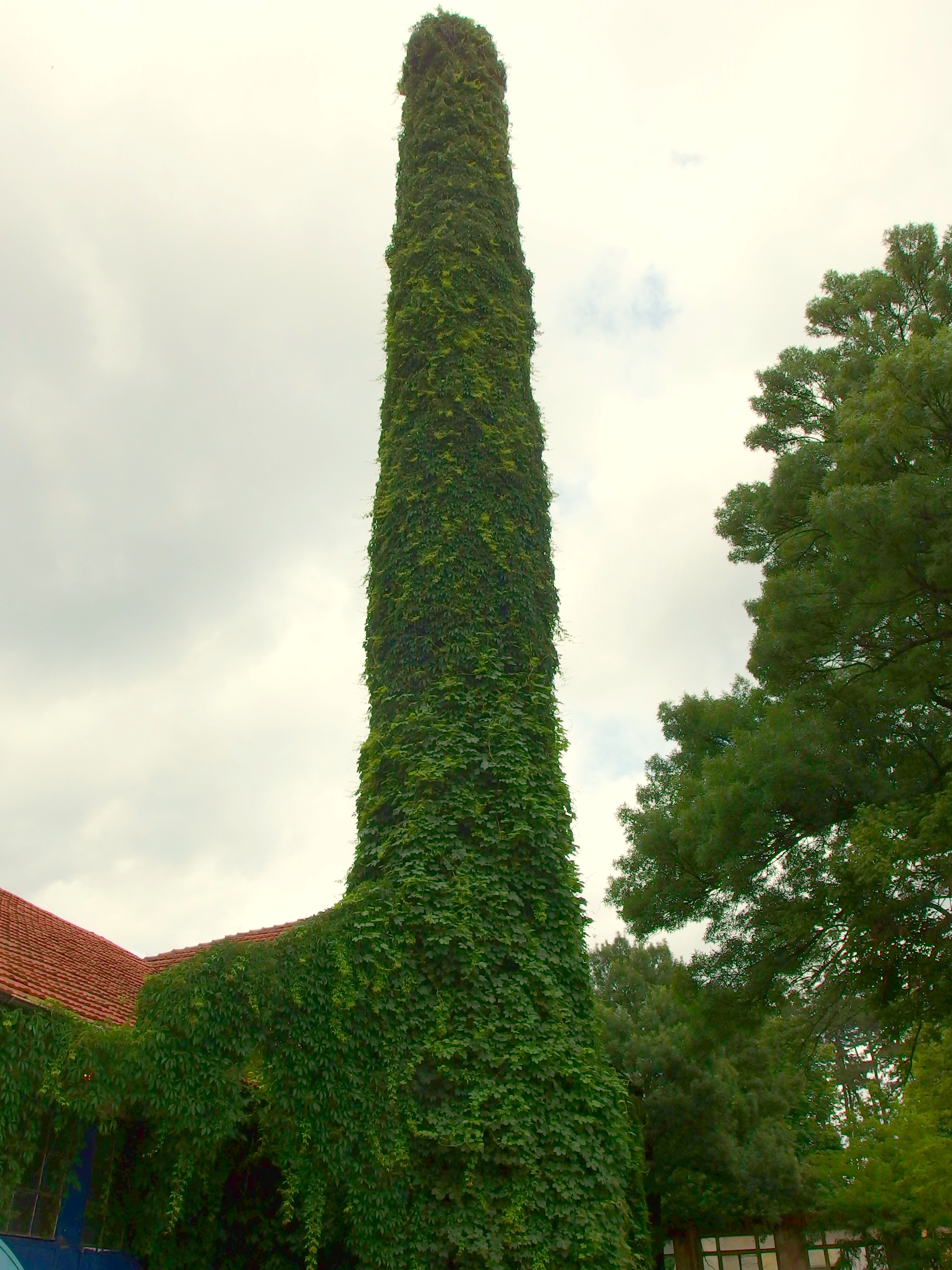
Trees and climbing ivy in Veliko Tarnovo

==== Flora ====
The deciduous forests (88%) predominate in Veliko Tarnovo – beech, hornbeam, oak, cherry, lime, poplar, etc. There are woods of coniferous vegetation. They predominate fir tree, Pine, Abies grandis, Scots pine, Abies pinsapo and other. Near the river, the springs and the marshlands are seen: Green algae, Diatom and others. Over 25 types of mushrooms are encountered: Boletus edulis, Agaricus campestris, Macrolepiota procera, Chanterelle, among others.

==== Fauna ====
The territory of the region has a rich variety of the animal world – 350 species of birds and 35 species of animals. Mammals include Hare, Fox, Deer, Wild boar, Hedgehogs, European ground squirrel. Birds include: Grey partridge, Crow, Common quail, Pheasant, White stork, Eurasian eagle-owl, Goose and others. Over 180 species of insects are encountered: Cockchafer, Grasshopper, Firefly and others. There are also reptiles: Turtles, Snakes, Lizards and others. Local fish include Wels catfish, European perch, Common carp, Common barbel.

== History ==
=== Prehistory and antiquity ===
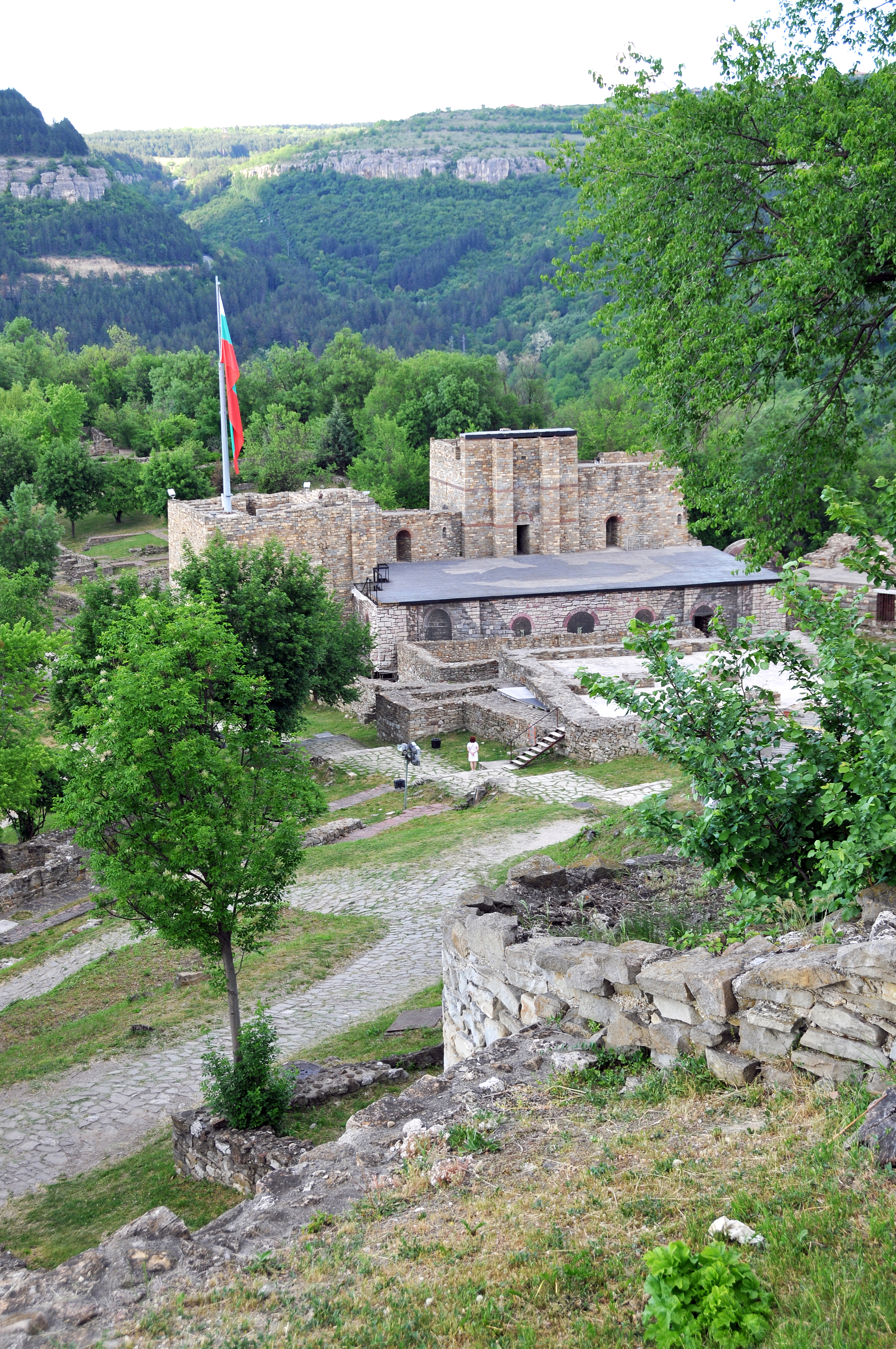
Tsarevets palace

Map of medieval Tarnovo

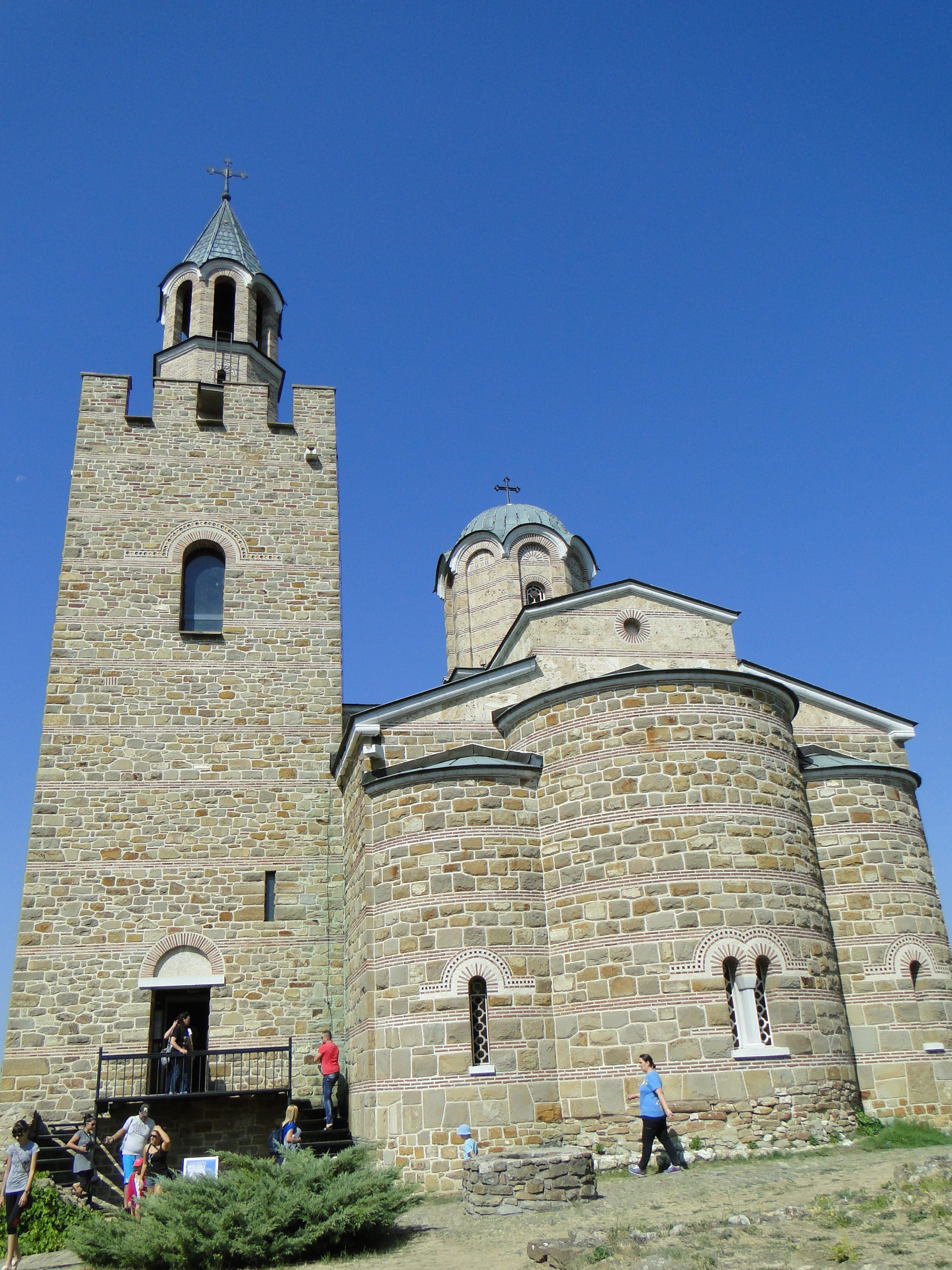
Patriarchal Cathedral

Veliko Tarnovo is one of the oldest settlements in Bulgaria, with a history of more than five millennia. The first traces of human presence, dating from the 3rd millennium BC, were discovered on Trapezitsa Hill.

=== First Bulgarian state ===
Tarnovo was a stronghold of the First Bulgarian Empire. A number of coins, specimens and ceramics from the First Bulgarian State were found on the hills on which the capital city of Tarnovgrad stretched. The city was important for the first Bulgarian state. There was an important military garrison in it. In the Holy Forty Martyrs Church specimens were found that historians believe are the work of Bulgars from Volga Bulgaria.

=== Uprising of Asen and Peter ===
The Uprising of Asen and Peter began on 26 October 1185, the feast day of St. Demetrius of Thessaloniki, and ended with the restoration of Bulgaria with the creation of the Second Bulgarian Empire, ruled by the Asen dynasty. Old Tarnovo would serve as the capital.

=== Medieval Bulgarian rule ===
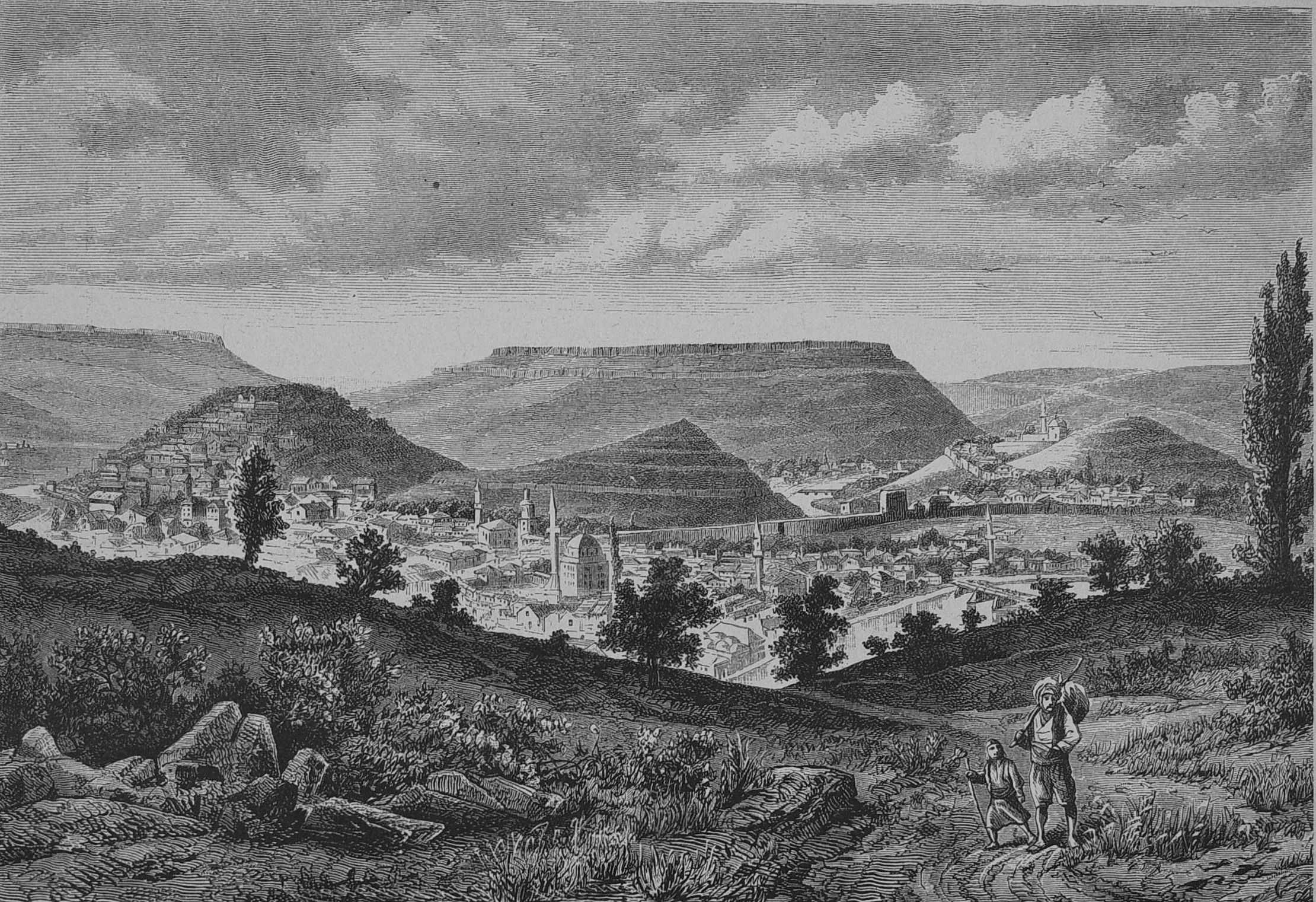
Veliko Tarnovo in 1885

Veliko Tarnovo, originally Tarnovgrad (Търновград), grew quickly to become the strongest Bulgarian fortification and most prosperous city during the second half of the High and the Late Middle Ages and also most important political, economic, cultural and religious centre of the empire.During the 12th–14th centuries, the city of Tarnovgrad served as the capital of the Second Bulgarian Empire, covering an area of approximately 70 hectares across the hills of Tsarevets, Trapezitsa, Momina Krepost (Devingrad), and their surrounding foothills. In the 14th century, the city was described by Bulgarian cleric Gregory Tsamblak as "a very large city, handsome and surrounded by walls, with 12,000 to 15,000 inhabitants"., the fortress of Tsarevets being the primary fortress and strongest bulwark from 1185 to 1393, housing the royal and the patriarchal palaces.

In the 14th century, as the Byzantine Empire weakened, Tarnovo claimed to be the Third Rome, based on its preeminent cultural influence in Southeastern Europe.

As the capital of the Second Bulgarian Empire, Tarnovo was a quasi-cosmopolitan city, with many foreign merchants and envoys. Tarnovo is known to have had Armenian, Jewish and Roman Catholic ("Frankish") merchant quarters, besides a dominant Bulgarian population. The discovery of three Gothic heads of statuettes indicates there may have also been a Catholic church.

=== Ottoman rule ===
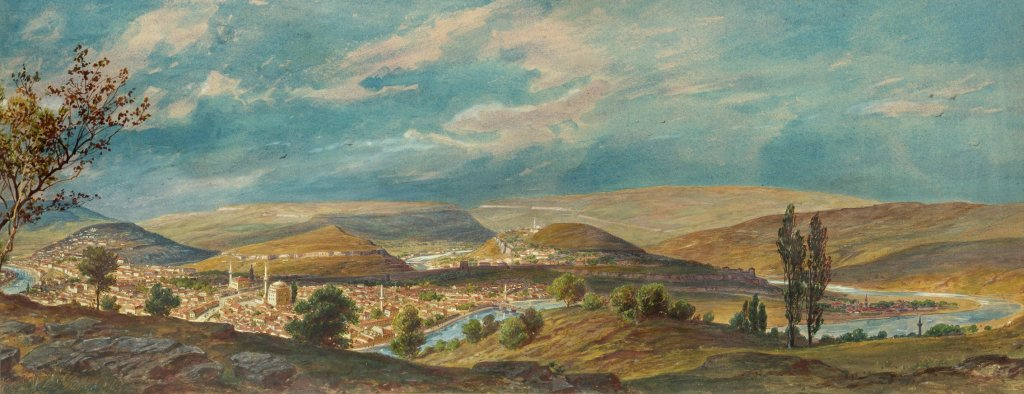
Tarnovo, painting by Felix Kanitz

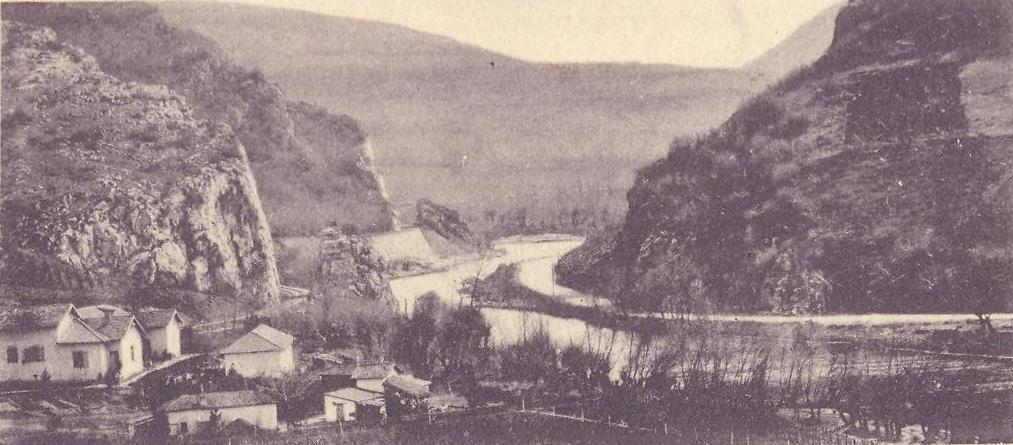
The Prolom Dervent

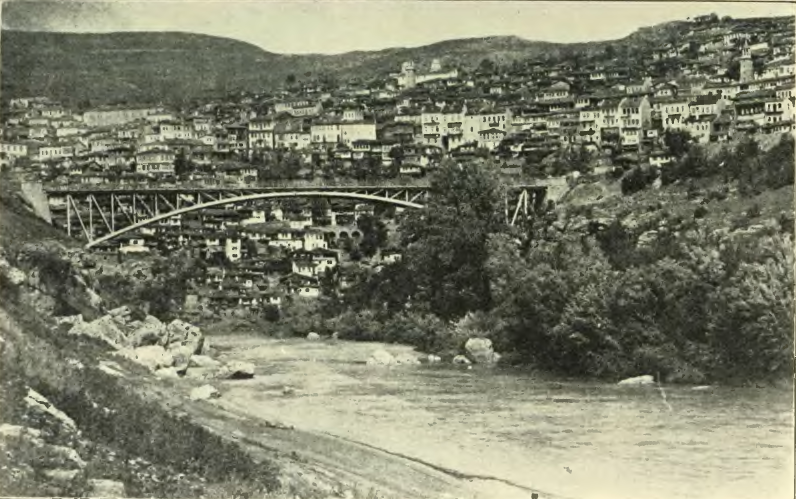
Yantra river

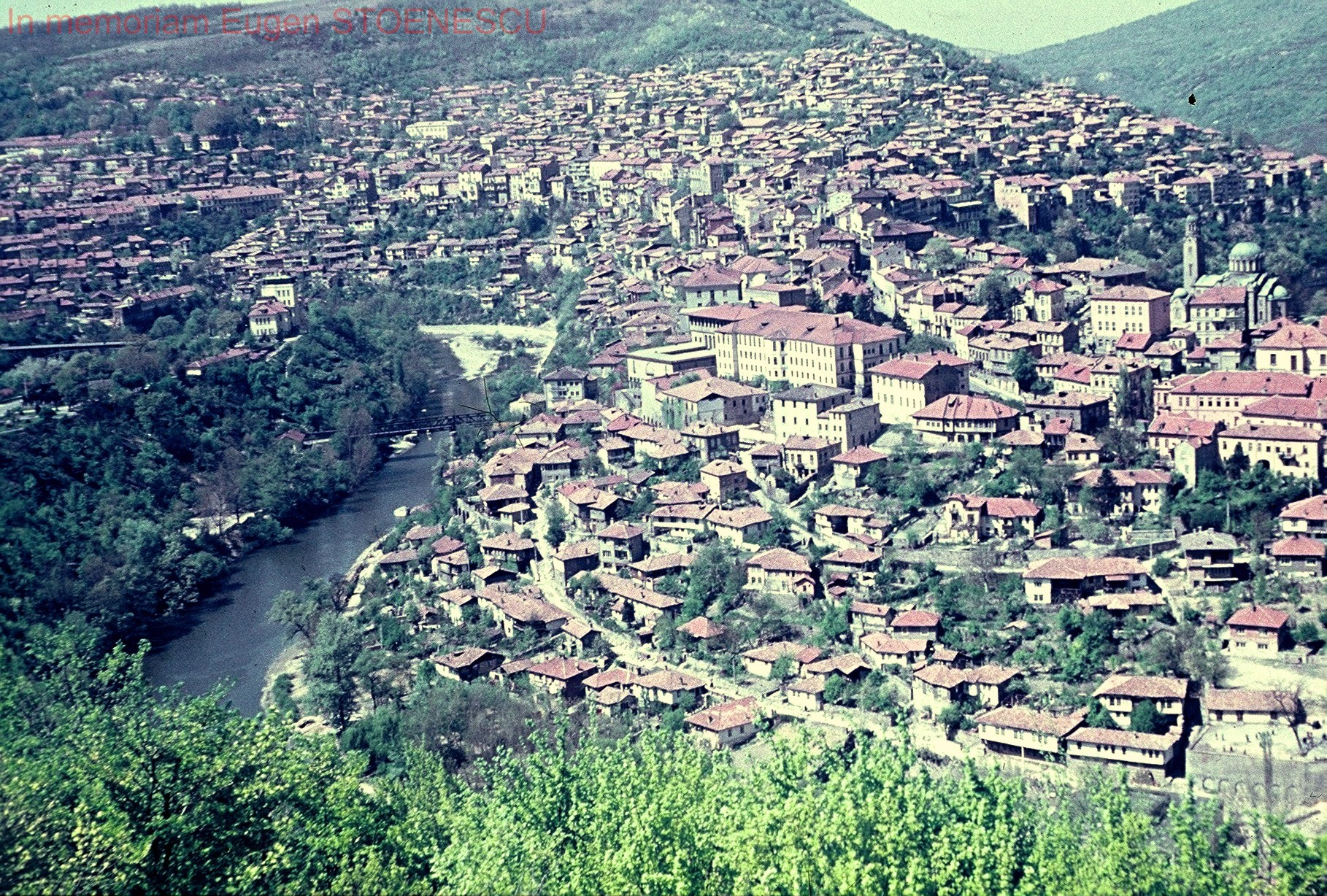
Old Tarnovo part

The political upsurge and spiritual development of Tarnovo were halted when the Ottoman Empire captured the city on 17 July 1393. The siege lasted for three months, with the Bulgarian Patriarch Evtimiy leading the defence. Three years later, the Ottomans conquered the entire Bulgarian Empire.

Bulgarian resistance against Ottoman rule remained centred in Tarnovo (then known as Tırnova) until the end of the 17th century. Two major anti-Ottoman uprisings – in 1598 and in 1686 – started in the city. Tarnovo was consecutively a district (sanjak) capital in the Rumelia Eyalet, in the Silistria Eyalet, and finally in the Danube Vilayet.

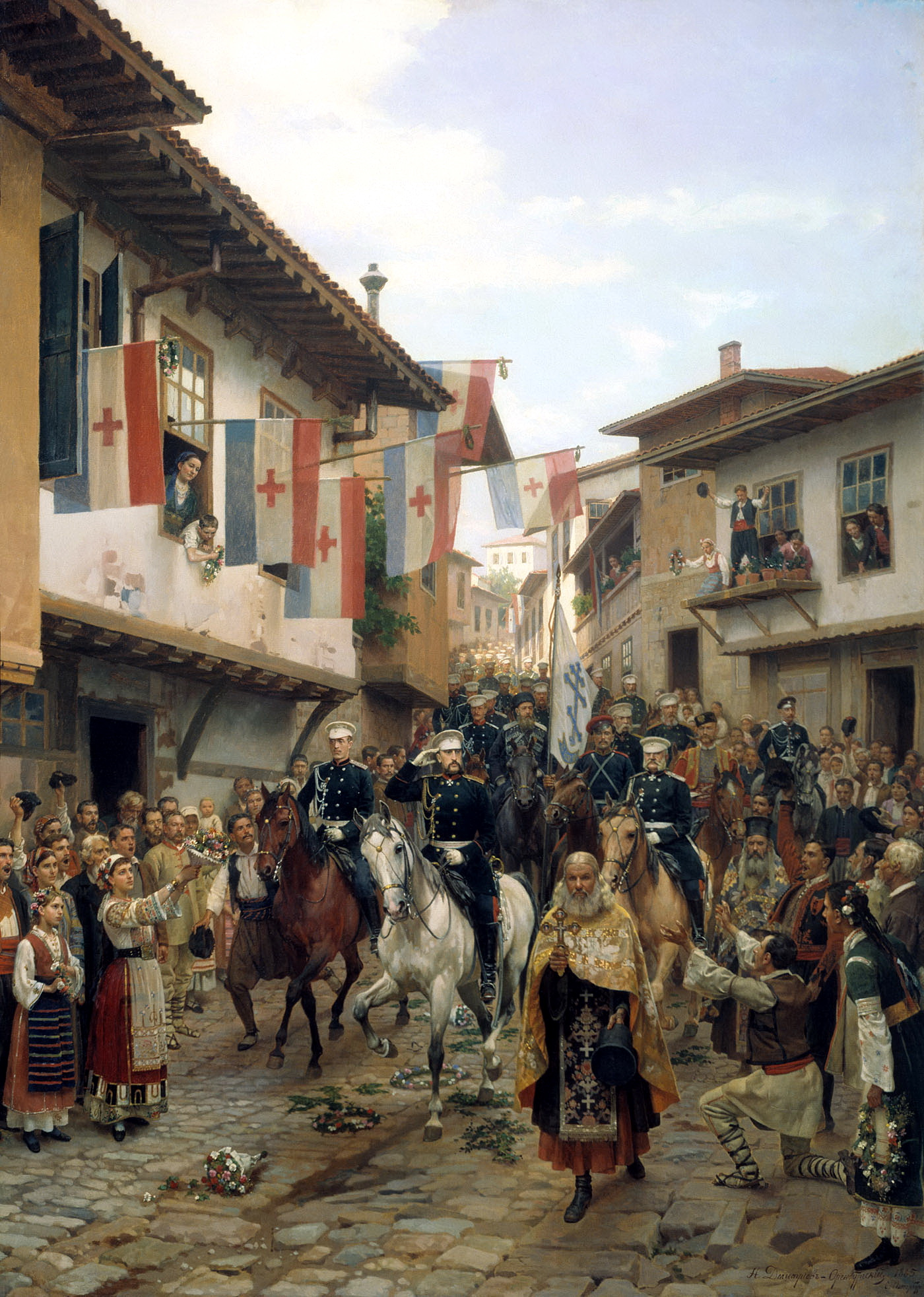
Grand Prince Nikolay Nikolaevich Enters Tarnovo - painted by Nikolai Dmitriev-Orenburgsky in 1883, depicting the city's liberation. In it General Gurko rides behind the Grand Prince at his left side

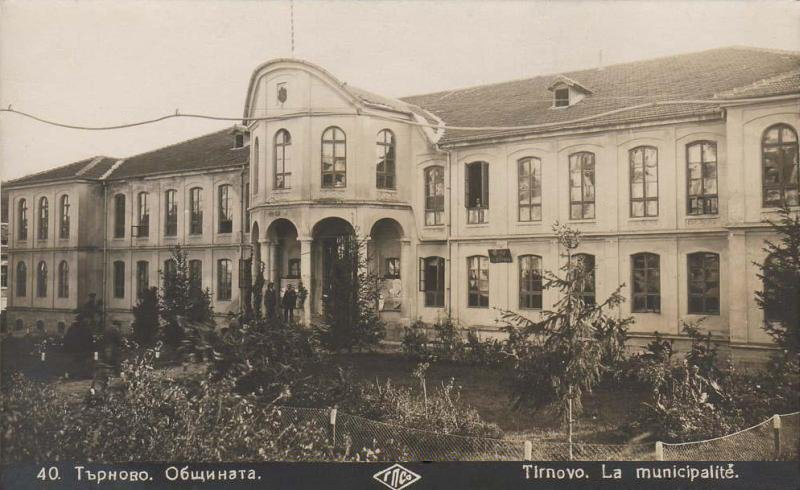
Constituent Assembly of Bulgaria in 1879

Tarnovgrad, along with the rest of present-day Bulgaria, remained under Ottoman rule until the 19th century, when national identity and culture reasserted themselves as a strengthening resistance movement. The goal of the establishment of an independent Bulgarian church and nation motivated the 1875 and 1876 uprisings in the city. On 23 April 1876, the April uprising marked the beginning of the end of the Ottoman occupation. It was soon followed by the Russo-Turkish War (1877–1878).

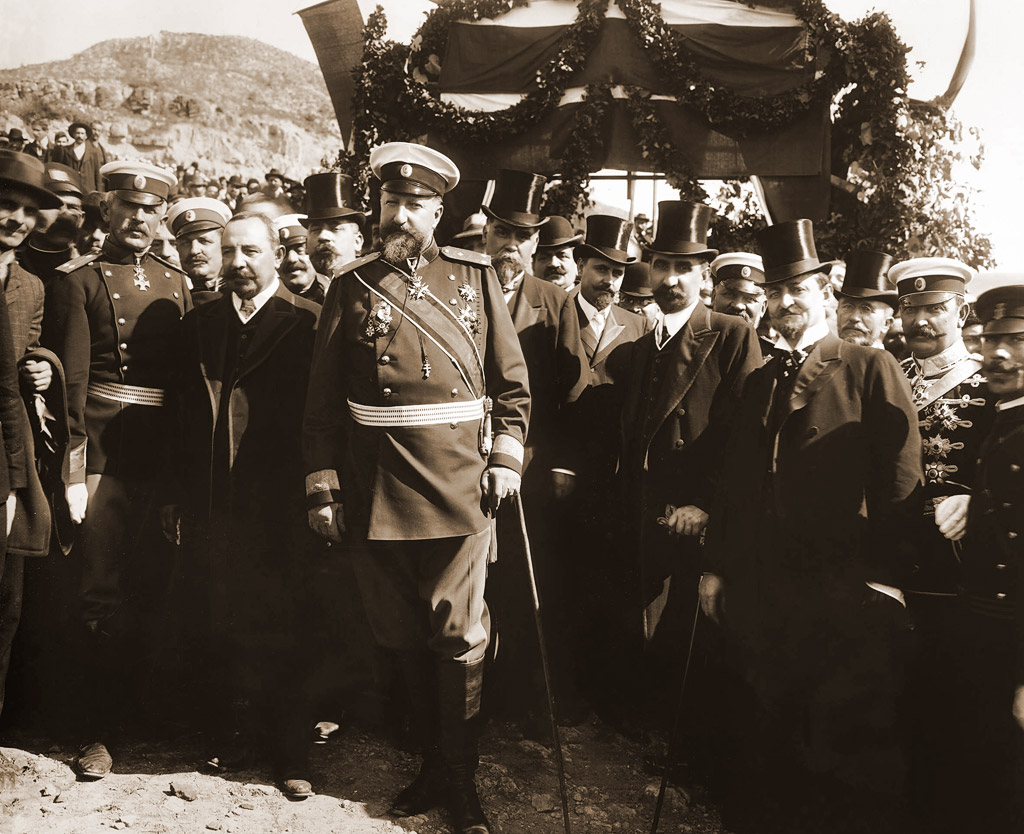
Tzar Ferdinand at the proclamation of Bulgarian independence in 1908

=== Third Bulgarian State ===
On 7 July 1877, Russian general Joseph Vladimirovich Gourko liberated Veliko Tarnovo, ending the 480-year rule of the Ottoman Empire. In 1878, the Treaty of Berlin created a Principality of Bulgaria between the Danube and the Stara Planina range, with its seat at the old Bulgarian capital of Veliko Tarnovo. Due to the capture of Tarnovo by Russian forces, the Muslim refugees fled to Anatolia.

On 17 April 1879, the first National Assembly convened in Veliko Tarnovo to ratify the state's first constitution, known as the Tarnovo Constitution, resulting in the transfer of parliament from Tarnovgrad to Sofia, which today remains the Bulgarian capital.

In deference to the city's past, Tsar Ferdinand, of the House of Saxe-Coburg and Gotha, chose the Forty Holy Martyrs Church in Veliko Tarnovo as the place to declare the complete independence of Bulgaria on 5 October 1908.

In 1965, the city, then officially known as Tarnovo, was renamed Veliko Tarnovo (Great Tarnovo) to commemorate its rich history and importance.

=== People's Republic of Bulgaria ===
During Communist rule, the city underwent considerable changes, with some 10,000 of its population thought to have become members of the Bulgarian Communist Party (BCP) by the end of the 1940s. A number of its churches and private enterprises were closed, while the major industries were nationalized. In the early 1950s, the city underwent an intensive process of urbanization, expanding to the west. From the same period also dates the idea of creating a large urban area in Northern Bulgaria encompassing the neighboring city of Veliko Tarnovo and the towns of Gorna Oryahovitsa and Lyaskovets (popularly known as "Targolyas").

In 1963, the University of Veliko Tarnovo "St. Cyril and St. Methodius" opened as one of the largest institutions of higher education in the country. Urbanization continued during the 1970s, as the engineering, electronic, medical, computer, and furniture industries expanded in the region, adding the neighborhoods of Akacia and Kartala to the city's landscape.

== Population ==
According to the 2011 census, Veliko Tarnovo had a population of 68,783 as of February 2011, while the Veliko Tarnovo Municipality, including the villages, had 88,670.

Historical population
Year	Pop.	±%
1887	11,314	—
1910	12,469	+10.2%
1934	13,963	+12.0%
1946	16,223	+16.2%
1956	24,648	+51.9%
1965	37,276	+51.2%
1975	56,522	+51.6%
1985	69,605	+23.1%
1992	67,540	−3.0%
2001	66,897	−1.0%
2011	68,783	+2.8%
2021	58,507	−14.9%
Source: Censuses

=== Ethnic composition ===
According to the latest 2011 census data, individuals declaring their ethnic identity were distributed as follows:

- Bulgarians: 59,649 (95.5%)
- Turks: 2,225 (3.6%)
- Roma: 123 (0.2%)
- Others: 258 (0.4%)
- Indefinable: 198 (0.3%)
- Romanians: 100
  - Undeclared: 6,330 (9.2%)

Total: 68,883

=== Neighborhoods ===
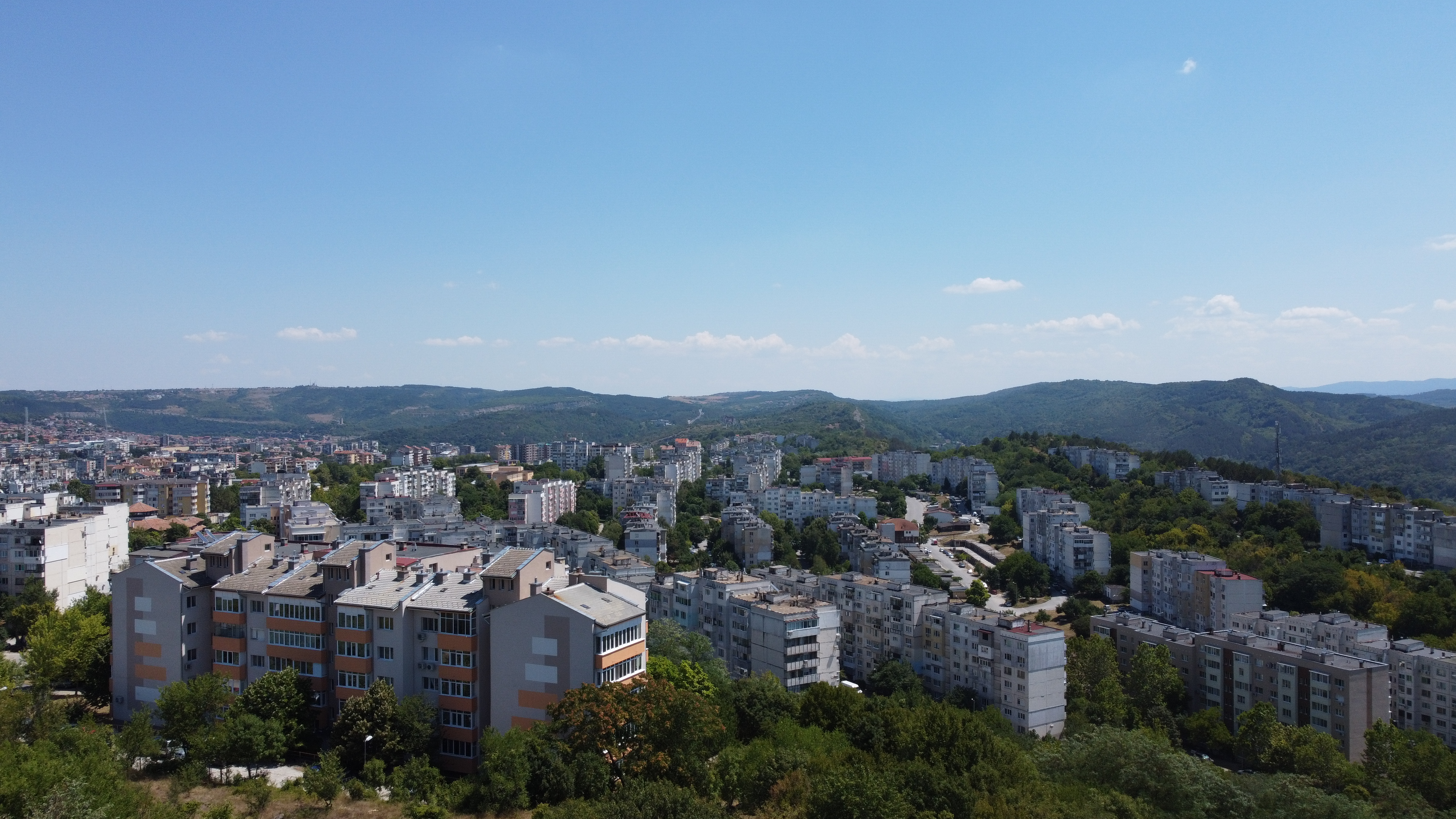
Buzludzha district

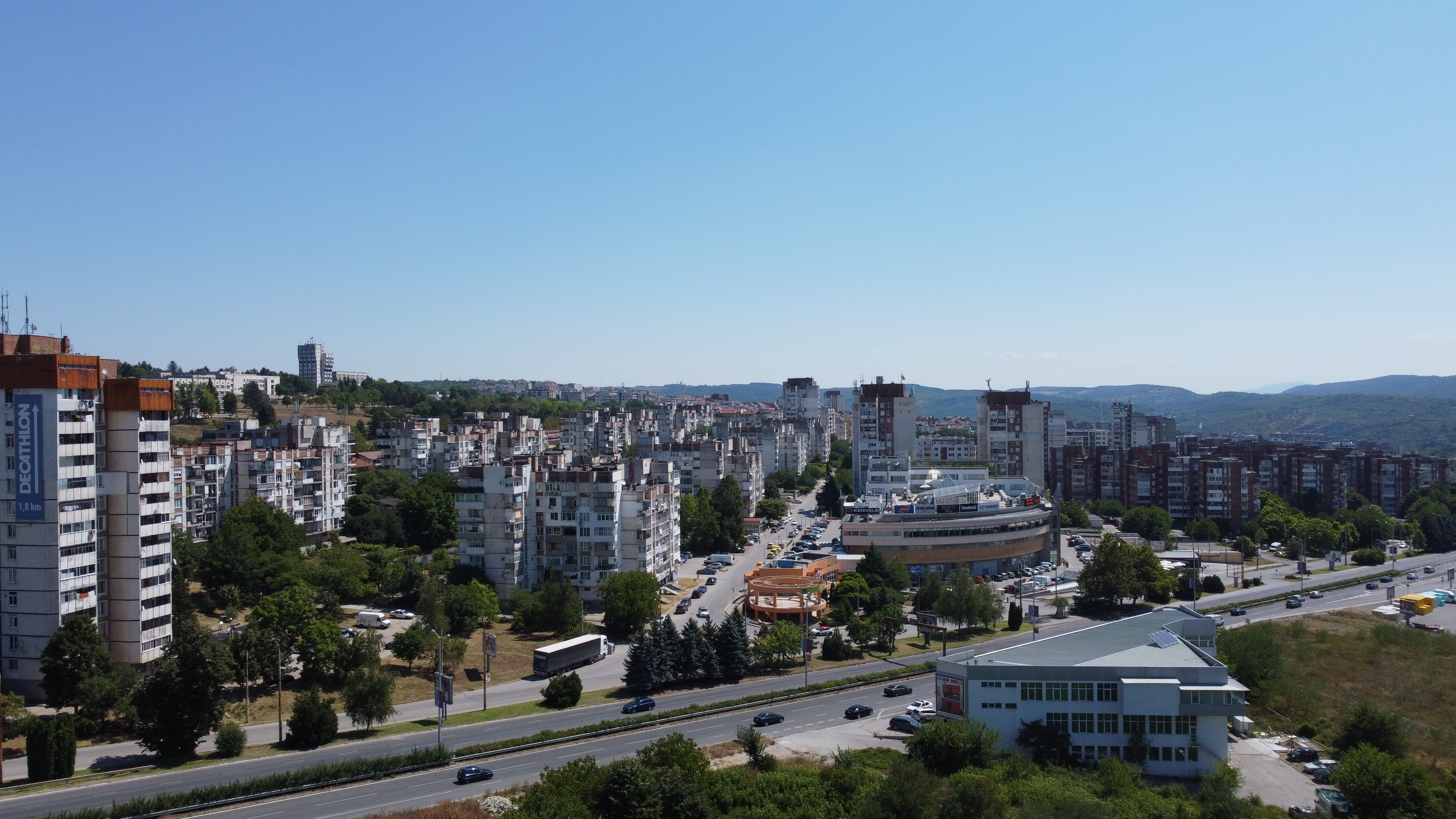
Kolyo Fitcheto district

- "Buzluđa" (Bulgarian: "Бузлуджа") – 19,500 people
- "Kolio Ficheto" or "Triagalnika" ("Кольо Фичето"/"Триъгълника") – 17,000 people
- "Shirok centar" ("Широк център") – 10,000 people
- "Tsentar" ("Център") – 8,000 people
- "Zona B" ("Зона Б") – 8,000 people
- "Kartala" ("Картала") – 4,800 people
- "Akatsia" ("Акация") – 3,200 people
- "Cholakovtsi" ("Чолаковци") – 4,200 people
- "Sveta gora" ("Света гора") – 3,140 people
- "Varusha North" ("Варуша Север") – 900 people
- "Varusha South" ("Варуша Юг") – 300 people
- "Asenov" ("Асенов") – 800 people
- "Zona A" ("Зона А") – 200 people (also ville zone)
- "Slanchev dom" ("Слънчев дом") – 80 people
- "Veliko Tarnovo hills" – (being constructed)
- Ville zone "Derven" ("Дервен") – 80 people
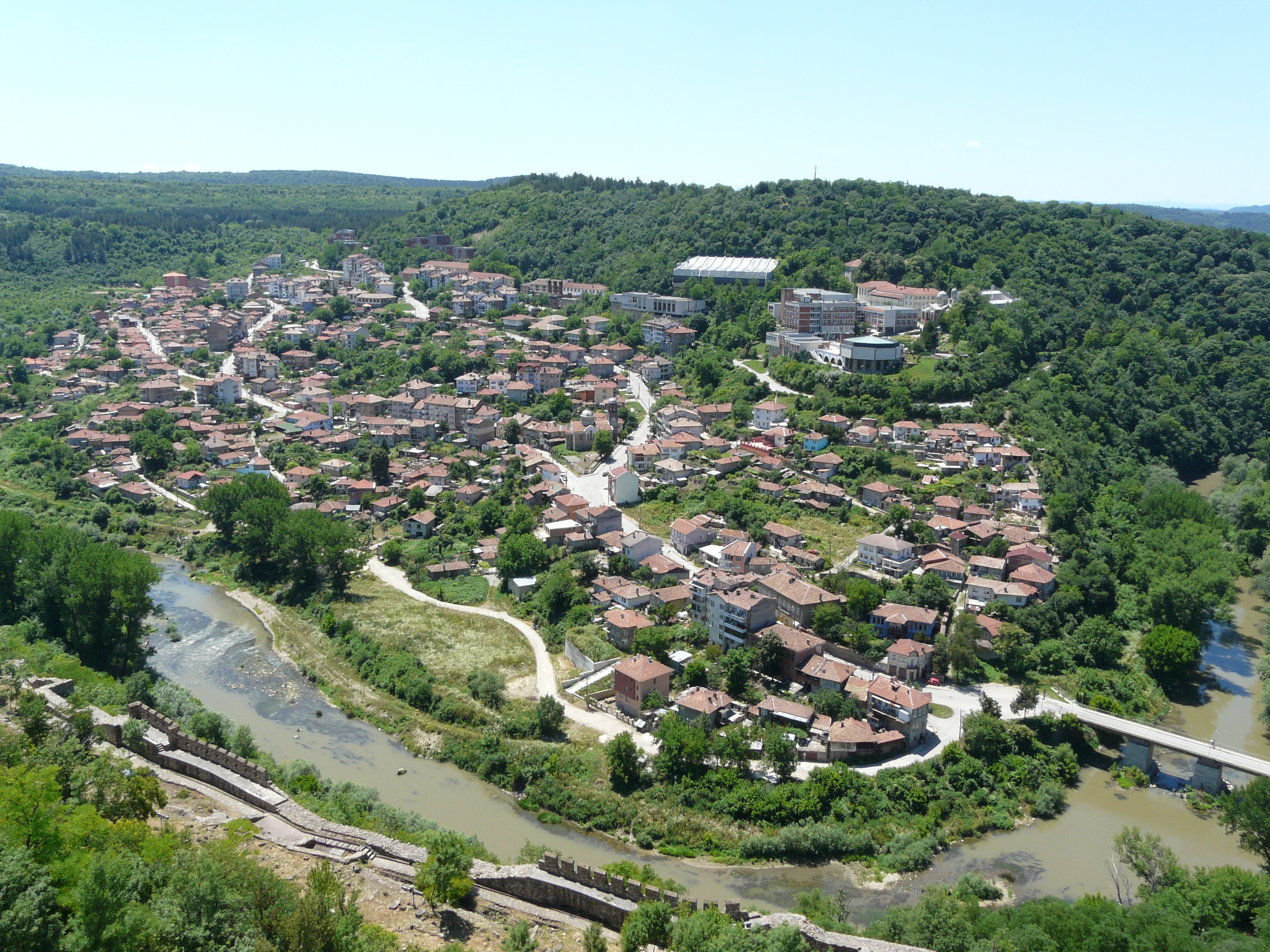
"Sveta gora"

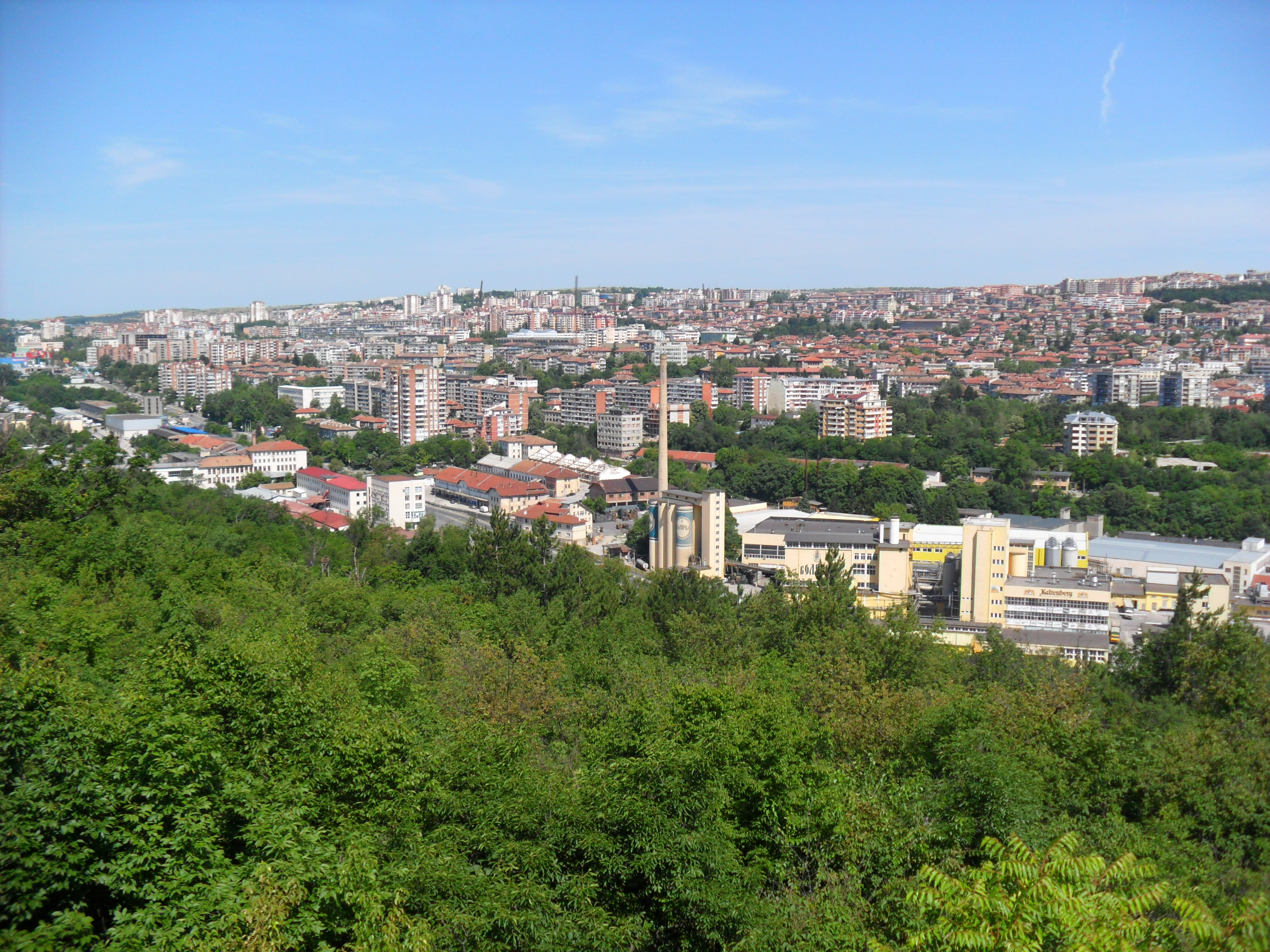
Center

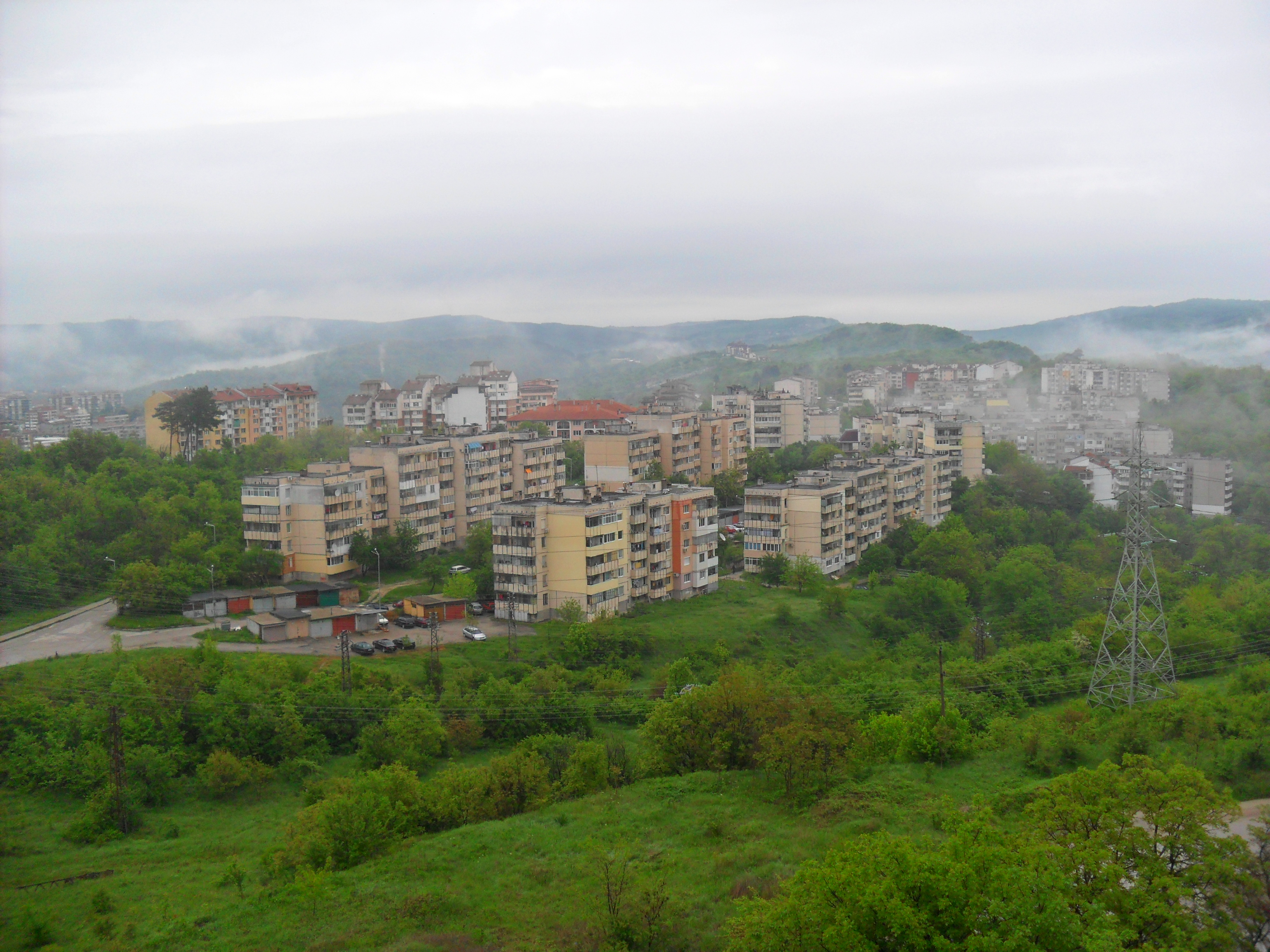
"Zona B"

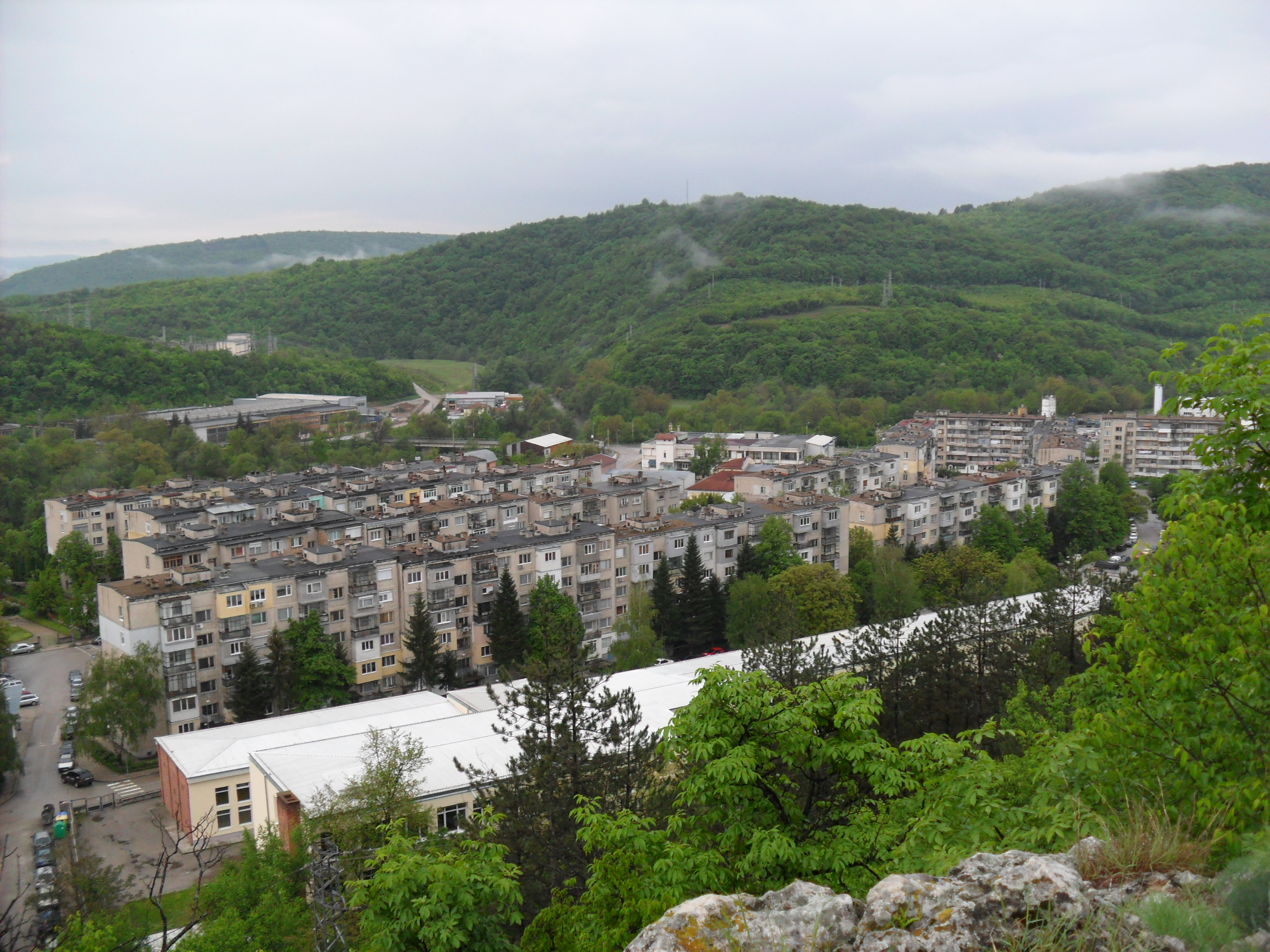
"Cholakovtsi"

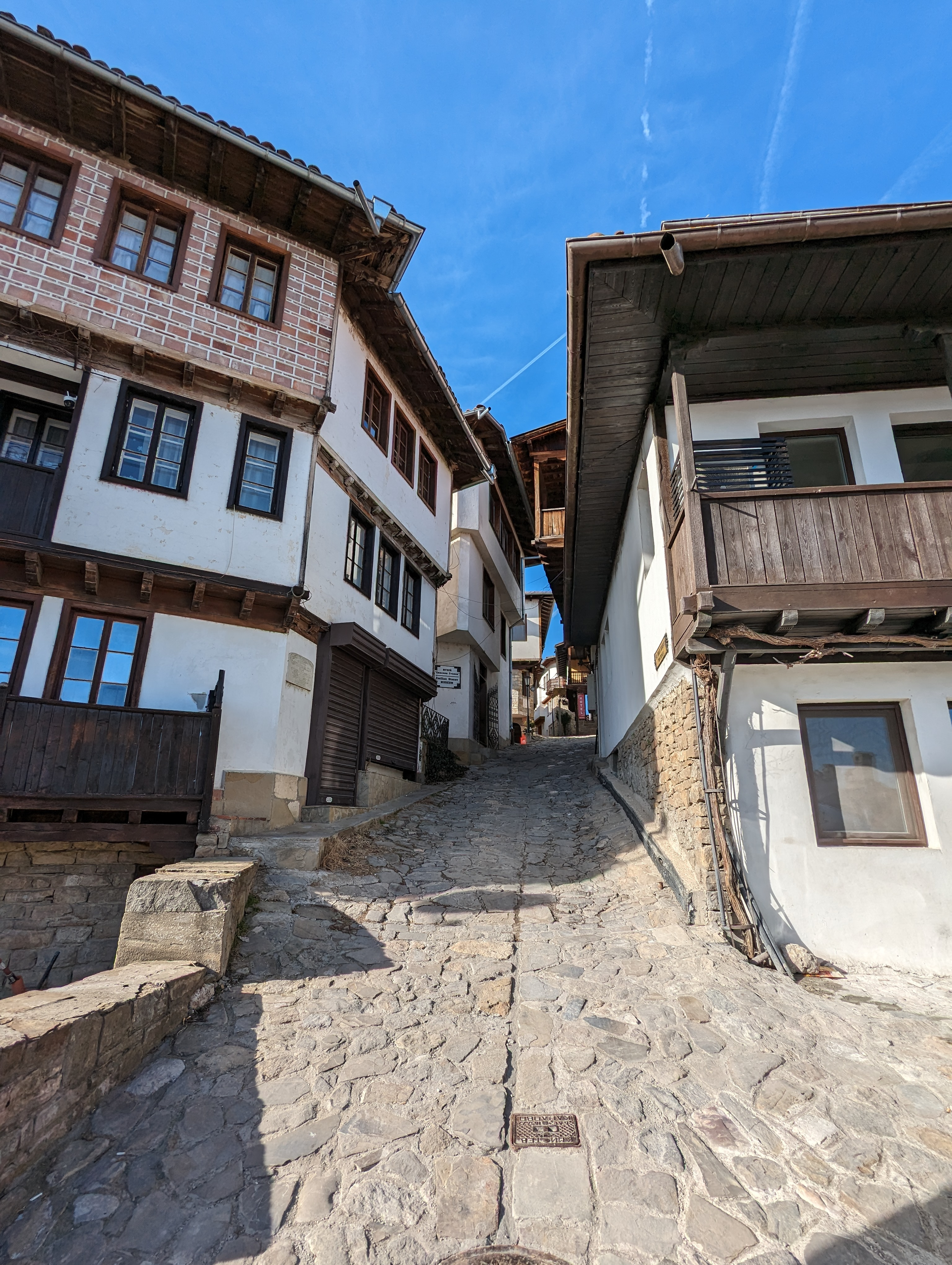
"Varusha North"

The ethnic composition of Veliko Tarnovo Municipality is 100,570 Bulgarians, 3,681 Turks and 595 Gypsies, among others.

== Culture ==
Culture in Veliko Tarnovo has been developing from the time when it was a capital city.

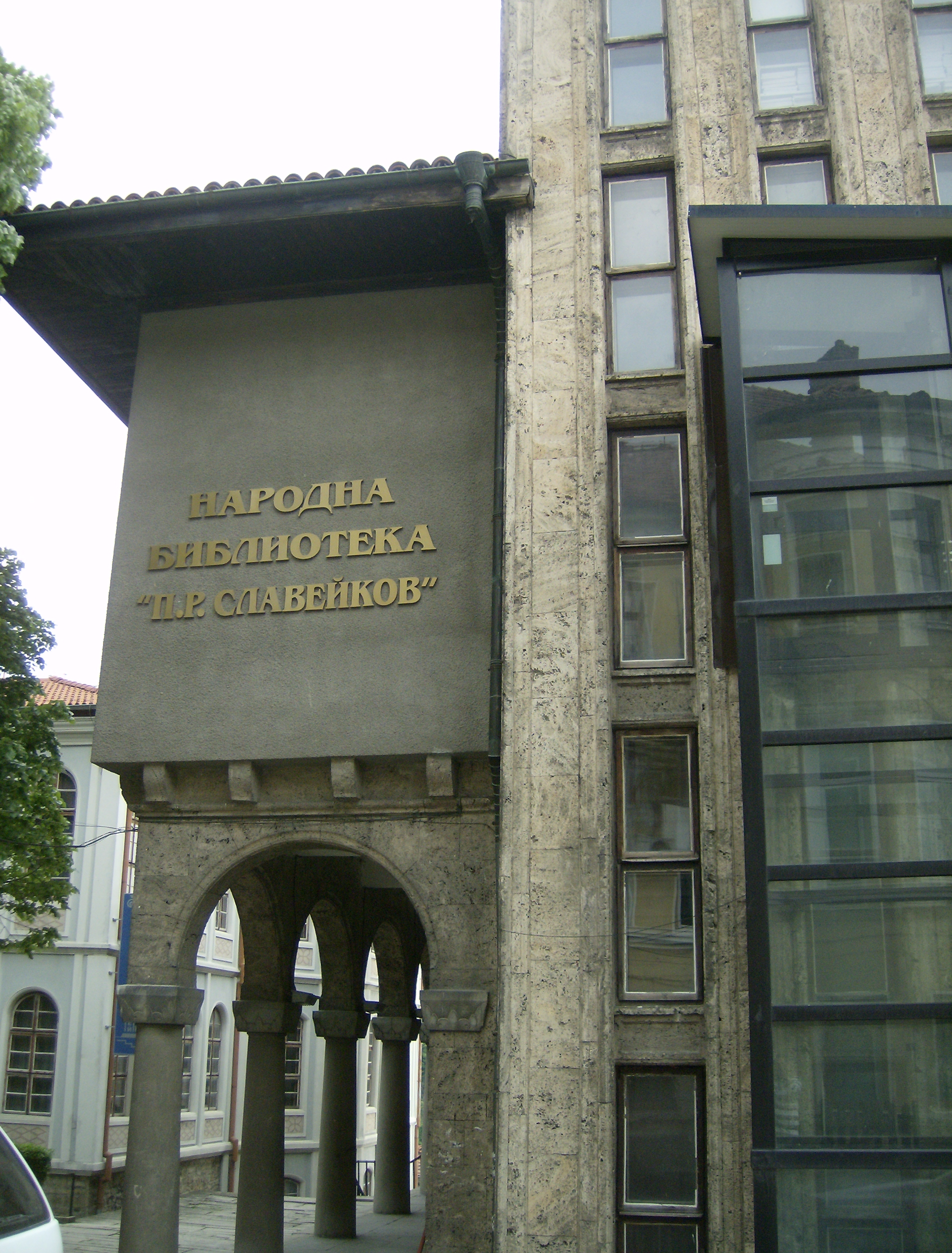
Regional Library Petko Slaveykov

- Regional Library Petko Slaveykov
- Communication center "Nadezhda 1869"
- Musical-dramatic theater "Konstantin Kisimov"
- Art Gallery "Boris Denev"

== Education ==
Church schools have existed in the medieval capital since XV century. The first church school in the church "St. Nikolai ”was established in 1839. In 1839 there was a secular mutual school in the town with teachers Petko Nikolov and Zahari Knyazhevski. The first class school in the city was established in 1855. A Greek school existed in the city until the Liberation of Bulgaria.

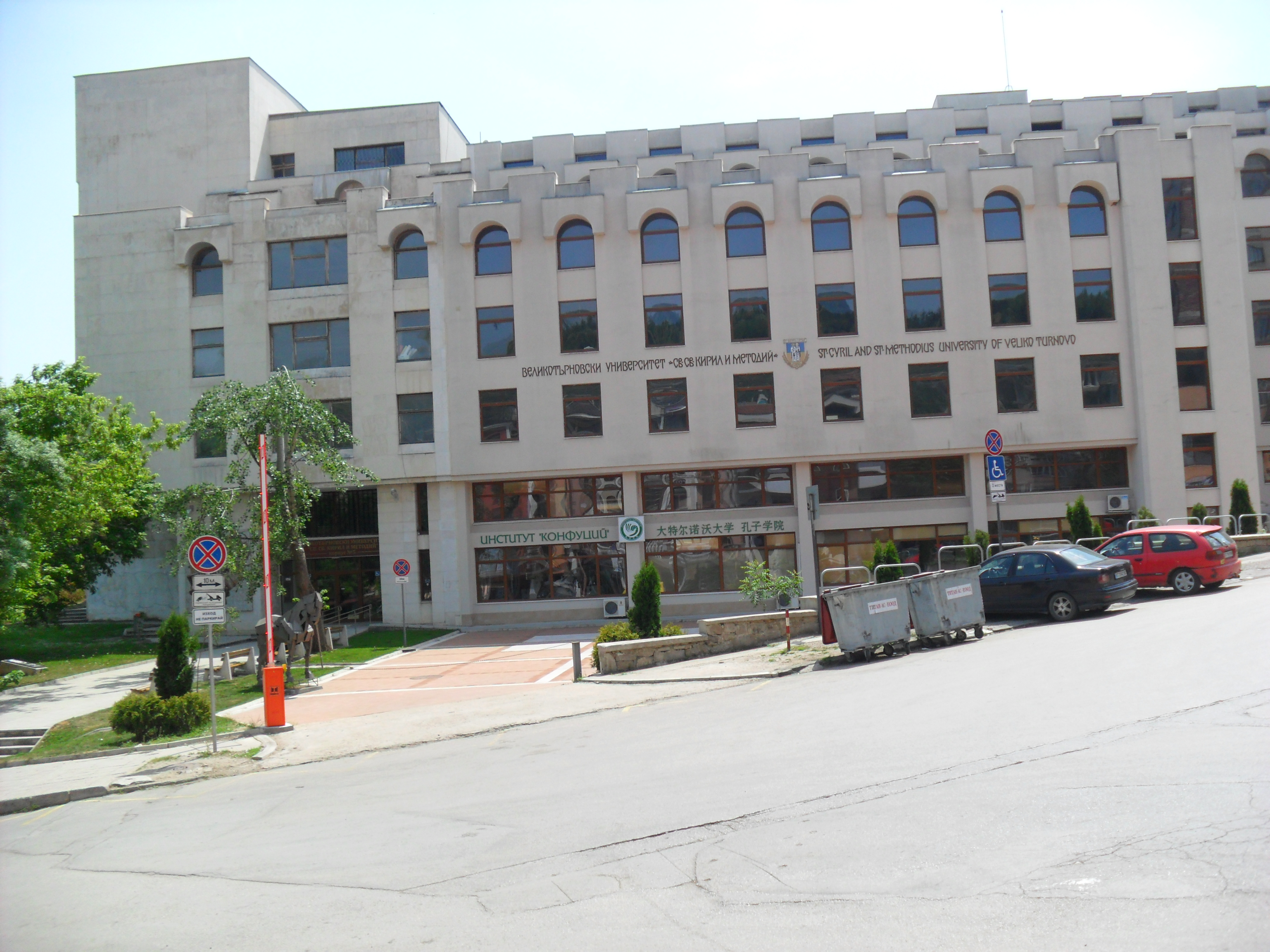
University of Veliko Tarnovo

=== Higher education ===
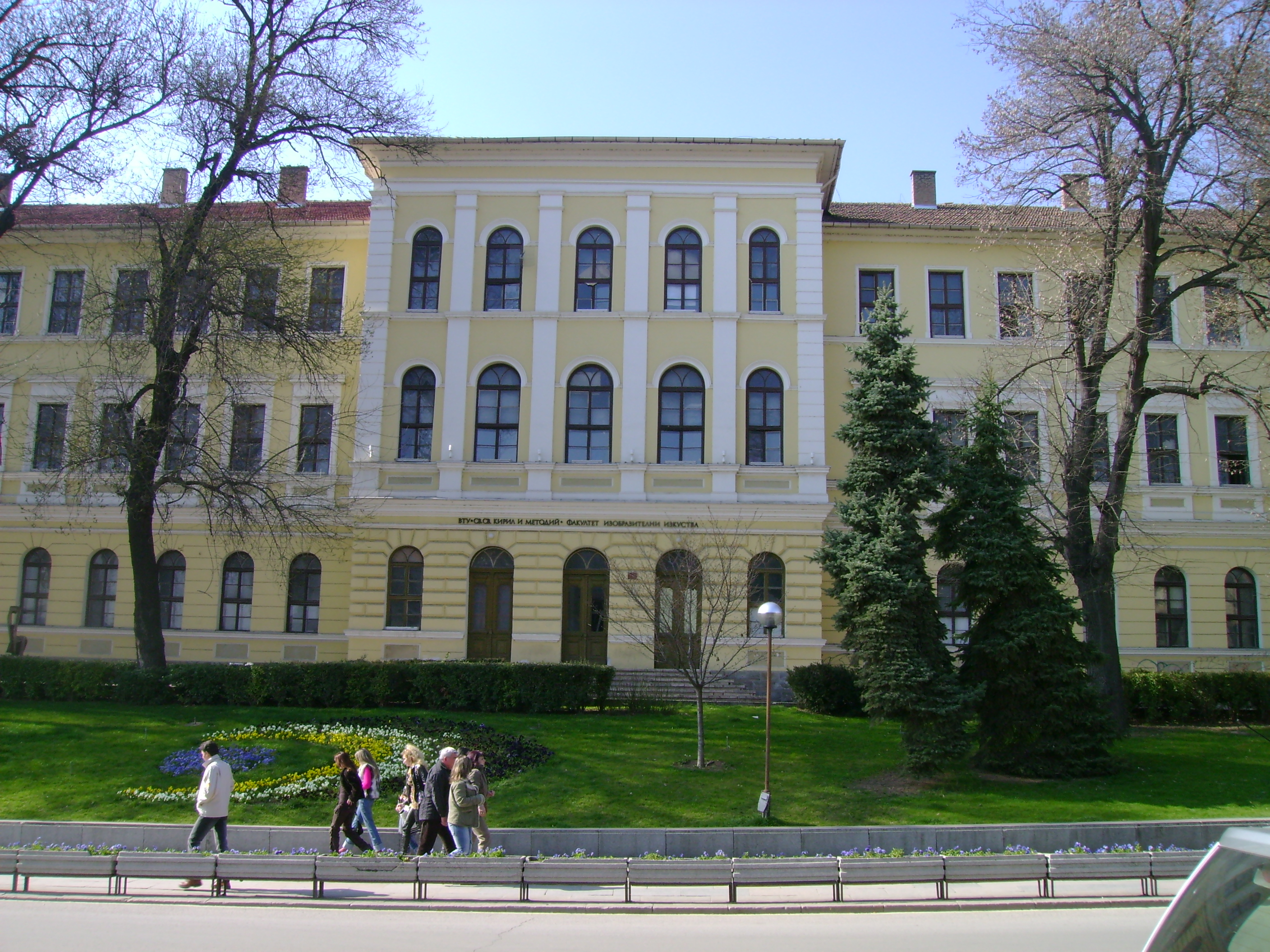
The Faculty of Fine Arts building of Veliko Tarnovo University

Veliko Tarnovo has two universities, Veliko Tarnovo University (one of the biggest universities in Bulgaria) and Vasil Levski National Military University. The Veliko Tarnovo University currently has around 18,000 students. Vasil Levski National Military University is one of the oldest military universities in Bulgaria.

=== Secondary education ===
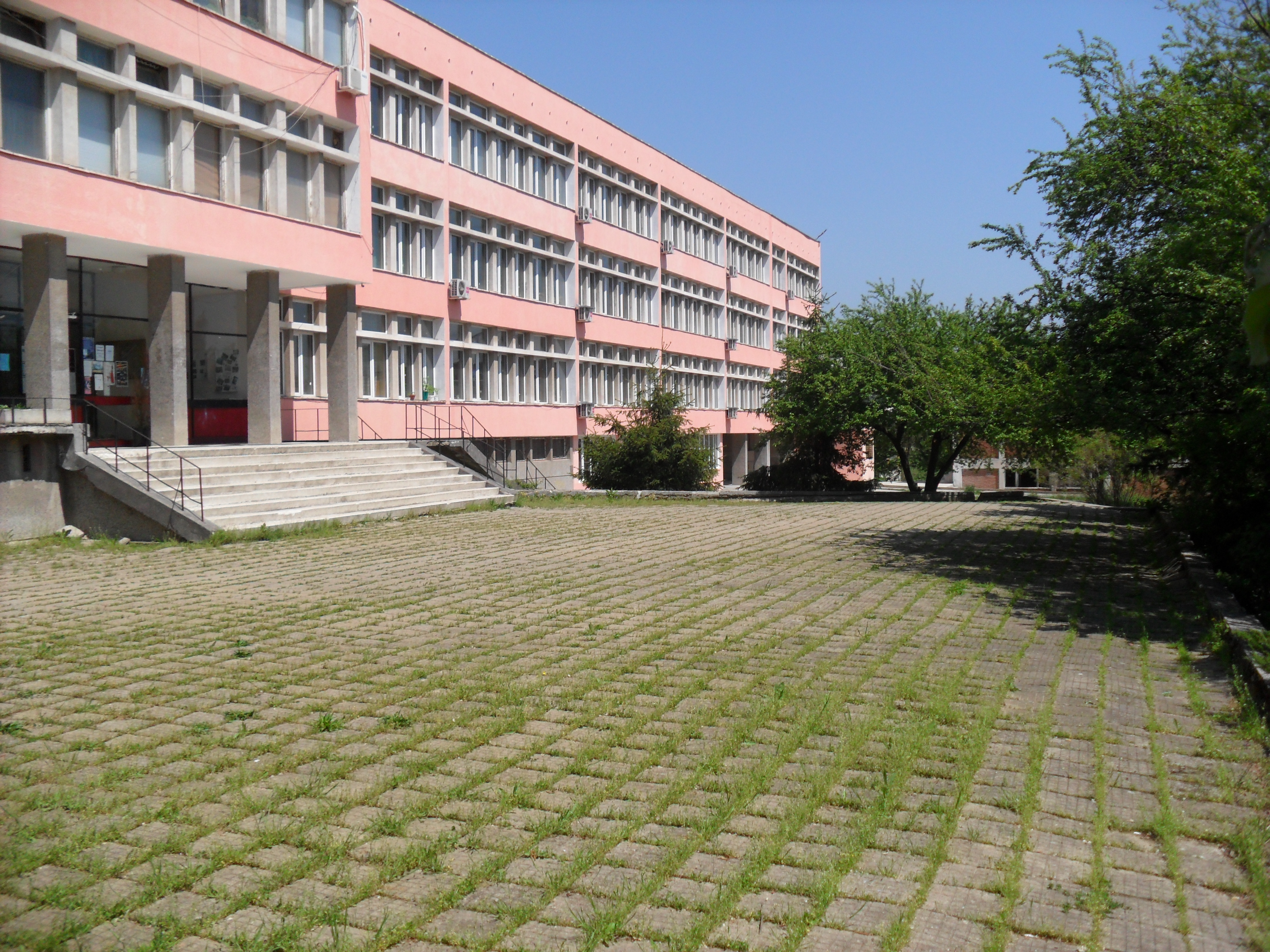
A.S. Popov School of Electronics

Veliko Tarnovo currently has four secondary schools: Secondary School Emiliyan Stanev (main subject: music, art, informatics), Secondary School Vela Blagoeva (main subject: informatics), Secondary School Georgi Sava Rakovski (main subject: sports) and Secondary School Vladimir Komarov. There are nine high schools: Vasil Drumev School of Natural Sciences and Math (biology, chemistry, math), Professor Asen Zlatarov School (foreign languages), Honorary Old School of Economics, St. Cyril and Methodius School of Humanities (literature, history, Bulgarian language), A.S. Popov School of Electronics (computers, electronics), Kolyo Ficheto School of Building Construction (buildings), Angel Popov School of Architecture and Surveying (architecture, surveying), Professor Vasil Beron School of Tourism (cooking, restaurant, hotel), Vocational School of Fashion Design (sewing, design), and the American college, Arcus.

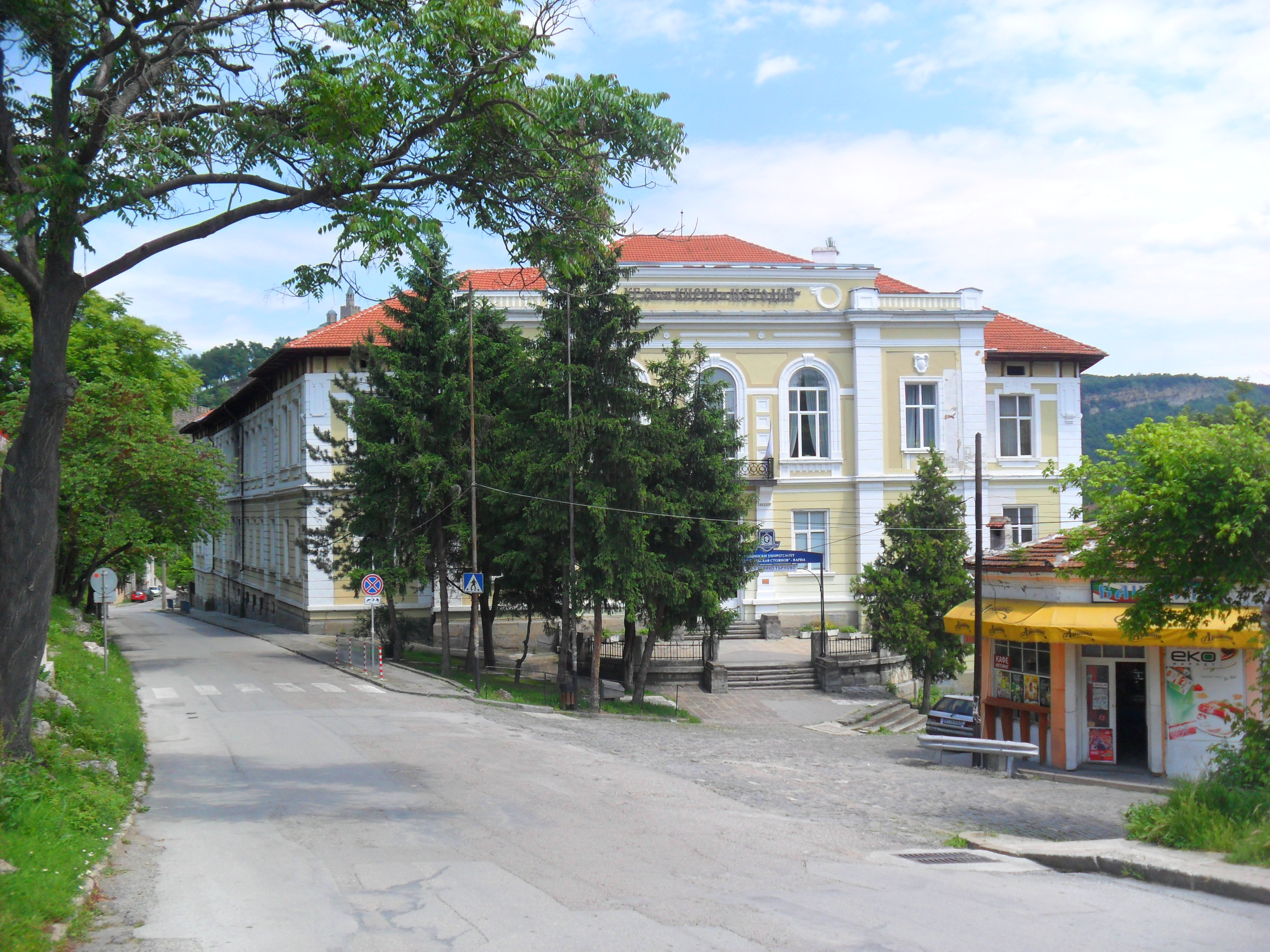
The city's first high school

=== Primary education ===
The city has five primary schools, named "St. Patriarch Euthymius" (since 1969), "Dimitar Blagoev", "Petko R. Slaveykov" and "Bacho Kiro". The schools educate students from ages 6 to 14. The subjects are Bulgarian language, math, biology, chemistry, physics, music, art, and others. The most popular sports include football, volleyball, basketball and handball, among others. Beginning with their first class, children learn English, and after four years they can study languages such as Russian, French, German, and Italian.

=== Religion ===
More than 90% of the residents are Eastern Orthodox. In Veliko Turnovo there is a mosque, a Catholic church, a community of the Evangelical Methodist Episcopal Church, and representatives of other Christian teachings. During the Middle Ages, the seat of the Patriarchate of Veliko Turnovo, the Diocese of Veliko Turnovo and Veliko Turnovo's spiritual districts was in Turnovo.

==== Orthodox churches ====
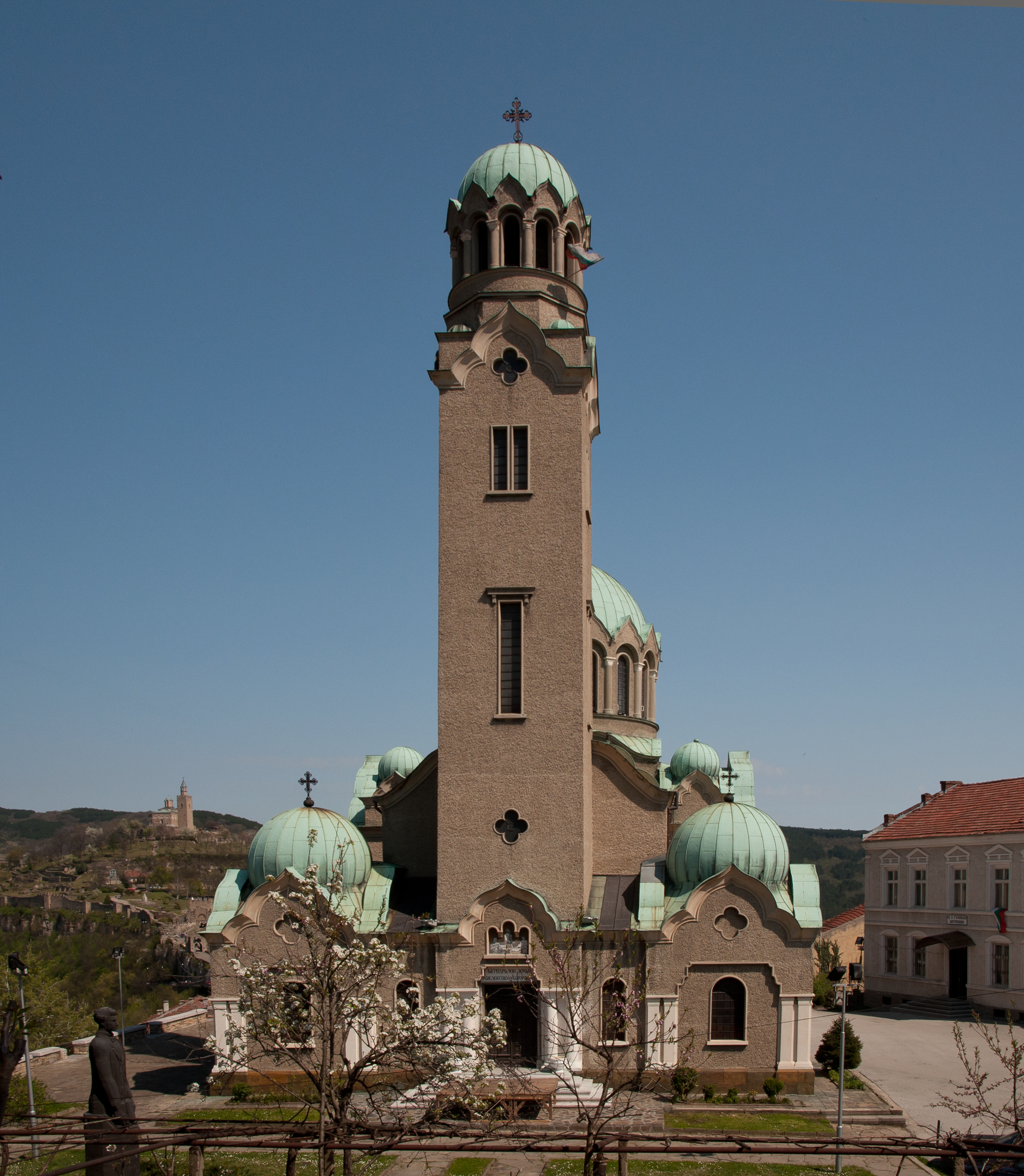
Nativity of Mary Church

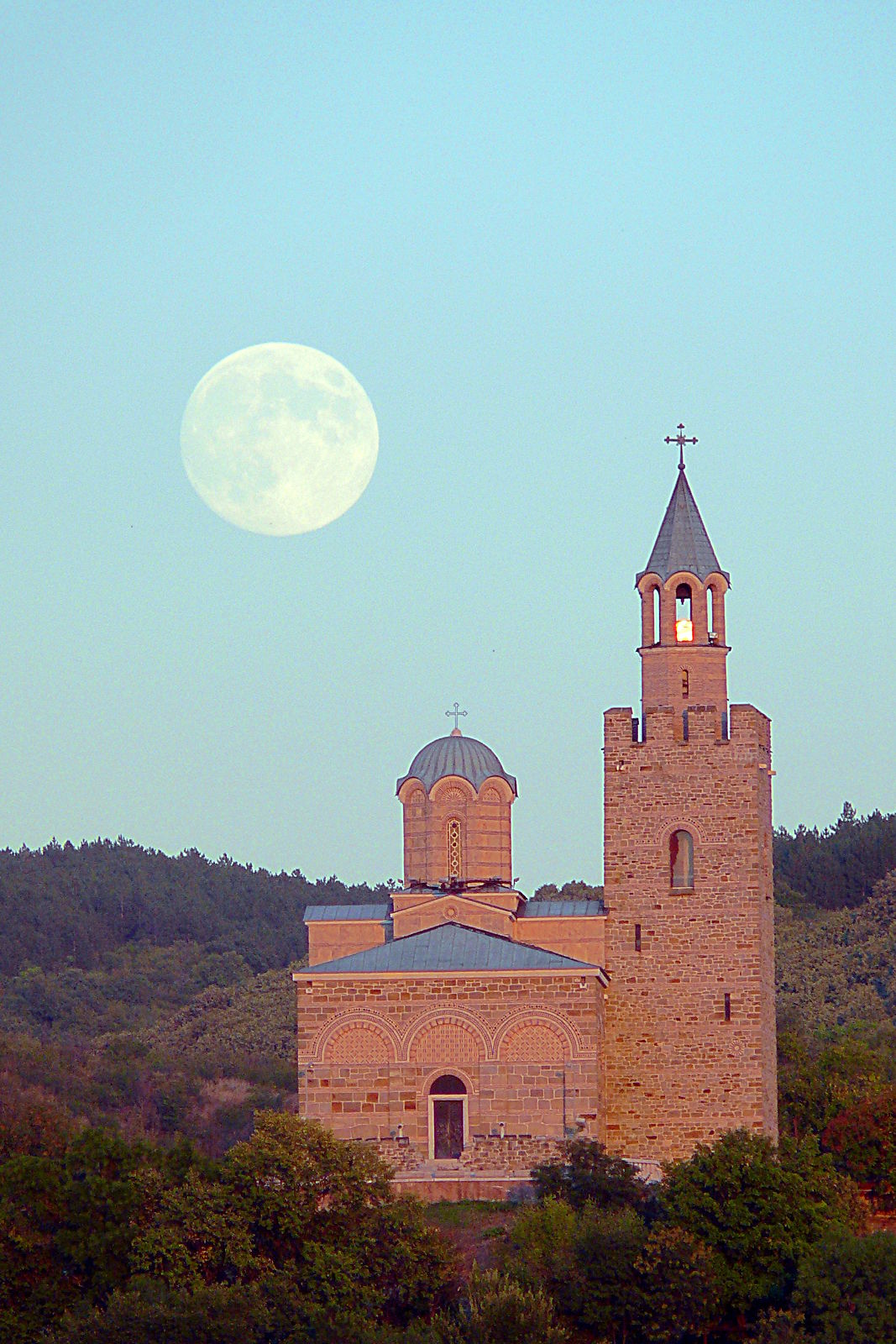
Patriarchal Cathedral

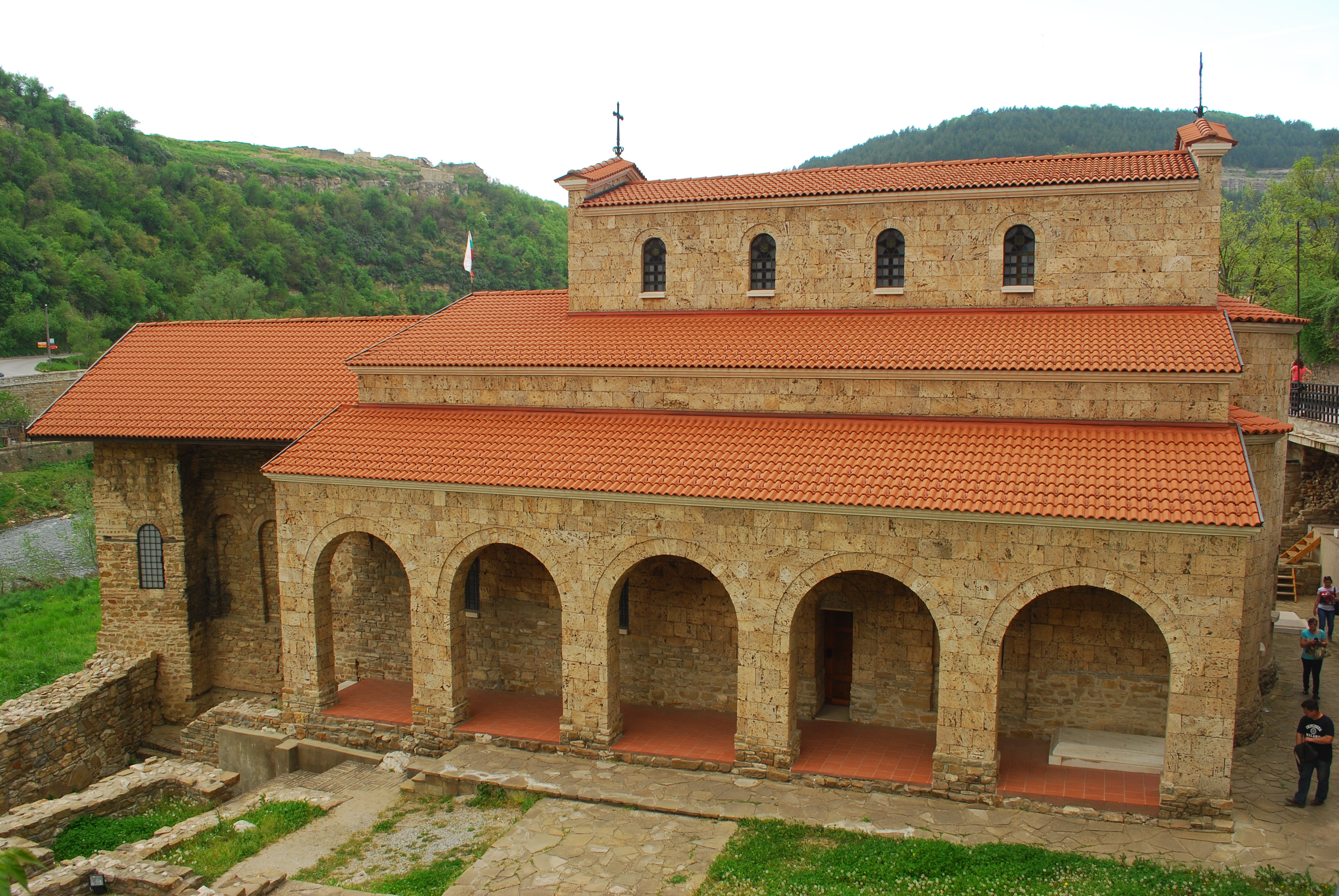
Holy Forty Martyrs church

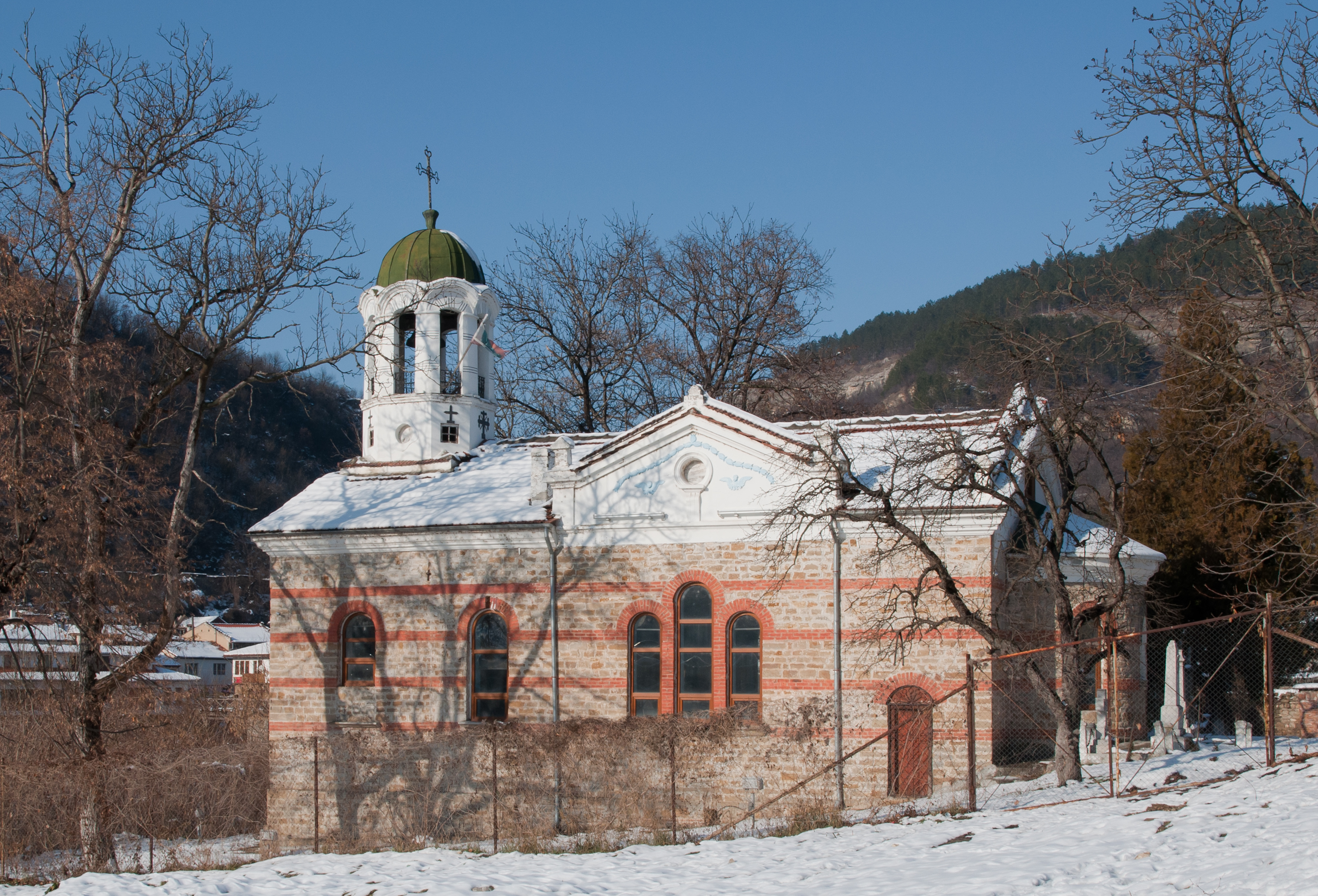
Dormition of the Theotokos Church

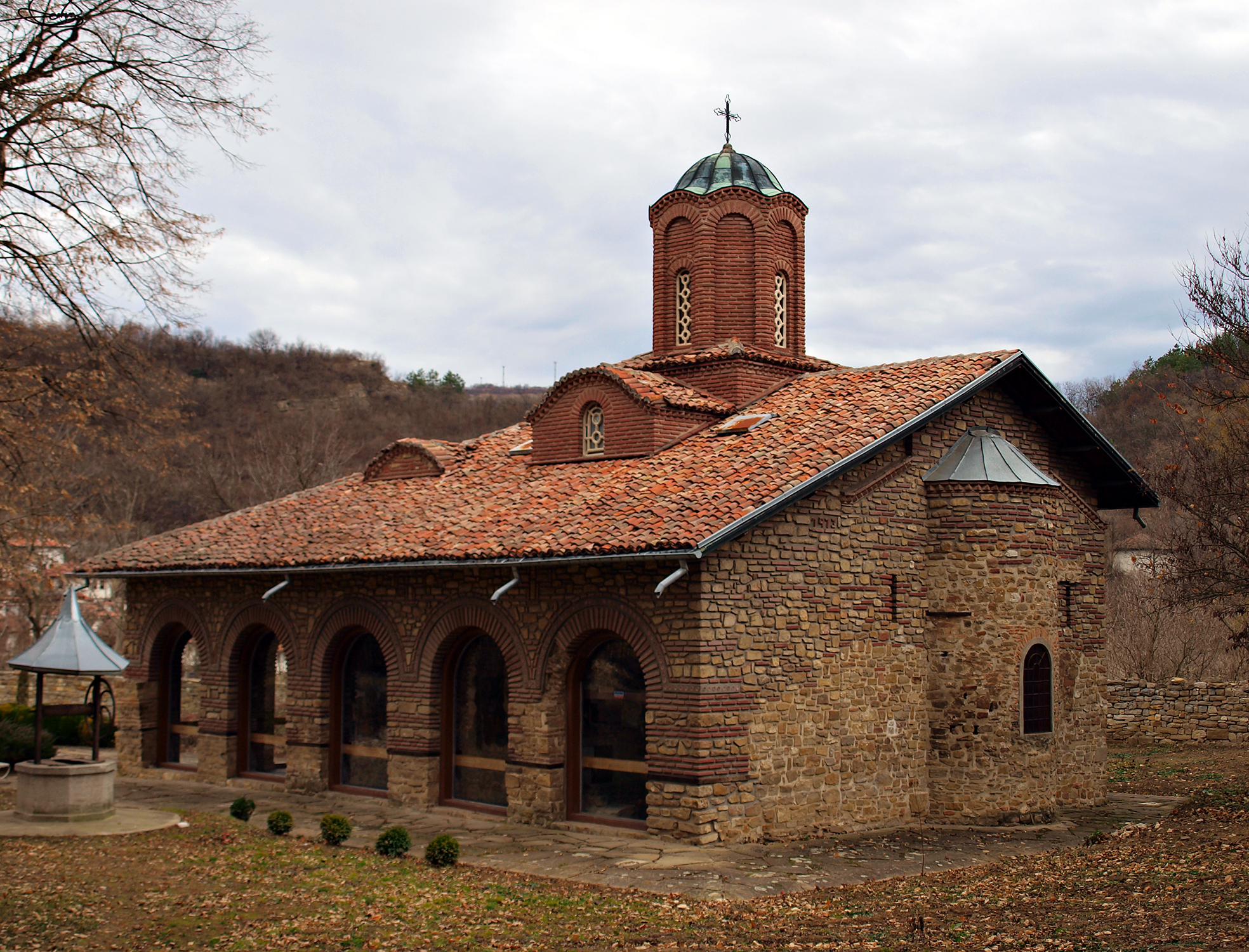
Church of Saints Peter and Paul

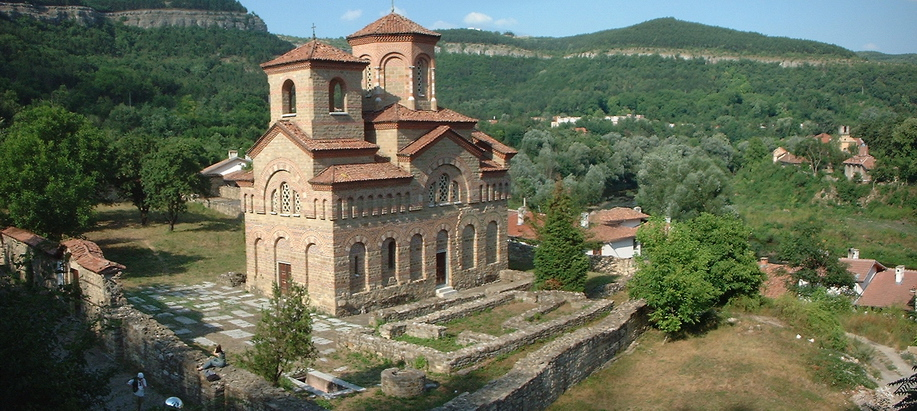
Church of St Demetrius of Thessaloniki

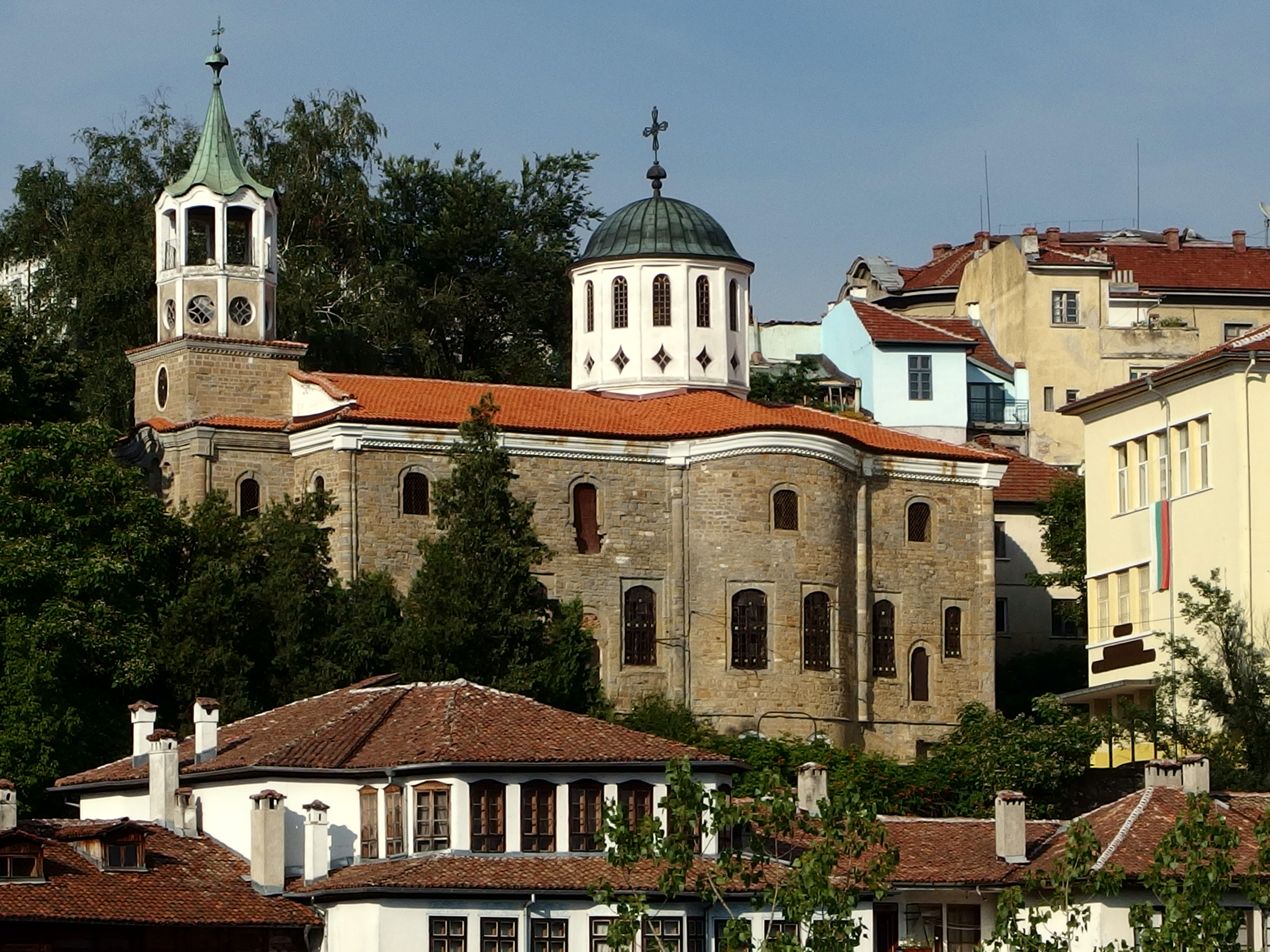
Church of Saints Constantine and Helena

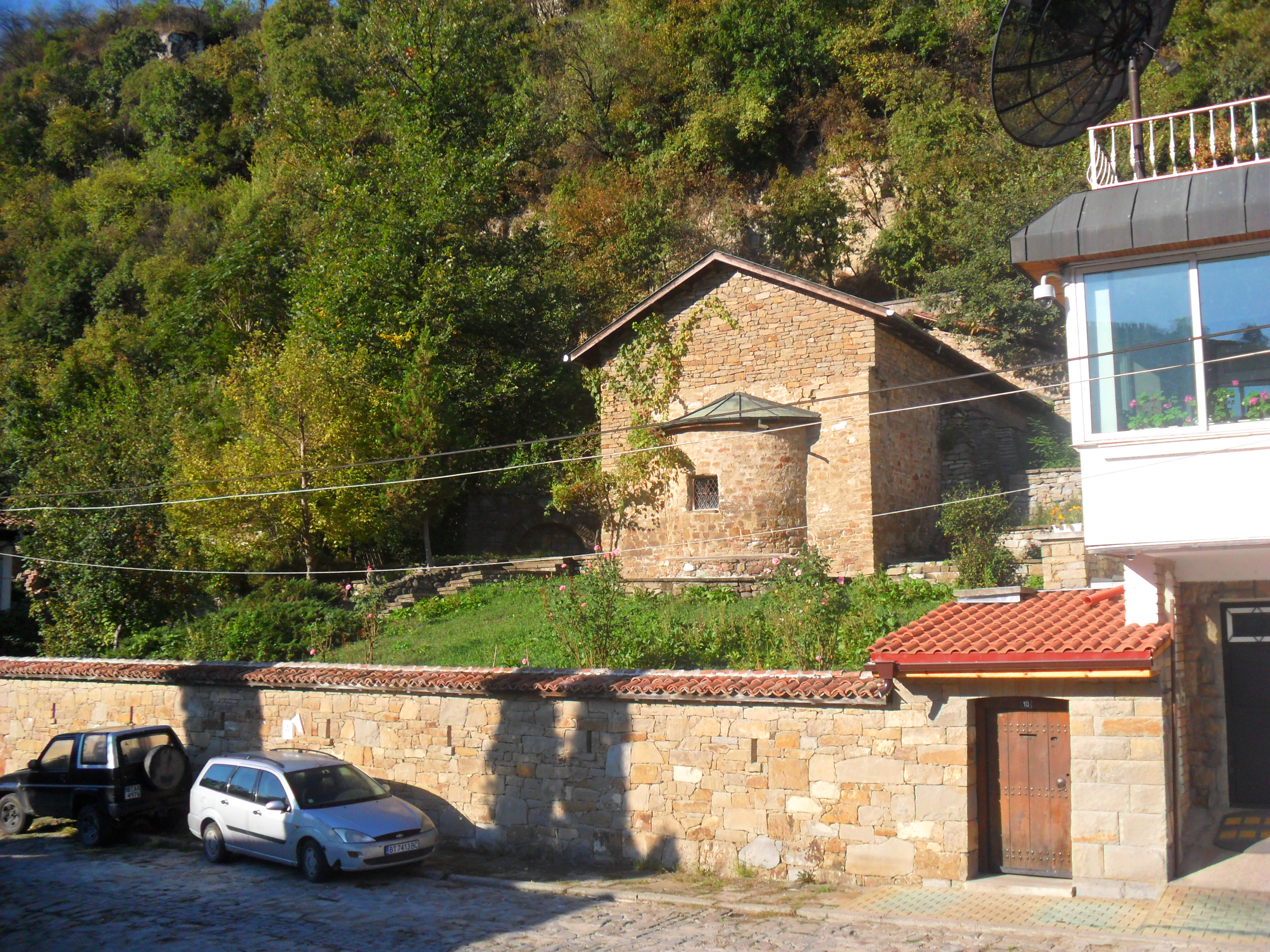
Saint Georgi Church

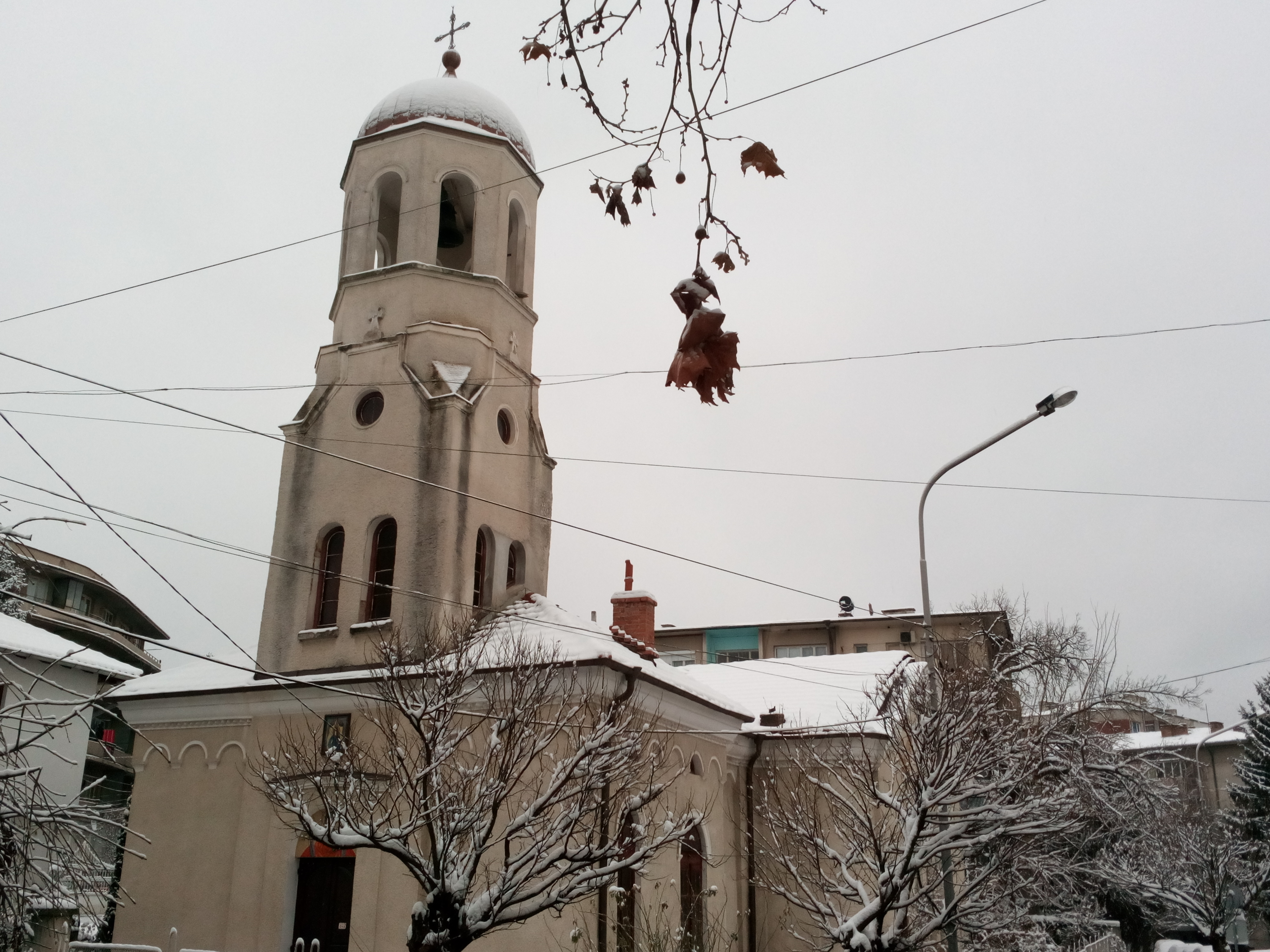
Saint Marina Church

==== Holy Forty Martyrs church ====
The church of the 40 martyrs of Sebaste was built and painted by the Bulgarian ruler Ivan Asen II in honor of the great victory of the Bulgarians at Klokotnitsa. In the 13th-14th centuries it was the main church of the Great Lavra Monastery, located at the foot of Tsarevets on the left bank of the river Yantra. The church hosts the tomb of Serbian archbishop Sava Nemanjic; he died there during his visit to tsar Asen

, returning from his second trip to the Holy land.

==== Church of St Demetrius of Thessaloniki ====
The rebellion of the brothers Asen and Peter against the Byzantines, which led to the restoration of the Bulgarian state in 1186, was announced in this church.

==== Church of Saints Peter and Paul ====
In the Church of Saints Peter and Paul the relics of St. John of Polivotsky were transferred to the church by Tsar Kaloyan in the capital city of Turnovo in 1204. Subsequently, a monastery complex was formed around the church. It was built according to the will and priesthood of Anna-Maria (1221–1237), wife of Tsar Ivan Assen II. During the Ottoman rule, hundreds of manuscripts from the royal library were placed there. Many of them were destroyed in 1842 by the Greek ruler.

==== Patriarchal Cathedral ====
The Patriarchal Church was restored and completed in 1981 to mark 1300 years since the foundation of the Bulgarian state under the plan of Arch. Boyan Kuzupov. The interior decoration is the work of the artist Theophanes Sokerov. The murals were completed in 1985.

==== Church of Saint George ====
The church dates from the late Middle Ages and was painted by Greek artists. It was reconstructed in the 17th century when Gavril was Metropolitan of Veliko Tarnovo.

==== Church of Saints Constantine and Helena ====
Church of Saints Constantine and Helena is the last church build by Kolyu Ficheto.

==== The Cathedral Church Nativity of the Mother of God ====
The Cathedral Church Nativity of the Mother of God is an Orthodox church in Veliko Tarnovo. It is located in the old part of Veliko Tarnovo, in the so-called "Bolyarska mahala", on a small square in the old part of the city. It was built on the old church of the Nativity of the Mother of God. Opposite it is the building of the Metropolitan of Veliko Tarnovo. Metropolitans Clement, Sophronius and Antim are buried in the porch of the church.

==== Church Saint Nikolay ====
According to legal practice, this temple was built on the basis of a government decree and the benevolence of the then Bishop Hilarion the Cretan. Kolyo Ficheto / then still a young master / took part in its construction. Above the south church door there is a text in Greek and Bulgarian, which tells about the situation in which the church "St. Nicholas" was built. It says that the permit was issued by Ilarion Tarnovski. Saint Nicholas to seek blessings from the Lord for all people. Year 1836. It is assumed that this epigraphic monument was probably erected in 1849, after the great earthquake.

=== Architecture ===
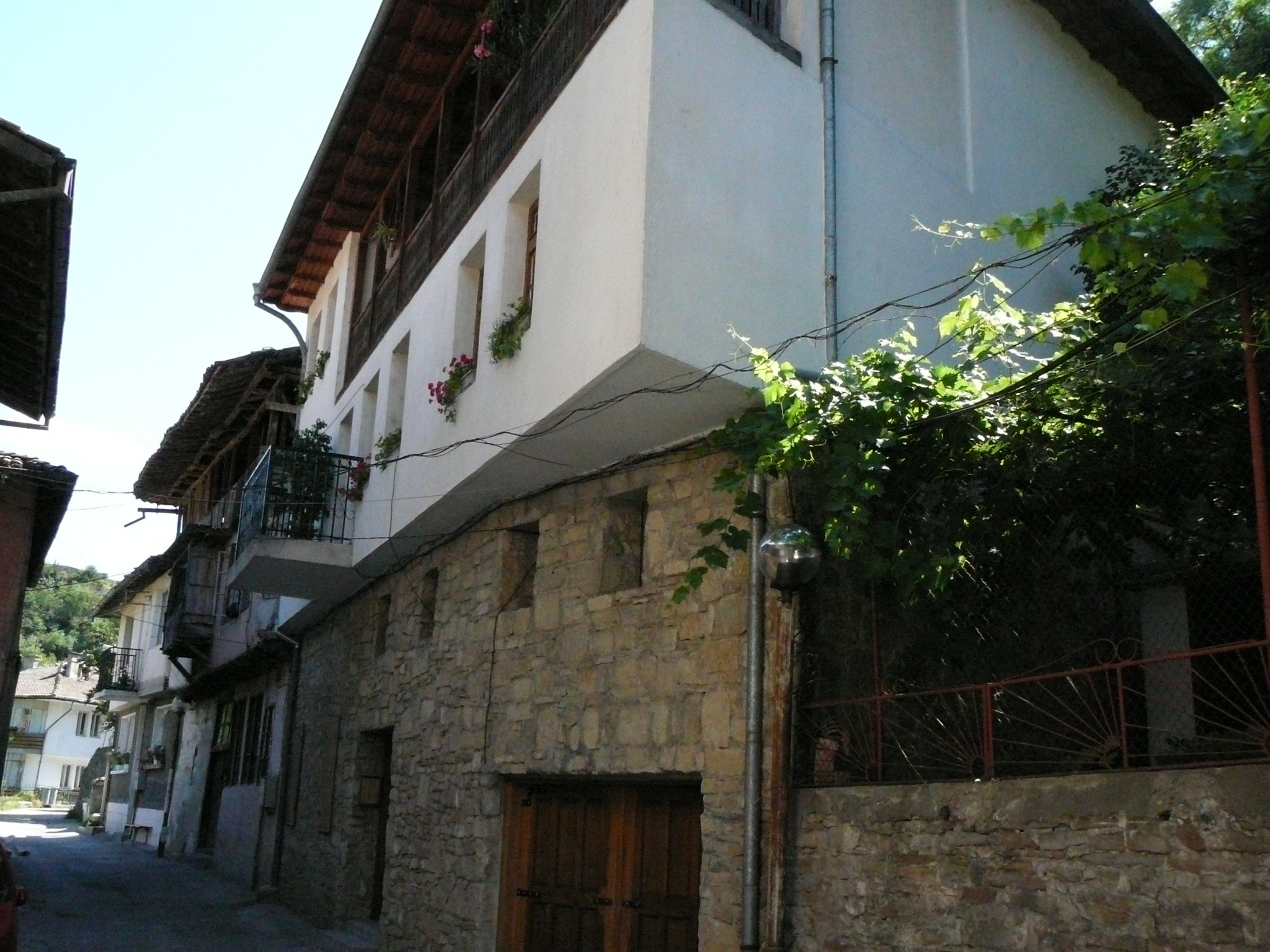

In Veliko Tarnovo you can see fragments and foundations that are part of the architecture of the Second Bulgarian State. In the old part of the city and Asenova Mahala there can be seen Churches and houses that were dated through the Ottoman rule. In the whole old part, houses from the Renaissance era were built. Characteristic of them are the ornate elements. Baroque architecture can be seen in most of the public buildings built in the early 20th century. In the central and the new part there are public buildings and residential buildings built in Baroque, Stalin Baroque style and Modernist style.

=== Regular Events ===
- The annual celebrations of the Veliko Tarnovo celebration, celebrated on 22 March
- International Folklore Festival
- The celebration of the declaration of the Independence of Bulgaria on 22 September
- Fest "Balkan Folk"
- The "Stage of the Ages" Festival in August, with the openings of Tsarevets

=== Monuments ===
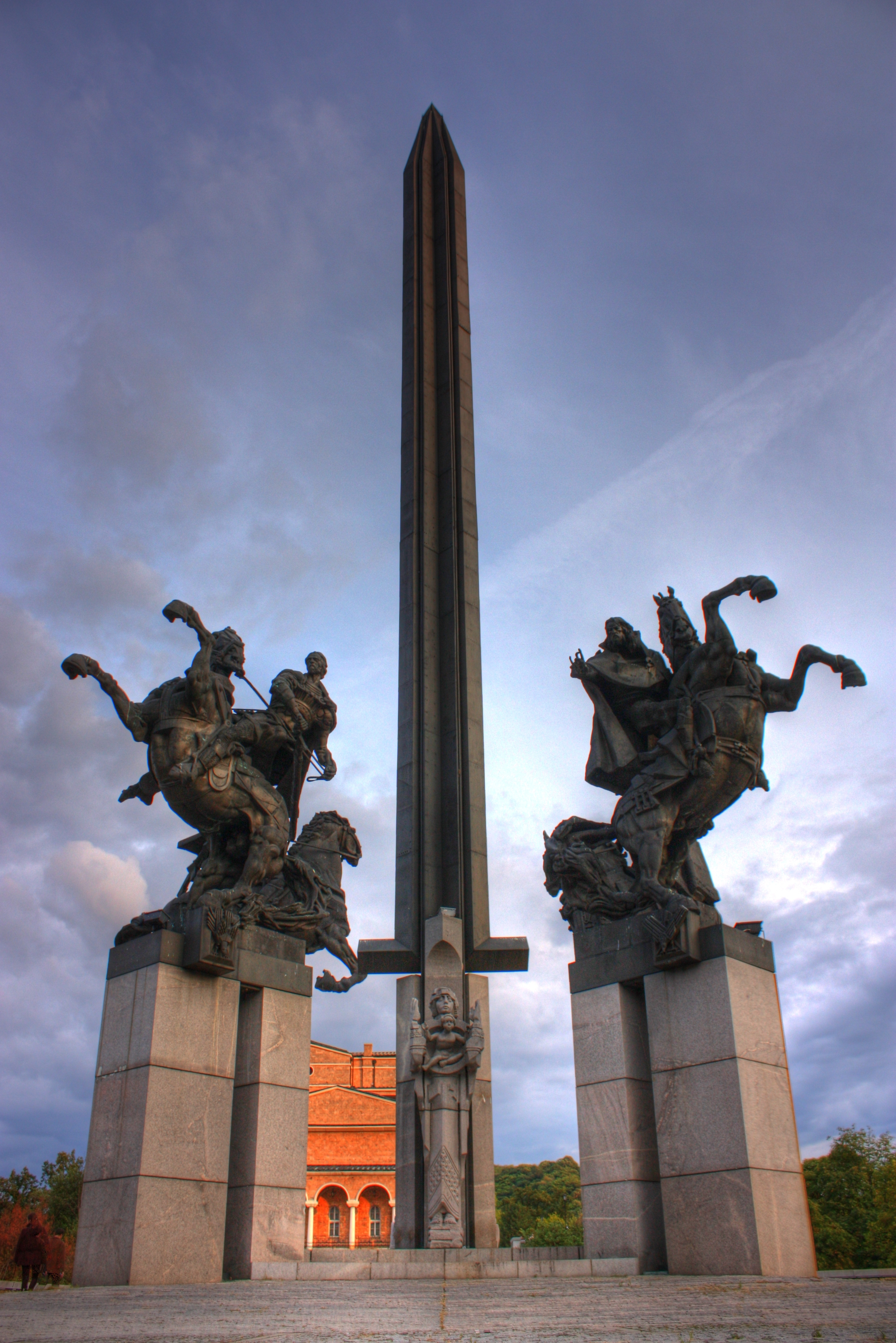
The Monument of Asenevci

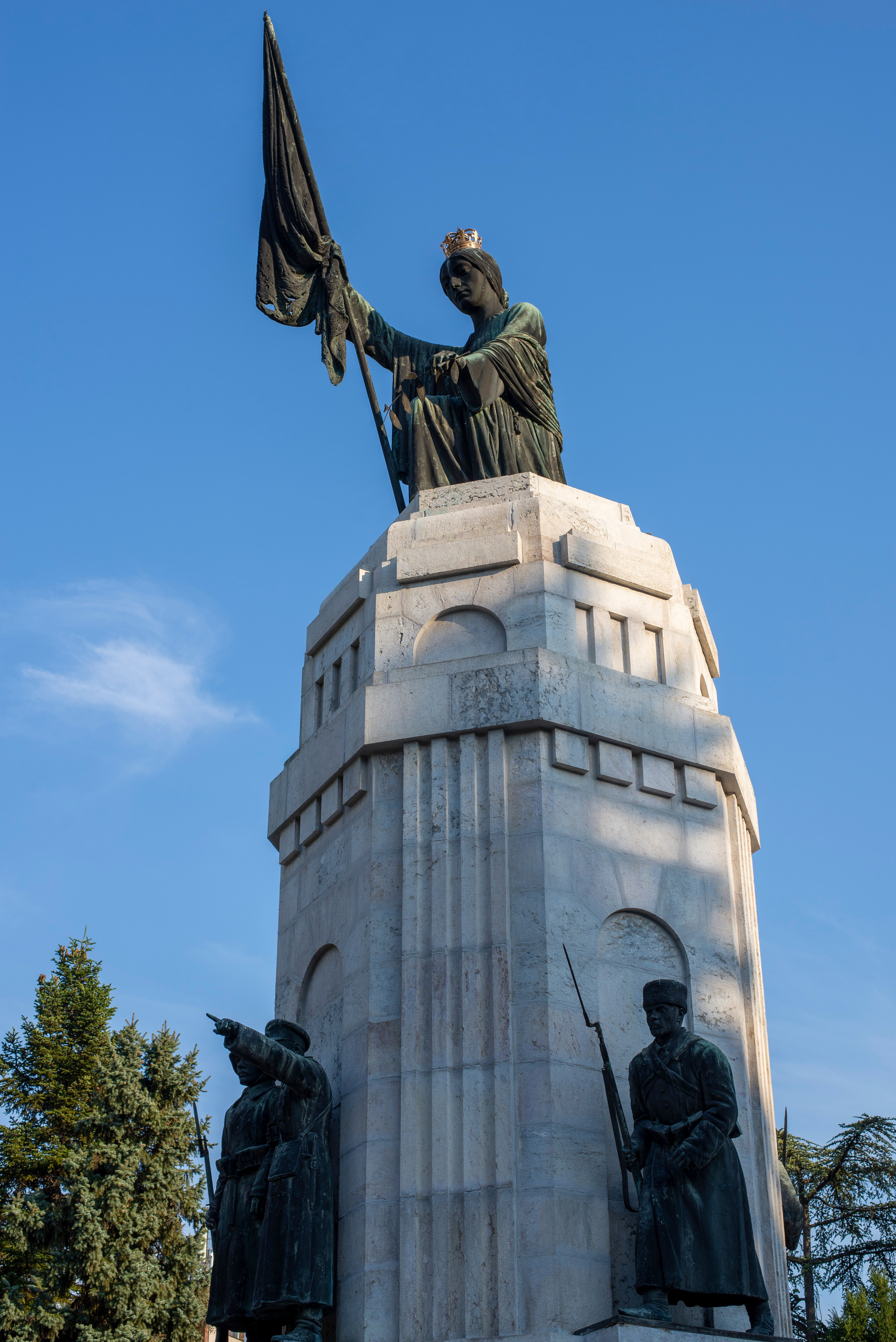
Monument Mother Bulgaria

- Monument to the Asen Dynasty (built in 1985)
- Monument of Mother Bulgaria (built in 1930)
- Monument of Independence
- Monument of Vasil Levski
- Monument of Stefan Stambolov
- Monument of Nikola Pickolo
- Monument of Todor Lefterov
- Monument of Hristo Ivanov
- Monument Velchova Zavera
- Monument of Nikola Gabrovski and Dimitar Blagoev
- Monument of Ivan Semerdzhiev

=== Dates connected to the town ===
- March 22 - Veliko Tarnovo's national holiday
- July 7 - liberation of Veliko Tarnovo
- April 16 - signature of the Tarnovo Constitution
- September 22 - Declaration of Independence of Bulgaria
- October 26 - Declaration of Independence of the Second Bulgarian State

== Media ==
=== Newspapers ===
The first newspaper in Tarnovo was printed during the middle of the 19th century. The first issue of the Tarnovo humorous newspaper "Draca" was published on 8 October 1884. In 1900, the first newspaper devoted to theater art – "Tarnovski Theatre".

- Regional newspaper "Borba"
- Regional newspaper "Yantra dnes"

=== Radios ===
- Radio channel "Veliko Tarnovo"
- Radio channel "Favorit"

=== Television ===
- Regional television "Evrokom Tsarevets"
- Regional television "Videosat"

== Health ==
Health care in Veliko Tarnovo is both public and private. In Veliko Tarnovo, there exist both a multidisciplinary hospital and a medical college.

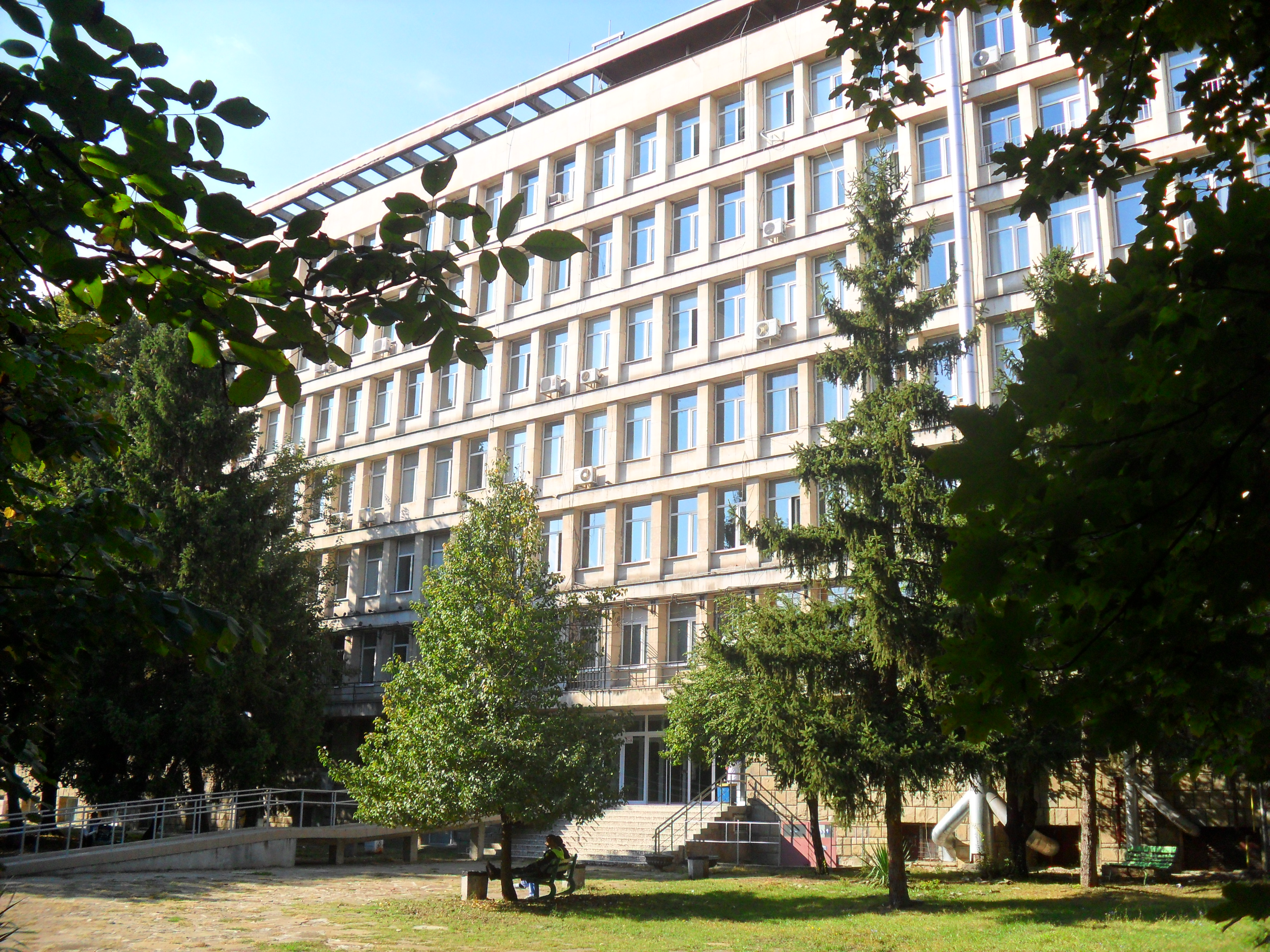
Stefan Cherkezov, hospital Veliko Tarnovo, named after Stefan Cherkezov

At the moment, there is no accurate information as to whether or not there were any medical establishments in the Second Bulgarian Empire (1185-1396). Many scientists mention that there were folk healers in the area: Hekimi, Jerahi, Billerie, Akhtari, Znahari, Bayachki, who mostly treated injuries and diseases with herbs and other traditional medicine Dr. Marko Pavlov, the founder of the pharmacy business in Bulgaria, arrived in Tarnovo in 1822. A year later, he opened the first pharmacy called Lekarnya (Bulgarian: Лекарня) in the city, which is located in a shop opposite the Constituent Assembly Building. In 1854, a second pharmacy was opened in the town by Yanaki Zlatev and Dr. Margarit. Hadji Mincho Hadjistanov took the initiative to raise funds for the construction of a hospital. In 1854 the first hospital in the Tarnovo and Bulgaria was opened. Initially, the hospital was housed in several small buildings. Mikhail Kefalov bequeathed part of his property to build a large hospital building at the end of the city. Since the beginning of the twentieth century, the hospital has been called Prince Boris State Hospital. On September 15, 1950 the Medical College for Medical Assistants and Medical Officers was opened. Dr. Varban Genchev.

== Transport ==
Veliko Tarnovo is a main transport center in Bulgaria. The main road from Romania to Middle East passes through the city.

=== Automobile ===
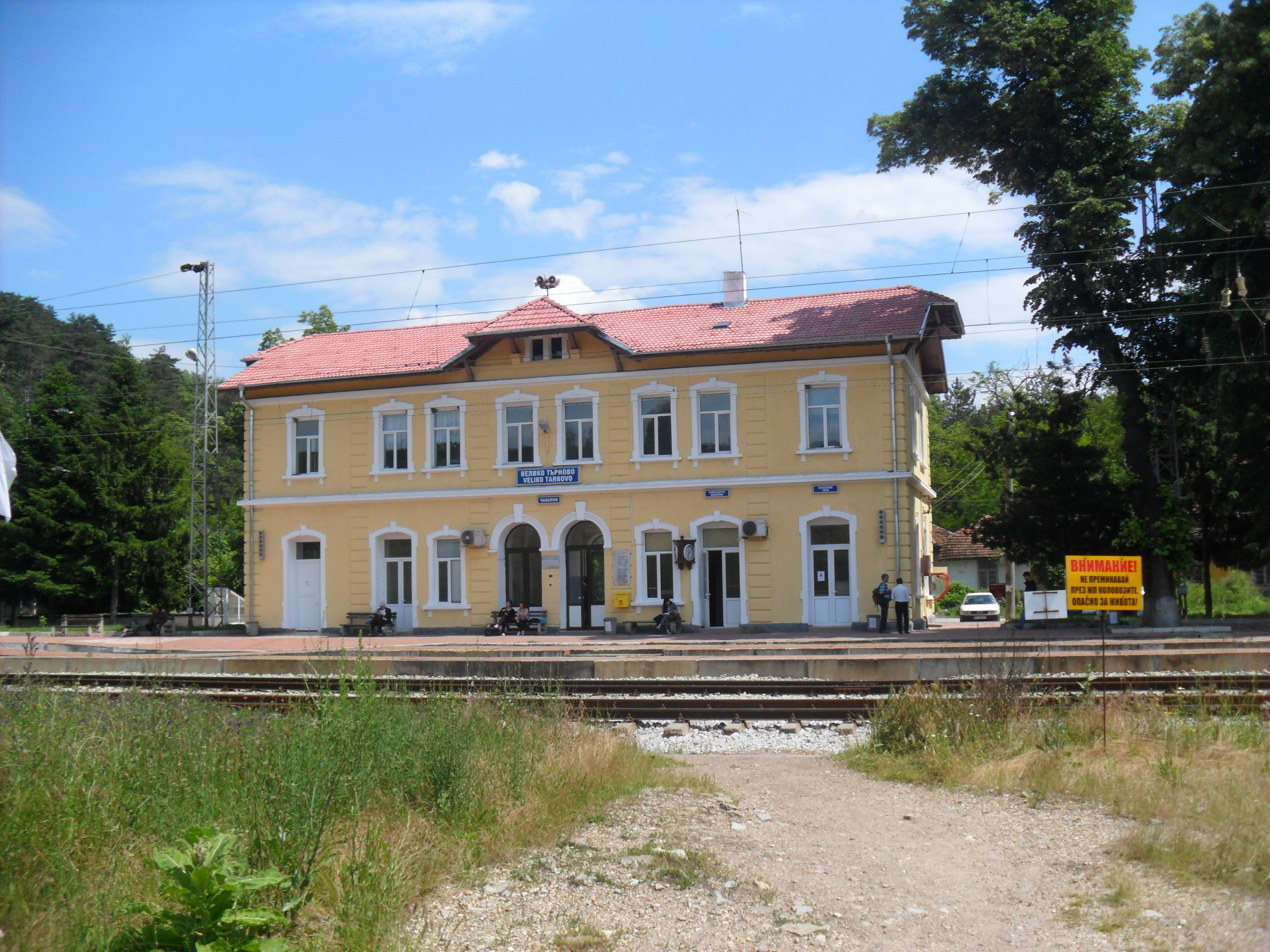
Rail Station

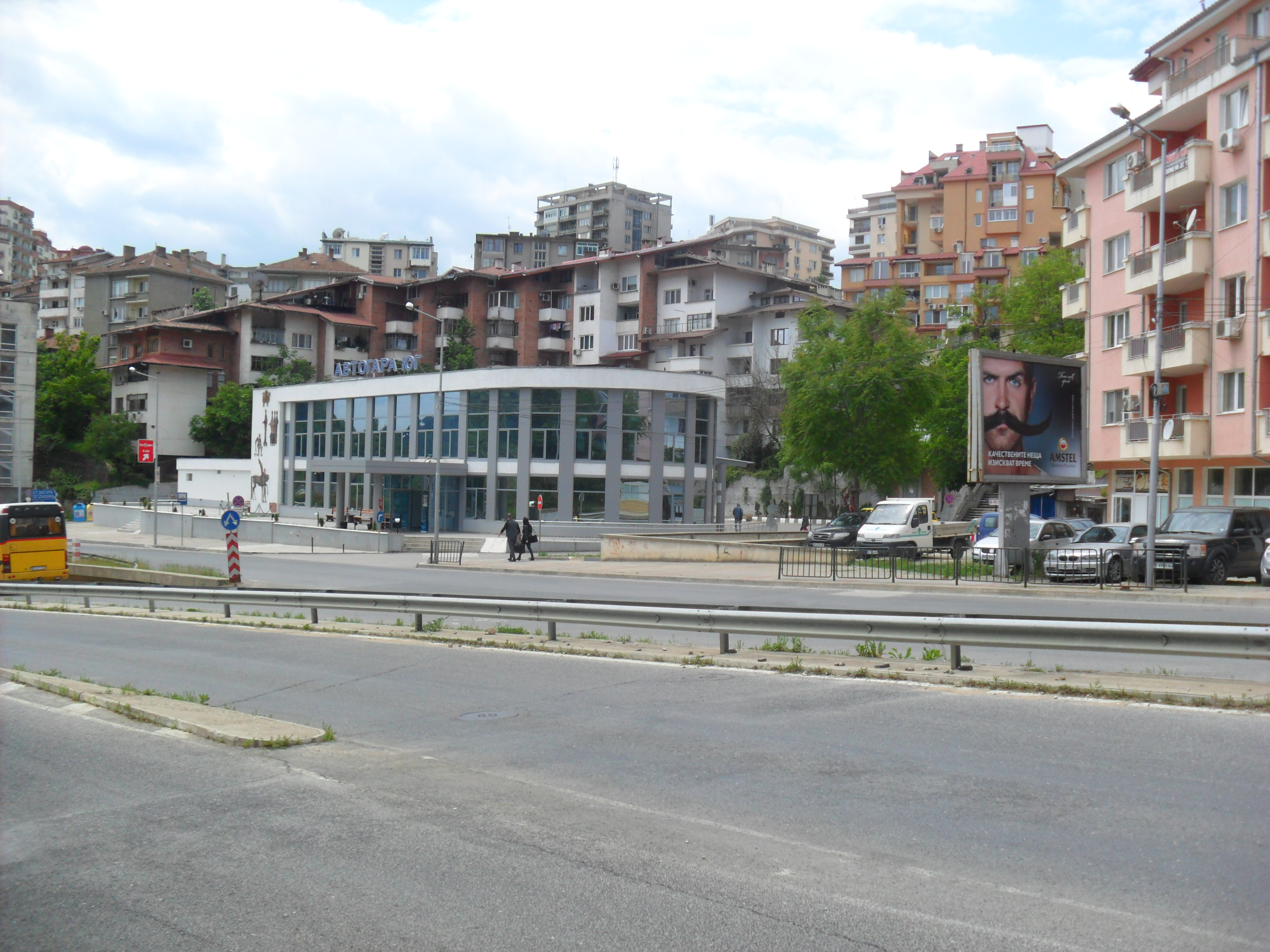
Bus station

In Veliko Tarnovo two main roads cross each other: Varna - Sofia and Rousse - Stara Zagora. The most important traffic roads are South road junction (constructed in 2000) and Western road junction (constructed in 1978). The city has two bus stations.

=== Rail transport ===
Through passes the main railway Rousse - Stara Zagora. The Central rail station was built in 1900.

== Tourism ==
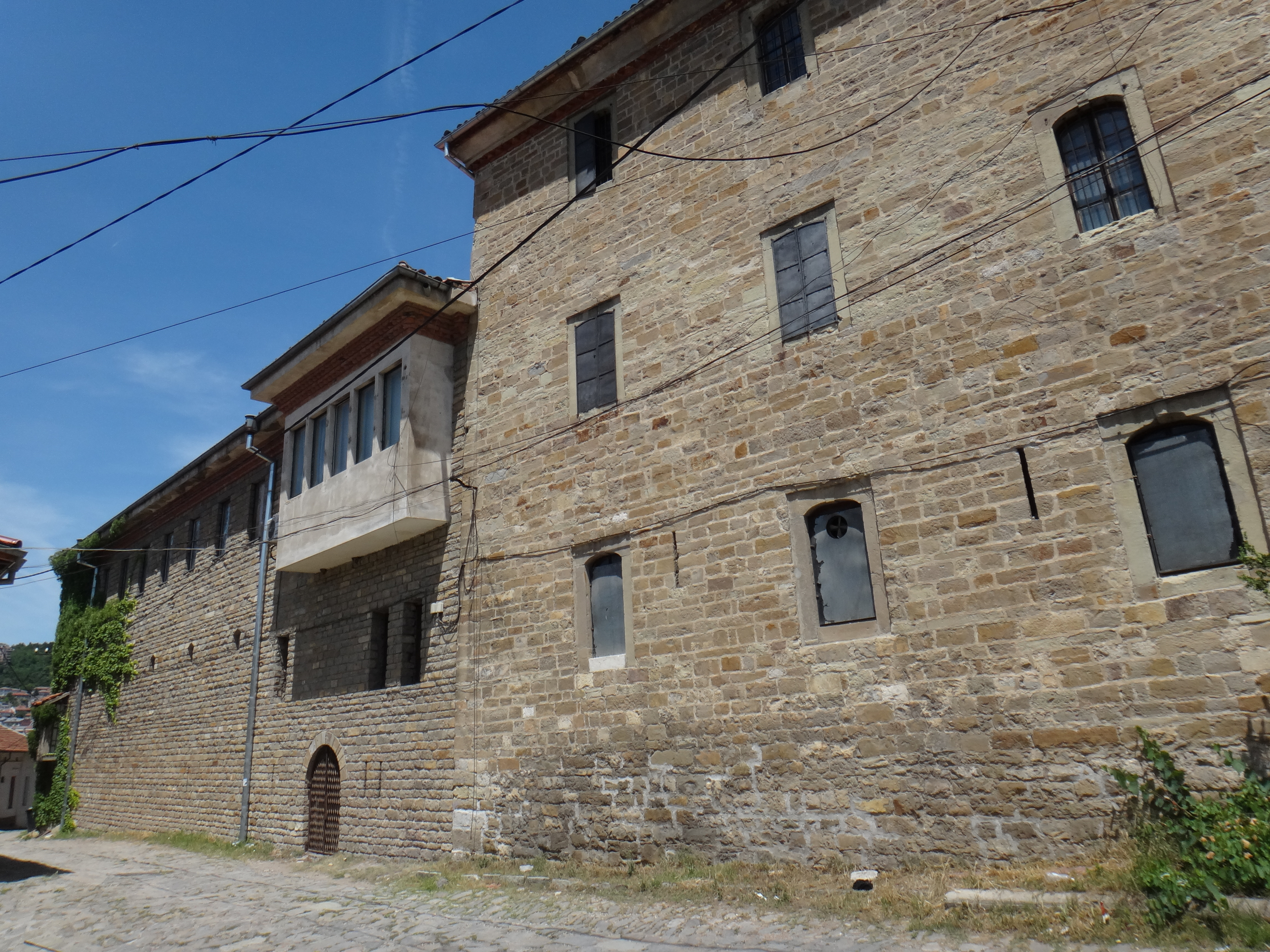
Museum Zatvor

In 2013, 450,000 tourists visited the city. The most popular landmark is the historic hill Tsarevets, which held the capital of the Second Bulgarian Empire. A number of other sites also attract tourists, including the historic hill Trapezitza, the Samovodska Charshiya, numerous medieval and Bulgarian Renaissance churches, and the ancient Roman fortress of Nicopolis ad Istrum.

=== Museums ===
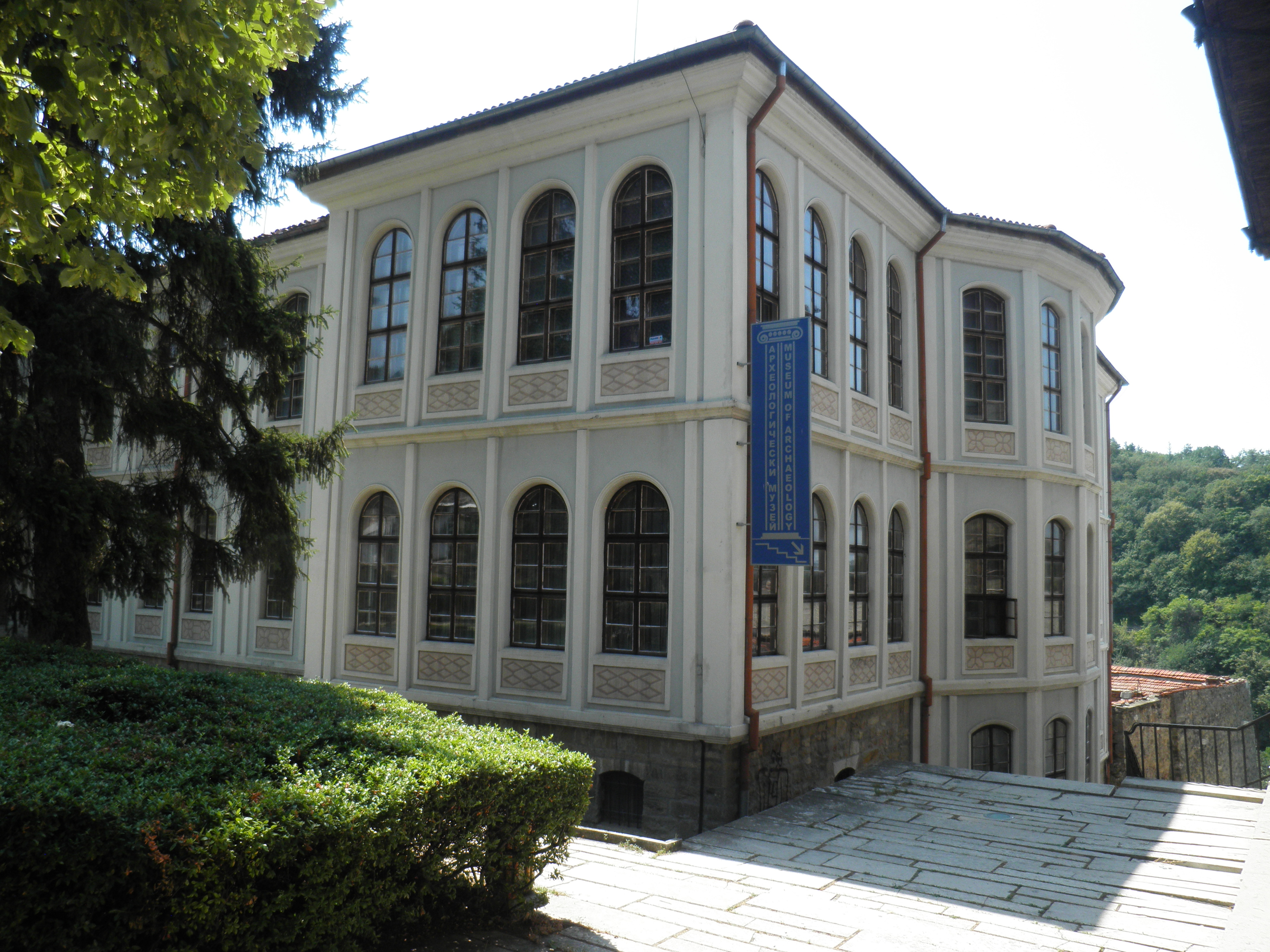

In the city are located the architectural reserves Tsarevets, Trapezitsa and Momina krepost. The Regional historical museum in the town was established in 1871. In the town are located the House Museum of the Bulgarian writers Petko Rachov Slaveykov and House Museum of the writer Emilian Stanev. Next to the Regional Library is located the Archaeological Museum.

- Museum "Revival and Constituent Assembly"
- Museum "New and New History"
- Museum Zatvor
- Museum "Sarafkin House"
- Museum of Wax Figures.

=== Samovodska charshya ===
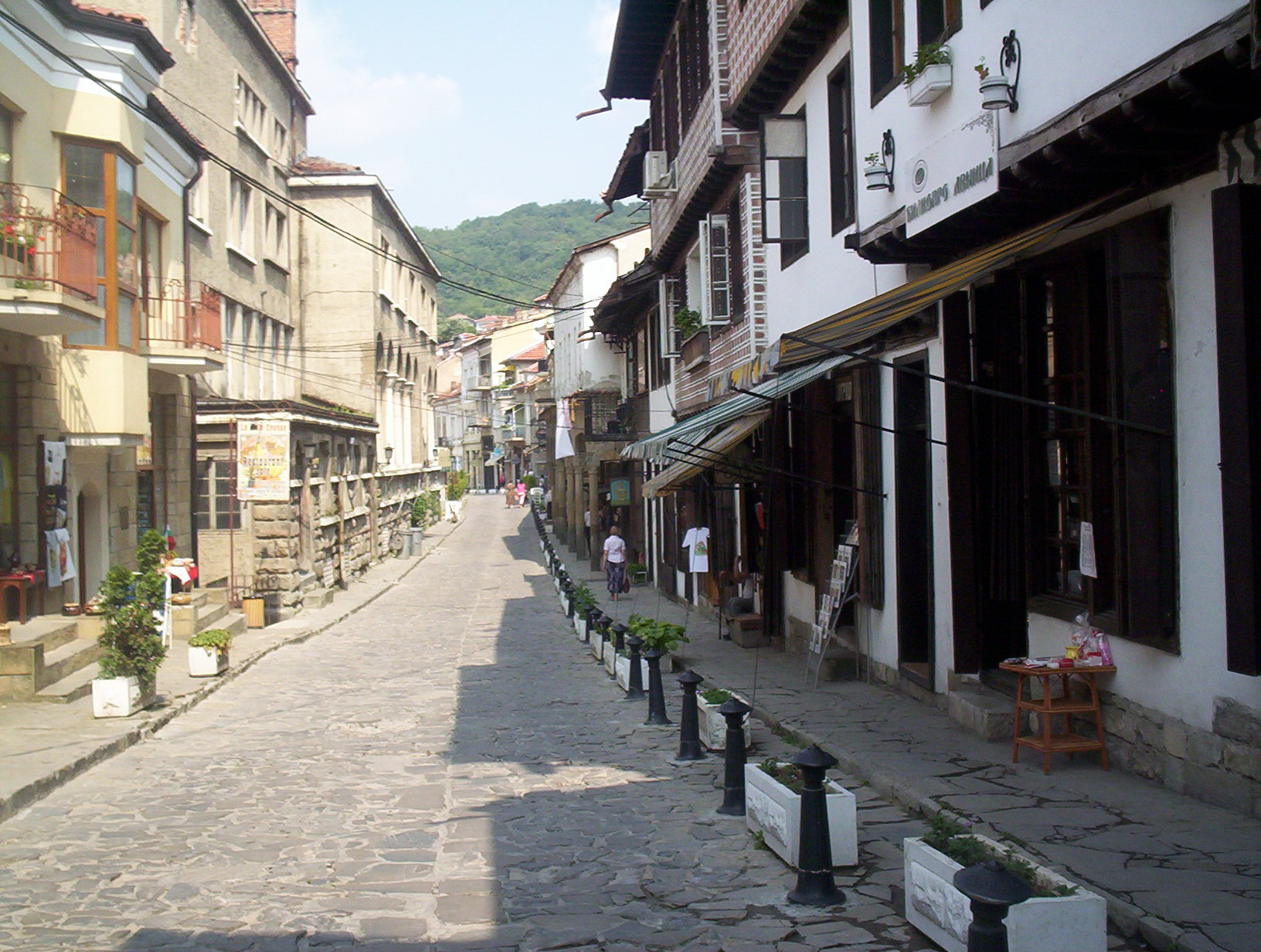

The Samovodska charshia developed as a business center during the Bulgarian revival. They are there many craft shops, which have preserved a centuries-old tradition of craftsmanship.

=== Gurko Street ===
Gurko Street is one of the most picturesque streets in the old town. It is named in memory of the Russian General Iosif Vladimirovich Romeyko-Gurko. As commander of the Forward Force of the Imperial Russian Army in the Russo-Turkish War (1877–1878) he liberated Tarnovo on 7 July 1877 (another street in the city is named "The 7th of July"). General Gurko is commemorated with a bust in the Marno Pole Park in the city center. Annually on that date he is celebrated with an official honour guard by cadets from the city's National Military University and the local branch of the "Traditsiya" ("Tradition") Historical Society re-enacts the event.

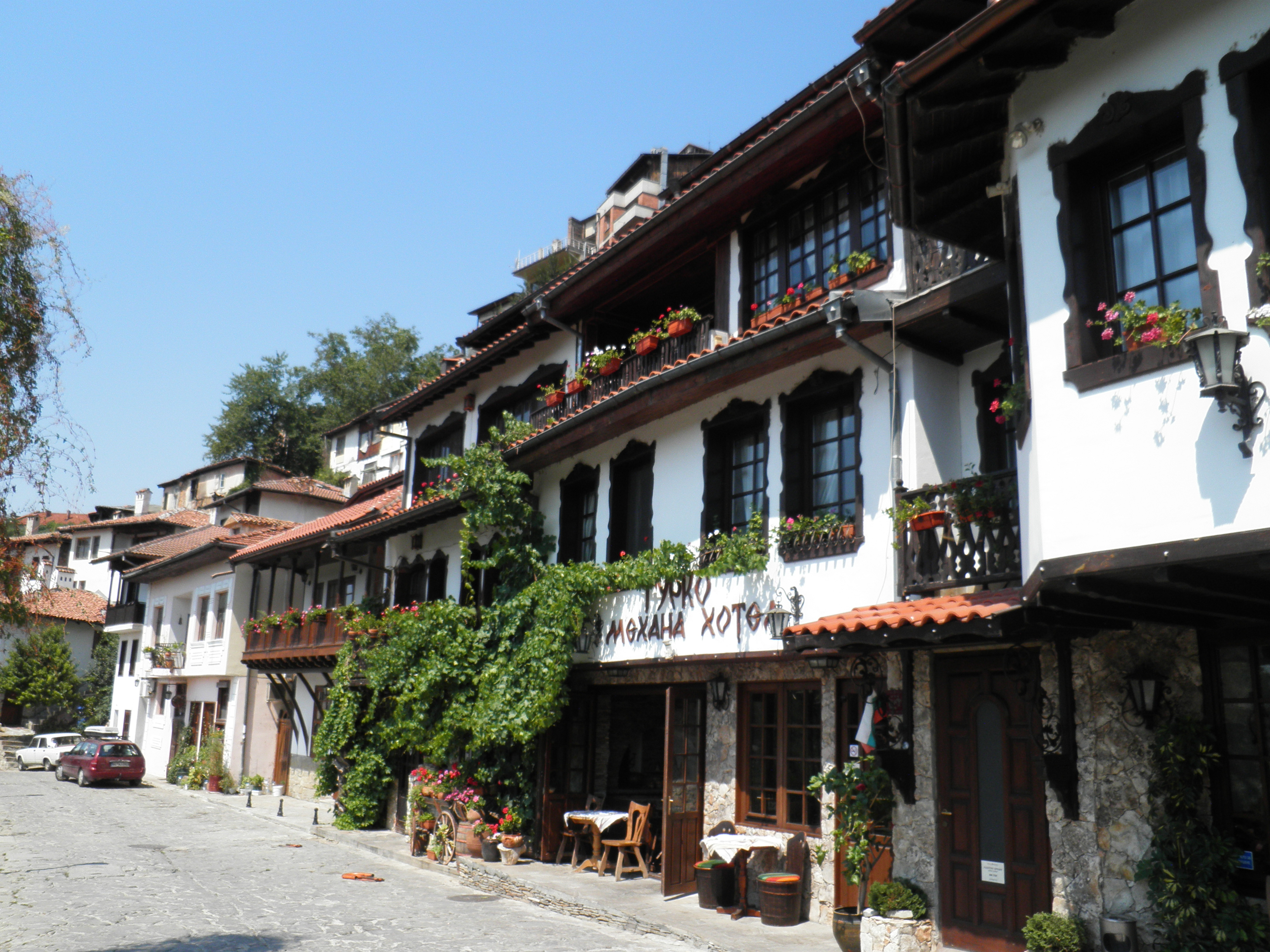

=== Bridges ===
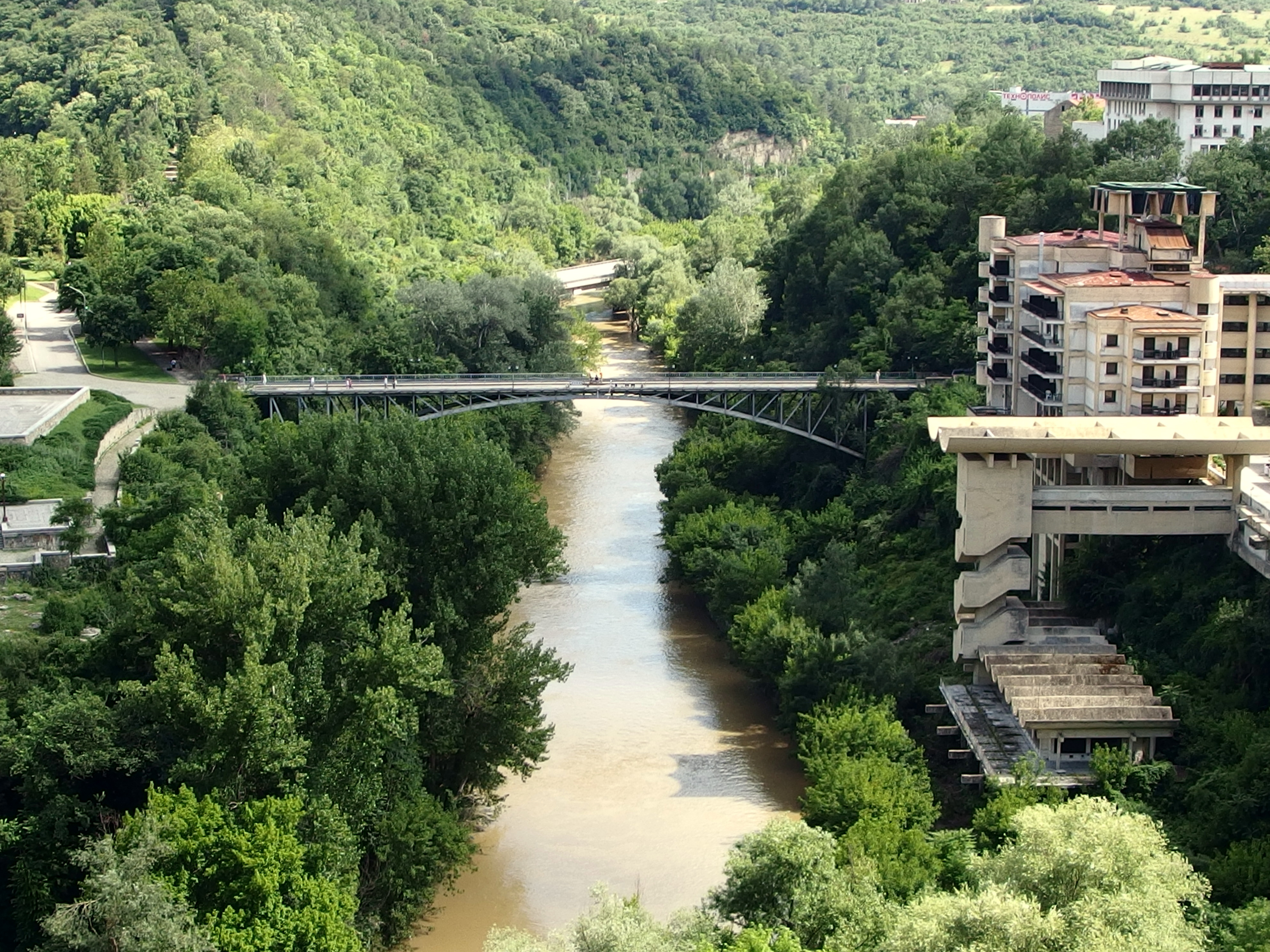
Stambolov bridge

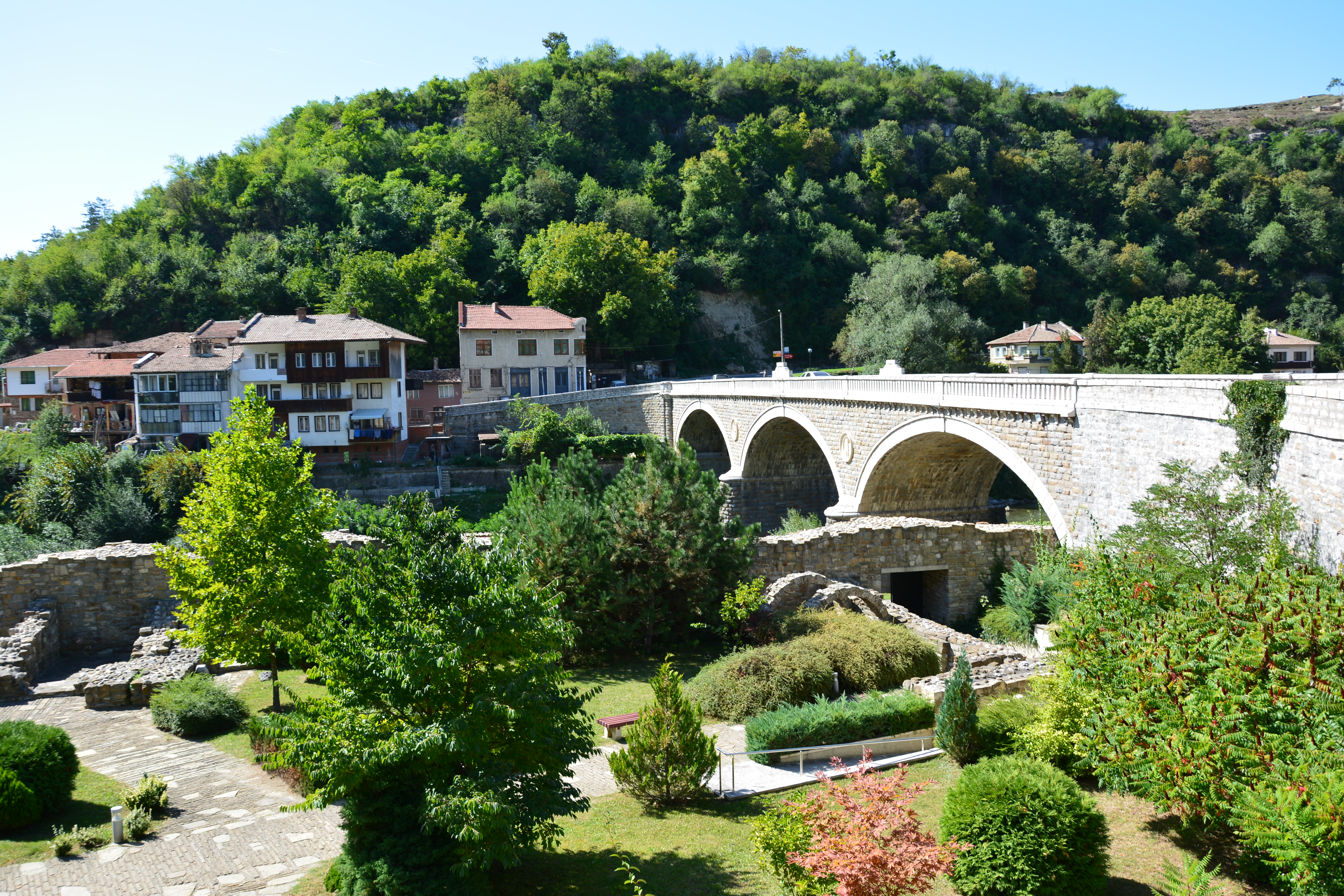
Stone bridge

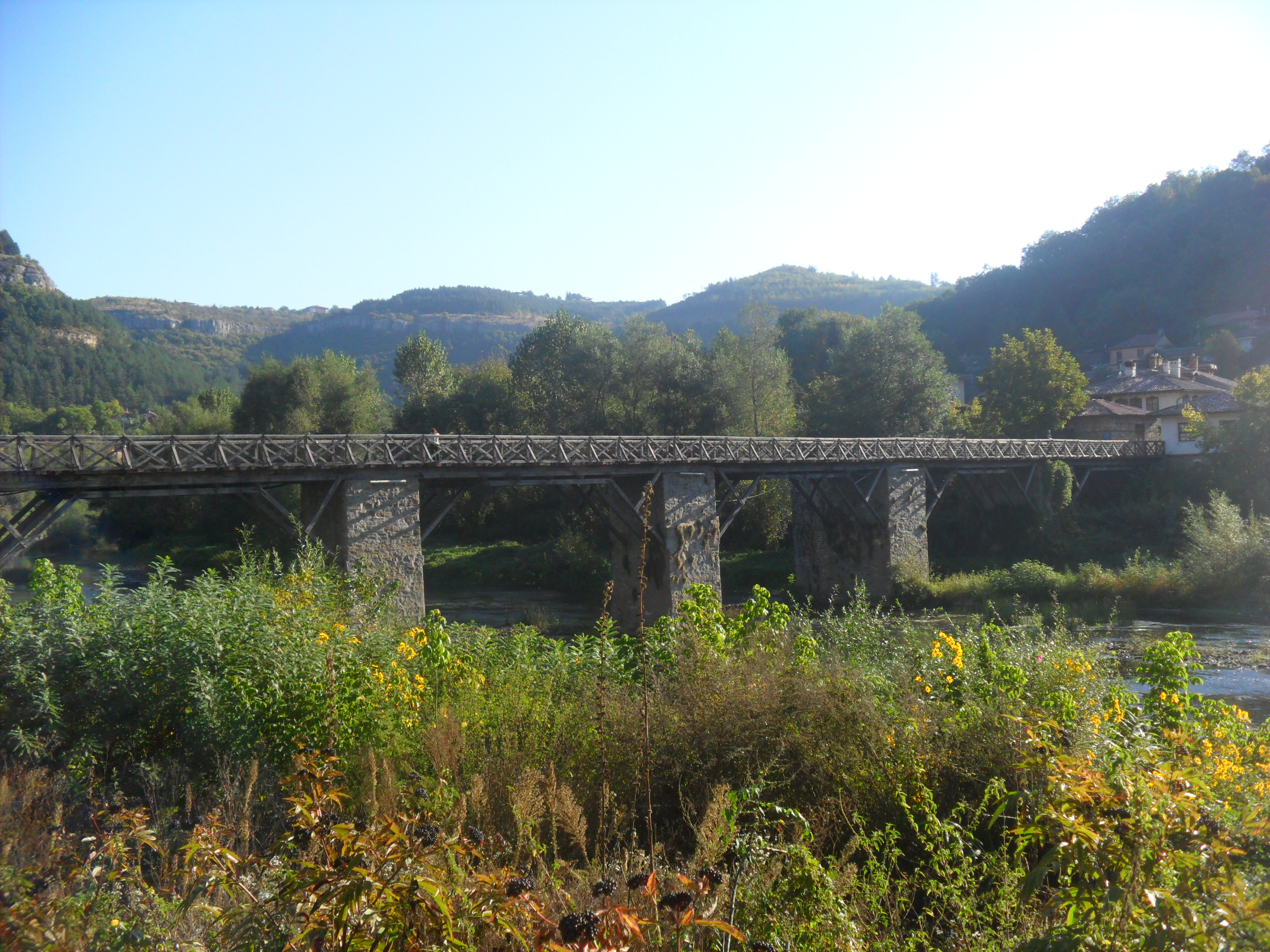
Bishop's bridge

The Stambolov bridge is an arch bridge, designed by an Italian architect, Giovanni Musutti (also the designer of the Monument to Vasil Levski). It was constructed in 1897. Bishop's (Vladishki's) bridge is the oldest bridge in the town, built around the 1800s in Asenova mahava (Old town). The King's bridge (also known as Stone bridge) was constructed in 1930 in Asenova mahala, as a connection to Veliko Tarnovo - Gorna Oryahovitsa.

=== Cafes, pubs and eating houses ===
The Red Café and the Tabashko Café were among the most famous in the city in the late 19th and early 20th centuries. They offered coffee of several types. Pubs were one of the main places where socio-political life was shared. In addition to various types of alcoholic beverages, various types of games were played in them and some of them turned into casinos in the evening. Famous pubs in Tarnovo were "Pri Gornaka", "Pri Shumelata" and "Pri Rusevcheto".

=== Inns ===
Tarnovgrad has been an important craft and administrative center for centuries. Important roads passed through the city from east to west and north to south. During the Renaissance, there were 42 khans in the city and 72 were reached by the Liberation. One of the largest inns in the city is the one of Inn of Hajji Nicoli and restored by American patron Edmont Beck. Another masterpiece of Renaissance architecture is the Stambolov khan built in the 1940s by Stefan Stambolov's father - Nikola Stambolov. Other notable inns were the Dryanovo inn today, where the Modern Theater cinema was built in 1901, the Bala Bona's inn again on the Samovodskaya Charshia the Tarnovo inn (called before the Turkish inn), located under Tsarevets, the Grand inn, also known as the Arnautski or Sinjir inn, located near the Korshum Mosque, the Abadji inn, and others.

== Economy ==
The city is separated to 4 Industrial zones: Central, North, South and West.

=== Plastic ===
Veliko Tarnovo is the biggest producer of plastic bags in Bulgaria.

=== Drinks ===
The main brewery in the city was established in 1897. Today it is called Bolyarka AD and is located in the Central industrial zone. It was a leading national brand in the 1960s and 1970s. The Pepsi soft drinks plant in the Central industrial zone produces drinks for Bulgaria and for export to the Balkans.

== International relations ==
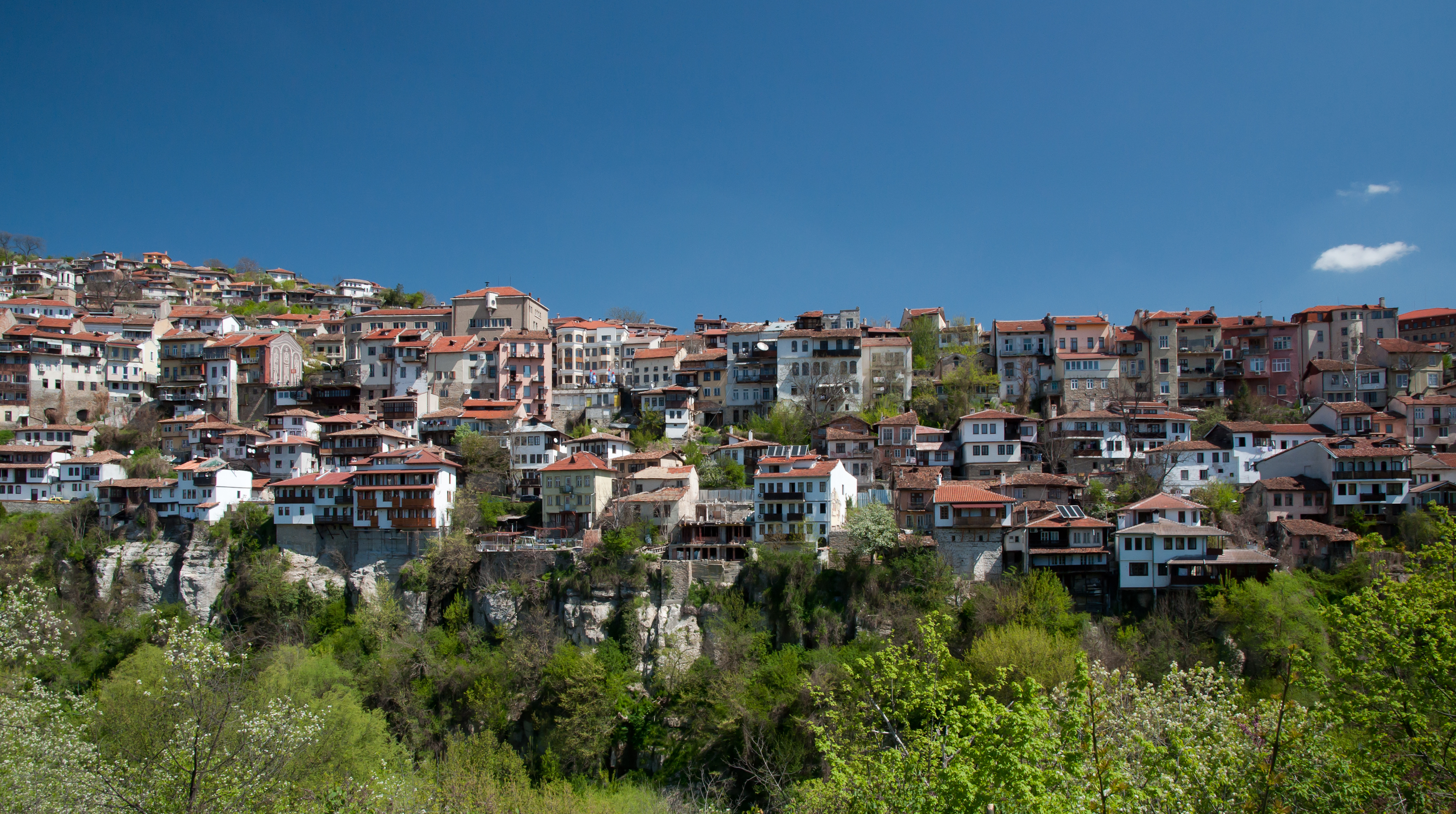
The Varosha quarter

=== Twin towns – Sister cities ===
Veliko Tarnovo is twinned with:

- Vagharshapat, Armenia
- Nakhchivan, Azerbaijan
- Xi'an, China
- Asti, Italy
- Ferrara, Italy
- Bayonne, France
- Bitola, North Macedonia
- Cetinje, Montenegro
- Colonia Tovar, Venezuela
- Iaşi, Romania
- Kraków, Poland
- Niš, Serbia
- Ohrid, North Macedonia
- Maebashi, Japan
- Poltava, Ukraine
- Serres, Greece
- Tarxien, Malta
- Zadar, Croatia
- Opava, Czech Republic
- Toledo, Spain
- Tver, Russia
- Zugló, Hungary
- Al-Karak, Jordan

== Honour ==
Tarnovo Ice Piedmont on Livingston Island in the South Shetland Islands, Antarctica is named after Veliko Tarnovo.

== Sport ==
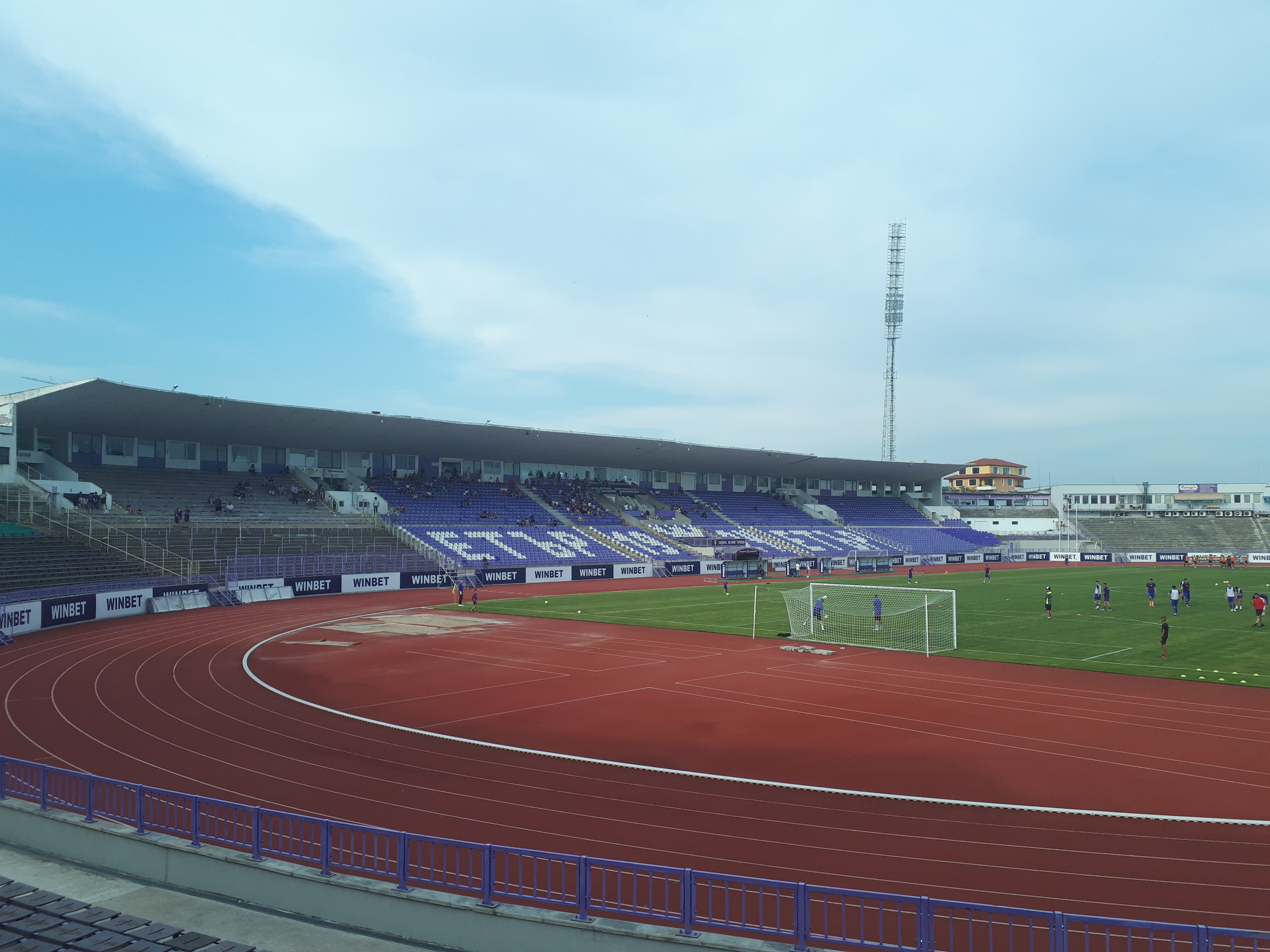
Ivaylo Stadium

The youth sports club in Tarnovo was founded in 1921. The first football matches in the town were played at the Kolodrum stadium in the area of the Old Military School, the Academic and Marno Pole fields. Ivaylo Stadium is the biggest football stadium in the city. The stadium is home of all the sports teams in Veliko Tarnovo which are called Etar, as in 2003's Press Conference. Ground was broken for the stadium in 1957 and it was completed in 1958. It has been rebuilt in the 21st century and now has seats for 18,000. Veliko Tarnovo has teams in football, basketball, volleyball, handball, athletics and other sports.

- FC Etar 1924 Veliko Tarnovo – football team

The Vasil Levski Palace of Culture and Sports is the biggest sports hall in Veliko Tarnovo. The hall was completed on 15 November 1985. The hall has 1600 seats and courts for basketball and volleyball.

The sport is also represented by volleyball teams - Tsarevets 19, archery, compound and crossbow - club "Etar-78"(known by their excellent skills of activity and precision into shooting, climbing, mountaineering and extreme sports - "Tsarevets", handball - "Etar-64", basketball - " Etar-49 ", ice hockey -" Etro-92 "and chess -" Tsarevets ", volleyball - Tsarevets 1919.
