= Hikmat (name) =

Hikmat is a masculine given name and surname of Arabic origin. It has some variants such as Hikmet and Hekmat. Notable people with the name include:

== Given name ==
=== Hekmat ===
- Hekmat Karzai, Afghan diplomat and academic

=== Hikmat ===
- Hikmat Mizban Ibrahim al-Azzawi (1933–2012), Iraqi politician
- Hikmat Dib, Lebanese politician
- Hikmat Hasanov (born 1975), Azerbaijani military officer
- Hikmat Hashimov (born 1979), Uzbek football player
- Hikmat al-Hijri (born 1965), Syrian spiritual leader
- Hikmat al-Hiraki (1886–1969), Syrian statesman
- Hikmat Mizban Ibrahim (1933–2012), Iraqi politician
- Hikmat Kumar Karki (born 1964), Nepalese politician
- Hikmat Al Masri (1905–1994), Palestinian businessman and politician
- Hikmat Mirzayev (born 1968), Azerbaijani military officer
- Hikmat Muradov (1969–1991), Azerbaijani military hero
- Hikmat Ramdani (born 2001), Indonesian para badminton player
- Hikmat al-Shihabi (1931–2013), Syrian military officier
- Hikmat Sulayman (1889–1964), Iraqi politician
- Hikmat Udhan (born 1963), Indian politician
- Hikmat Singh Verma (1955/56–2021), Fiji Indian politician
- Hikmat Zaid (born 1945), Palestinian politician
- Hikmat Abu Zayd (1922–2011), Egyptian academic and politician
- Hikmat Ziya (1929–1995), Azerbaijani poet, translator, and children's writer

== Middle name ==
- Abdulqader Hikmat Sarhan (born 1987), Qatari taekwondo practitioner
- Ahmed Hikmat Shakir, Iraqi terrorist facilitator
- Sharif Hikmat Nashashibi, British journalist

== Surname ==
- Mohammad Ghani Hikmat (1929–2011), Iraqi sculptor and artist
- Taghreed Hikmat (born 1945), Jordanian judge
- Uki Noah, (birth name: Mohammad Kautsar Hikmat; born 1981), Indonesian guitarist

== Fictional character ==
- Hikmat, main character in the Egyptian movie Bint el-Basha el-Mudir
- Hikmat Palpatine, one of the characters in the American drama television series 24
