= Hikmat =

Hikmat (Arabic: حكمة, ḥikma, "wisdom") may refer to:

- Hikmat (name)
- Bait al Hikmat, main library at Hamdard University, Karachi, Pakistan
- Divani-hikmat, literary council of Azerbaijan
- Hikmah (also transliterated Hikmat) Islamic term meaning "wisdom" or underlying philosophy of an Islamic law

== See also ==
- Hikmet
