= Saint George Church, Veliko Tarnovo =

Church in Bulgaria

Saint George Church
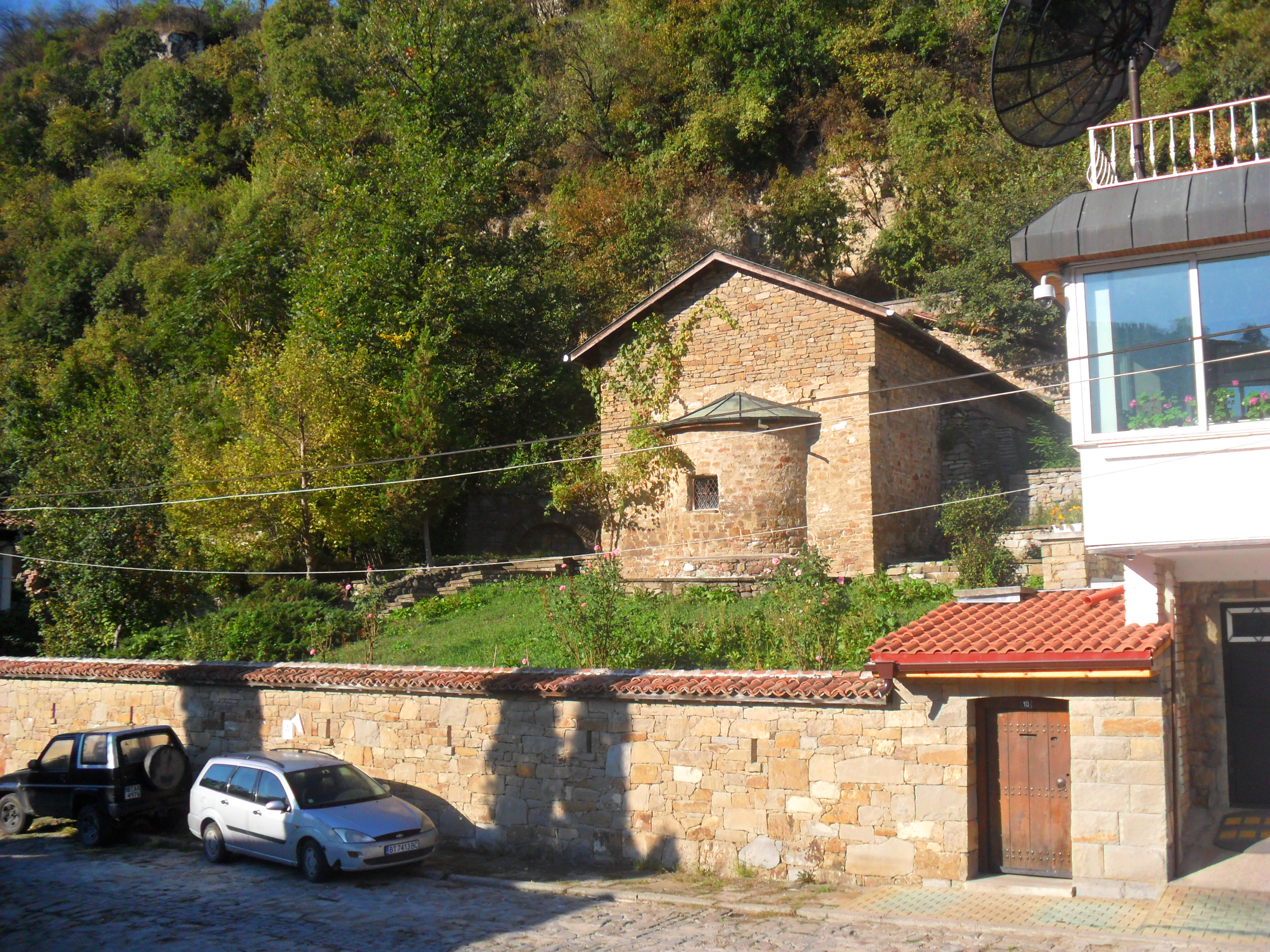
- Saint George Church
- 43°5′3″N 25°38′8″E
- Country: Bulgarian
- Denomination: Eastern Orthodox

The Saint George Church (Bulgarian: църква "Св. Георги", tsarkva "Sv.Georgi") is a medieval Eastern Orthodox church constructed in 1230 in the town of Veliko Tarnovo in Bulgaria, the former capital of the Second Bulgarian Empire.

It was built by the donor Kir Paraskev and his wife Irina. Above the entrance of the main part of the church is preserved an inscription in Greek. In the porch of the temple there are preserved remains of two picturesque layers. From the first, the "Creation of the World" and the figures of the prophet Elijah and the Old Testament righteous Enoch have survived. In the second spelling, the theme of the Last Judgment is illustrated. The conservation and restoration of the temple was carried out in the period 1968 - 1971 according to a project by architect Boyan Kuzupov.
