= Entering heaven alive =

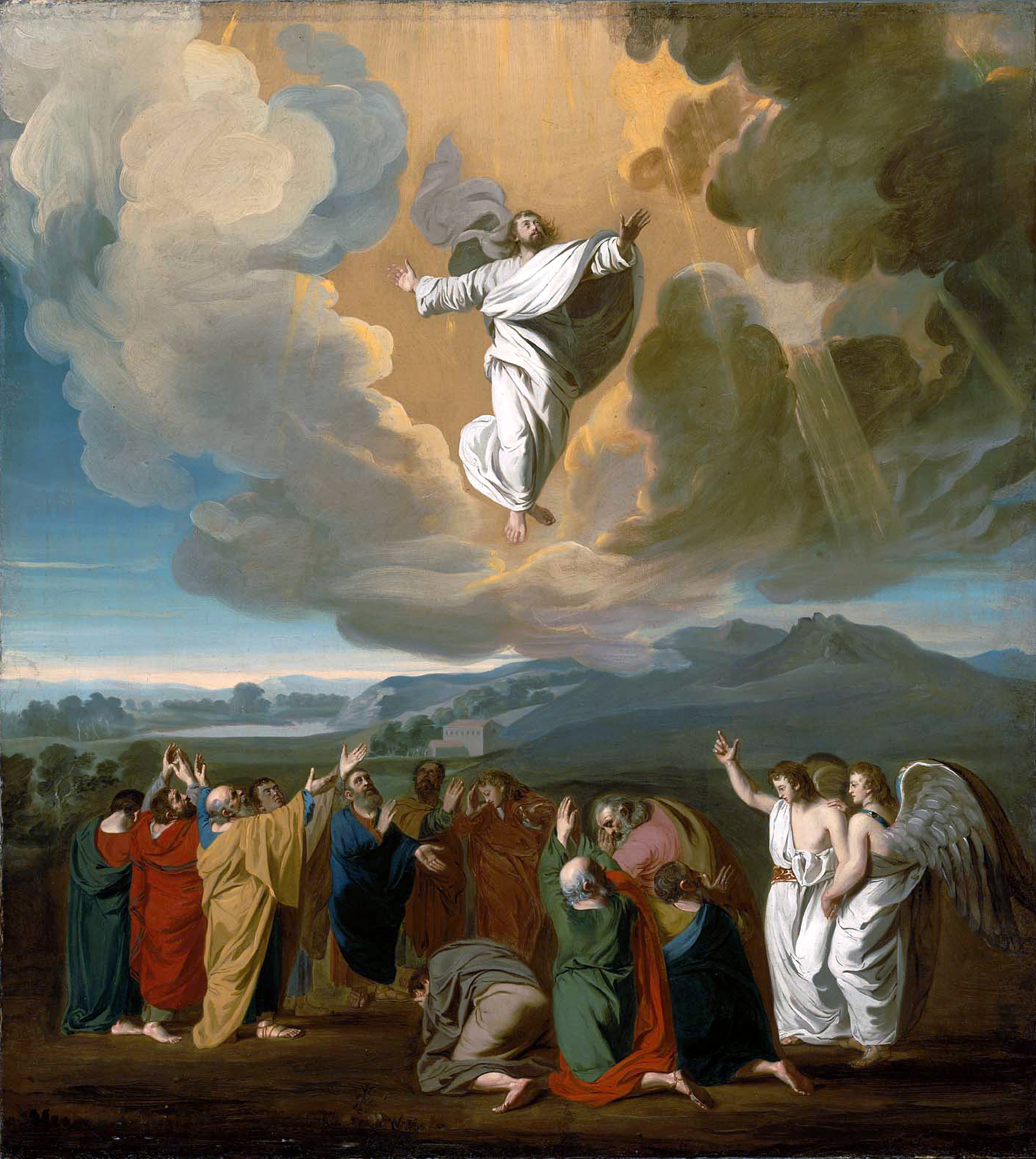
Ascension of Jesus, by John Singleton Copley. Christians believe that Jesus ascended into heaven after his death on the cross and resurrection. In Islam, it is believed that he ascended to heaven without dying at all.

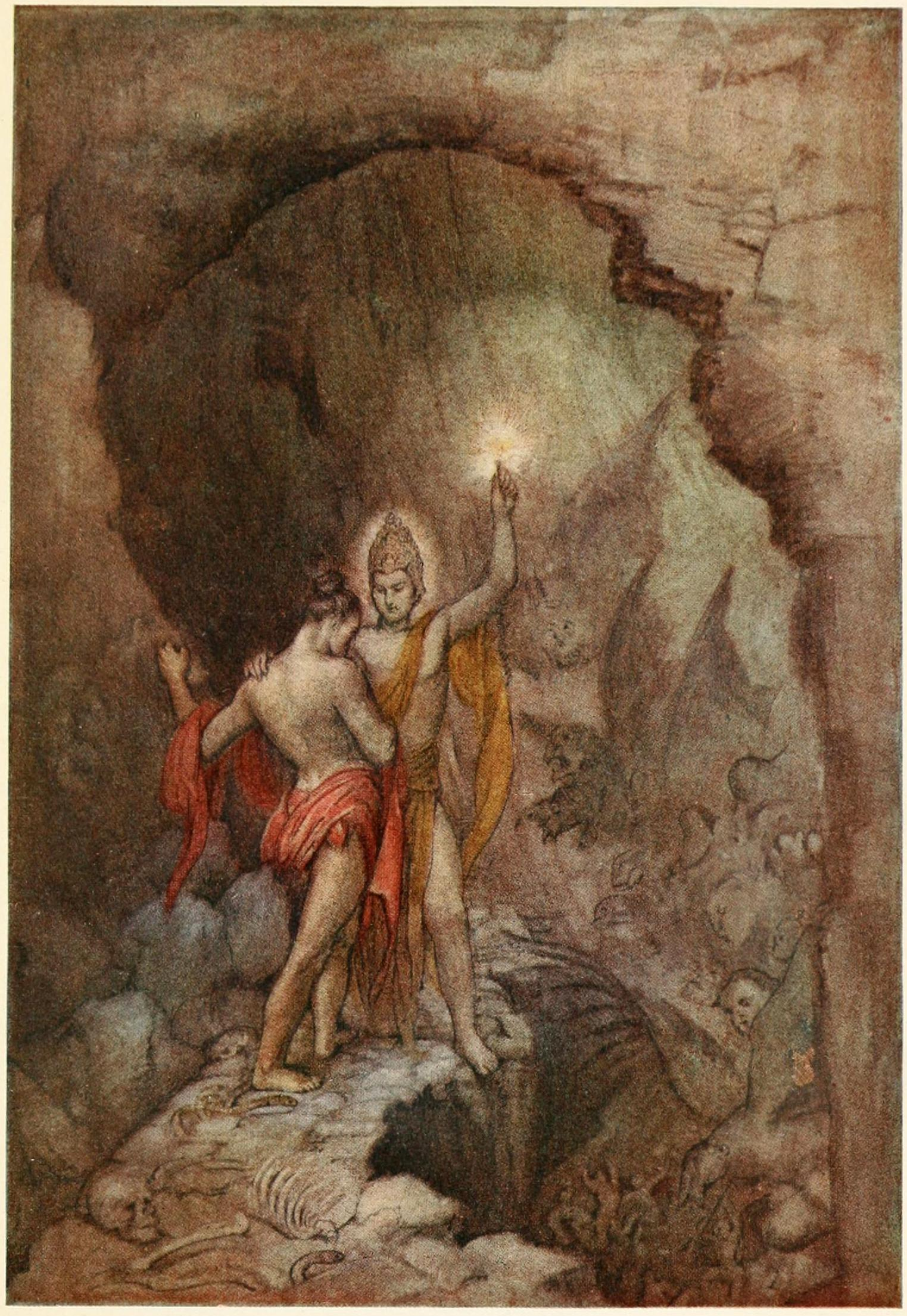
Yudhishthira is believed to enter heaven alive in Mahabharata.

In various religions, certain individuals are believed to have entered heaven without dying first—through "ascension", "assumption", or "translation". Since death is the normal end to an individual's life on Earth and in religion the beginning of the afterlife, entering heaven without dying first is considered exceptional, and usually a sign of a deity's special recognition of the individual's piety.

== Judaism ==
In the Hebrew Bible, there are two figures – Enoch and Elijah – who are said to have entered heaven alive, but both wordings are subject to debate. Genesis 5:24 says "Enoch walked with God; then he was no more, for God took him," but it does not state whether he was alive or dead nor where God took him. The Books of Kings describes the prophet Elijah being taken towards the heavens (Hebrew: שָׁמַיִם, romanized: šāmayim) in a whirlwind, but the word can mean either heaven as the abode of God or the sky (as the word "heavens" does in modern English).

According to the post-biblical Midrash, eight people went to (or will go to) heaven (also referred to as the Garden of Eden and paradise) alive:

- Enoch, Noah's great-grandfather (Genesis 5:22–24)
- Elijah (2 Kings 2:11)
- Serah, daughter of Asher, son of Jacob (midrash Yalkut Shimoni, Yechezkel 367)
- Eliezer, the servant of Abraham who chose Rebecca to be Isaac's wife
- Hiram I, king of Tyre, who helped Solomon build the first temple
- Ebed-Melech, the Ethiopian
- Jaabez, the son of Judah ha-Nasi, who was editor of the Mishnah
- Pharaoh's daughter, sometimes called Bithiah

In a similar vein, there is a Talmudic tale about four rabbis: "Four entered the orchard: Ben Azzai, Ben Zoma, Acher (i.e., Elisha ben Avuya), and Rabbi Akiva. One looked and died. One looked and was harmed. One looked and cut down the trees. And one went up in peace and went down in peace."

== Christianity ==
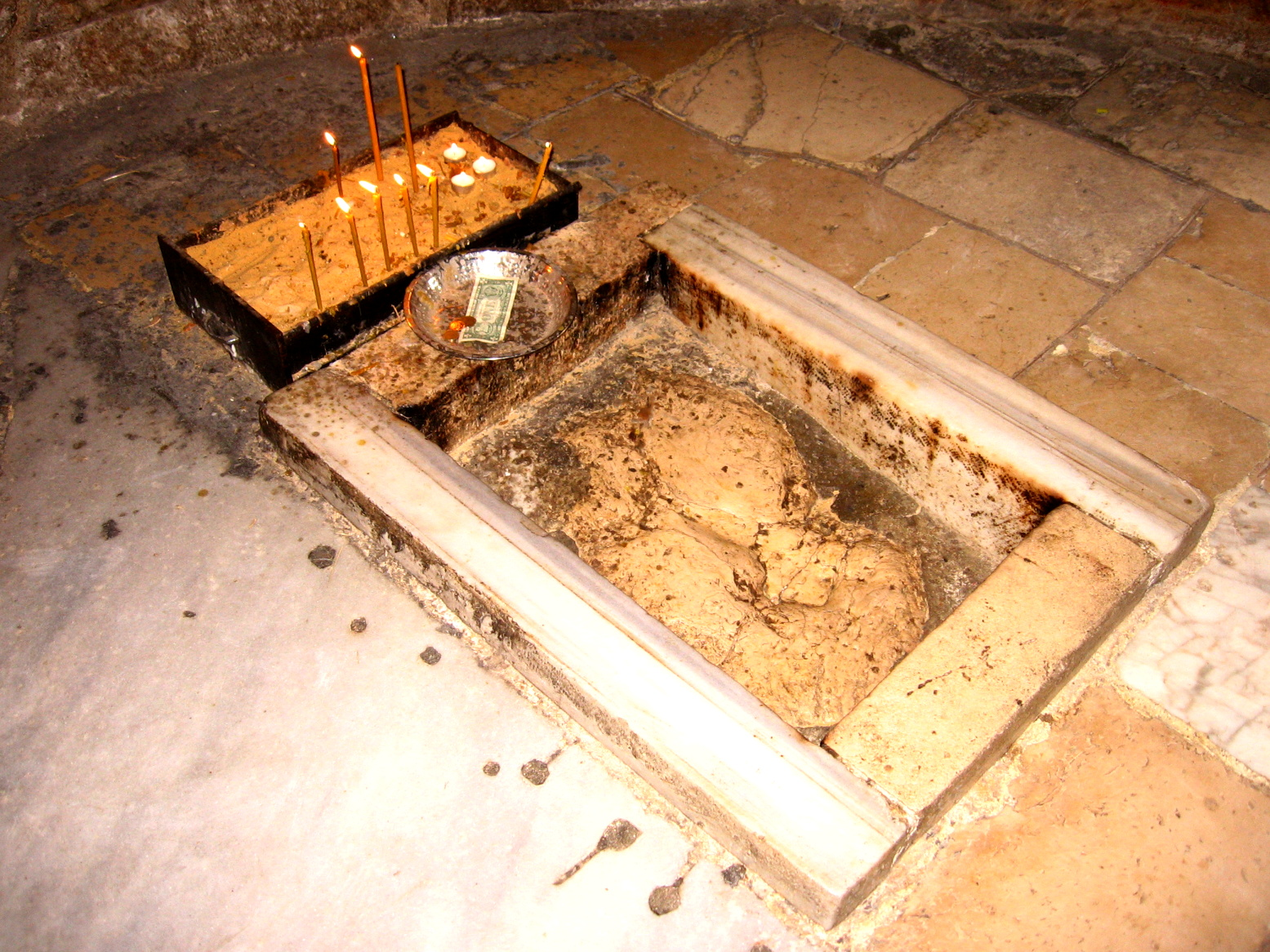
Ascension Rock, inside the Chapel of the Ascension (Jerusalem), is said to bear the imprint of Jesus' right foot as he left Earth and ascended into heaven.

The Christian Old Testament, which is based primarily upon the Hebrew Bible, follows the Jewish narrative and mentions that Enoch was "taken" by God, and that Elijah was bodily assumed into Heaven on a chariot of fire.

Jesus is considered by the vast majority of Christians to have died before being resurrected and ascending to heaven. Most Christians believe Jesus did initially die, but was then resurrected from the dead by God, before being raised bodily to heaven to sit at the Right Hand of God with a promise to someday return to Earth. The fringe views that Jesus did not die are known as the swoon hypothesis and Docetism. Mary, the mother of Jesus, is considered in Eastern Orthodoxy to have died prior to being assumed (translated) into heaven. In like manner, Roman Catholicism affirms that Mary had suffered death prior to her assumption, which has been "expressly affirmed in the Liturgy of the Church" and is expressly seen in paragraph 20 of the proclamation of this teaching. Protestants generally believe that Mary died a natural death like any other human being and subsequently entered heaven in the usual manner, though certain adherents belonging to the Evangelical Catholic tradition of Lutheranism and the Anglo-Catholic tradition of Anglicanism affirm the Assumption of Mary, while others in these traditions reject the Assumption of Mary.

Since the adoption of the Nicene Creed in 325, the ascension of Jesus into heaven, as related in the New Testament, has been officially taught by all orthodox Christian churches and is celebrated on Ascension Thursday. In the Roman Catholic Church, the ascension of the Lord is a Holy Day of Obligation. In the Eastern Orthodox Church, the ascension is one of twelve Great Feasts.

In the Reformed Churches, which teach Calvinist theology, belief in the ascension of Christ is included in the Westminster Confession of Faith, the Heidelberg Catechism and the Second Helvetic Confession.

The dispensationalist belief in a "rapture"—a belief rejected by Catholics, Eastern Orthodox and most Protestants—is drawn from a reference to "being caught up" as found in 1 Thessalonians 4:17, when the "dead in Christ" and "we who are alive and remain" will be caught up in the clouds to meet the Lord, though Christians differ on interpretation.

=== Catholicism ===
The Old Testament indicates that Enoch and Elijah were assumed into heaven while still alive and not experiencing physical death. Pope John Paul II declared: "The depiction of heaven as the transcendent dwelling-place of the living God is joined with that of the place to which believers, through grace, can also ascend, as we see in the Old Testament accounts of Enoch (cf. Gn 5:24) and Elijah (cf. 2 Kgs 2:11) [General Audience, July 21, 1999]."

The Catholic Church distinguishes between the ascension of Jesus, in which he rose to heaven by his own power, and the assumption of Mary, the mother of Jesus, who was raised to heaven by God's power, or the assumption of other saints.

On November 1, 1950, Pope Pius XII, acting ex cathedra, issued Munificentissimus Deus, an authoritative statement of the official dogma of Roman Catholicism. In Section 44 the pope stated:

By the authority of our Lord Jesus Christ, of the Blessed Apostles Peter and Paul, and by our own authority, we pronounce, declare, and define it to be a divinely revealed dogma: that the Immaculate Mother of God, the ever Virgin Mary, having completed the course of her earthly life, was assumed body and soul into heavenly glory.

The doctrine is based on the sacred tradition that Mary was bodily assumed into heaven. For centuries before that, the assumption was celebrated in art and in the Church's liturgy. The proclamation's wording does not state if Mary suffered bodily death before being assumed into heaven; this is left open to individual belief. Some theologians have argued that Mary did not die, while others maintain that she experienced death not due to original sin, but to share in her son's own death and resurrection.

When the tomb of John the Evangelist (who is John the Apostle, according to Christian tradition), located in the Basilica of St. John in Ephesus, during Constantine the Great's reign supposedly yielded no bones, this gave rise to the belief that his body was assumed into heaven (other accounts say that only manna or the saint's sandals was found in the tomb). Augustine of Hippo spoke against the tradition in his Treatises on the Gospel of John (AD 406–420), and Dante attempted to refute the belief in his Paradiso.

Altogether, the Catholic Church has taught by the universal and ordinary magisterium that Saints Enoch and Elijah were assumed into Heaven, and it teaches dogmatically and therefore infallibly that Virgin Mary was assumed into Heaven; that it is acceptable as a pious belief that Saint Joseph was assumed into Heaven; and that it is a pious belief that Moses (after his death) and Saint John the Apostle were assumed into Heaven (though the assumption of Saint John the Apostle has generally been considered much weaker and less probable).

=== Evangelical-Lutheranism ===
James Buckman, an Evangelical-Lutheran priest, wrote on the topic of entering heaven alive:

Transfiguration Sunday (March 2nd ) reminds us that we will bodily be in Heaven because there are already people who are bodily in Heaven – Jesus, Moses, and Elijah. We know from Scripture that Enoch also is already in Heaven, bodily (Genesis 5:24). Elijah’s departure from Earth, up to Heaven, is given a more full accounting and you can read it in 2 Kings 2:1-11. Moses’ route to Heaven is recorded for us in the New Testament and it is very interesting (Jude 1:9). The Archangel Michael was sent by God to get Moses’ body, but Satan argues with Michael, something Satan does against Michael (Daniel chapter 10 and Revelation chapter 12). It is interesting to remember that when Jesus returns, and all of the dead are raised in bodily form, “For the Lord himself will descend from heaven with a cry of command, with the voice of an archangel, and with the sound of the trumpet of God. And the dead in Christ will rise first.” (1 Thessalonians 4:16).

=== Eastern Christianity ===
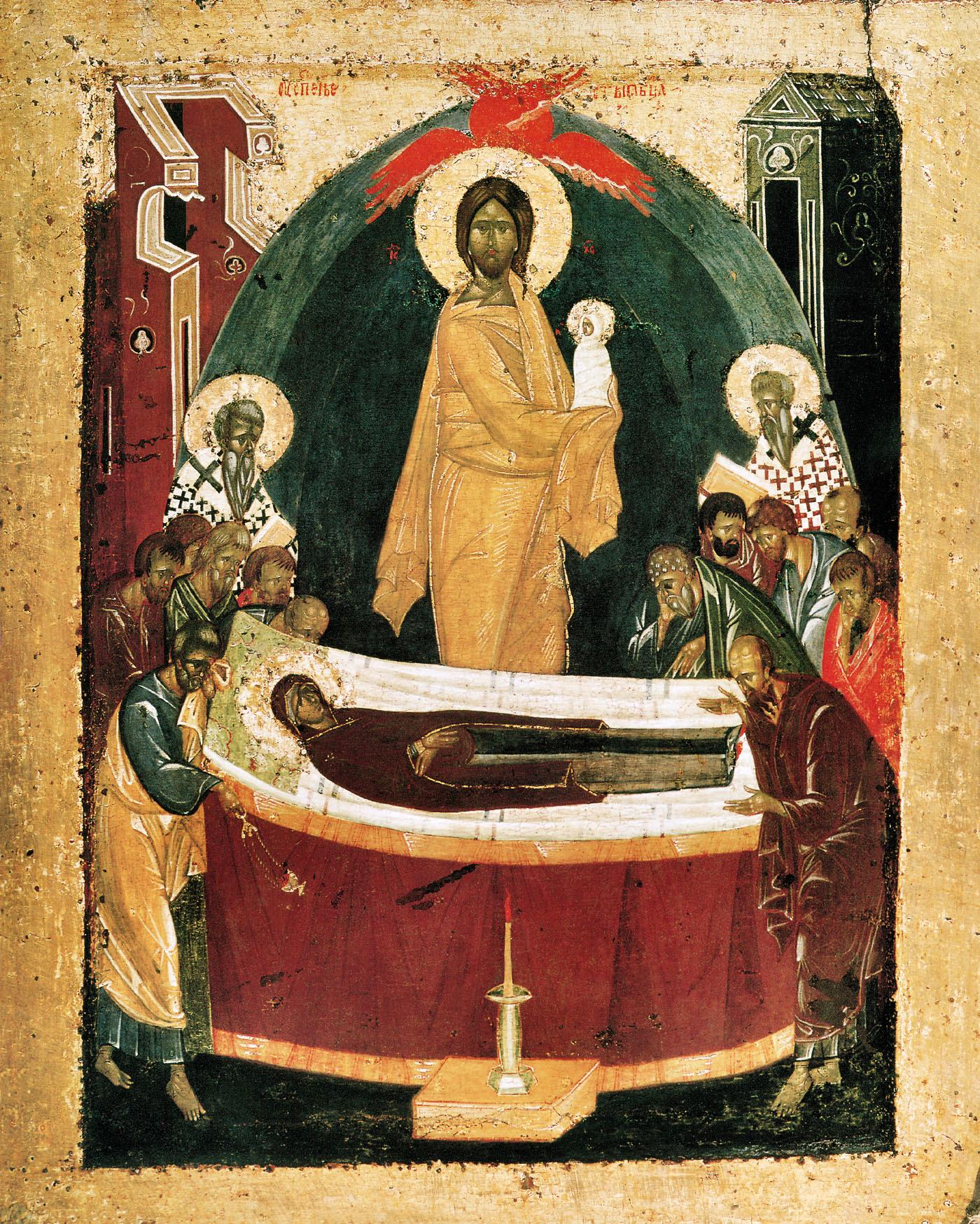
Orthodox icon of the Dormition of the Theotokos (1392, Theophan the Greek)

The Eastern Orthodox Church teaches that three other persons were taken bodily into heaven: Enoch and Elijah (Elias) entered without dying. However, the Theotokos (Virgin Mary) died, was resurrected, and taken to heaven, unlike the Western Assumption of Mary. However, the Orthodox also celebrate the Dormition of the Mother of God on August 15. The Orthodox teach that Mary died a natural death like any other human being, that she was buried by the Apostles (except for Thomas, who was late), and three days later (after Thomas had arrived) was found to be missing from her tomb. The church teaches that the Apostles received a revelation during which the Theotokos appeared to them and told them she had been resurrected by Jesus and taken body and soul into heaven. The Orthodox teach that Mary already enjoys the fullness of heavenly bliss that the other saints will experience only after the Last Judgment.

== Mandaeism ==
In Mandaeism, the Left Ginza mentions that Shitil (Seth), the son of Adam, was taken alive to the World of Light without a masiqta (death mass).

== Hellenistic religion ==
Apollonius of Tyana was said to have been assumed into Elysium by Philostratus.

== Hinduism ==
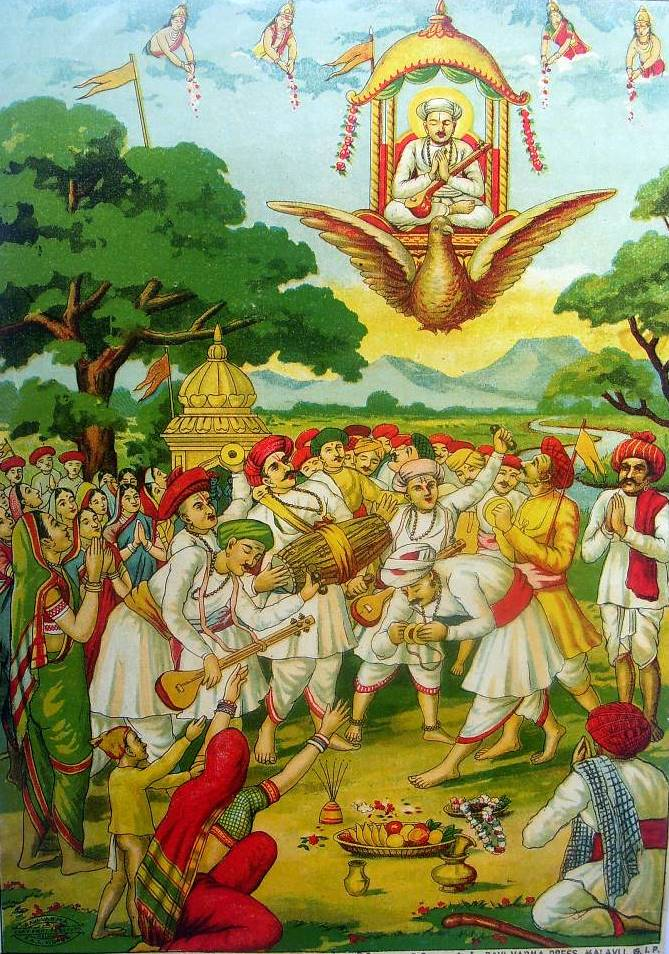
Tukaram is said to have left for Vaikuntha, the heavenly abode of the god Vishnu at the end of his earthly life.

Yudhishthira of the Mahabharata and Lakshmana of the Ramayana are believed to have been the only humans able to cross the plane between mortals and heaven (Svarga) while still in their mortal bodies.

Nahusha was admitted to heaven in his human body, as were several other kings.

Tukaram is believed to have been taken to Vaikuntha on Garuda, an event that is reported to have been witnessed by villagers.

== Islam ==
=== Muhammad ===
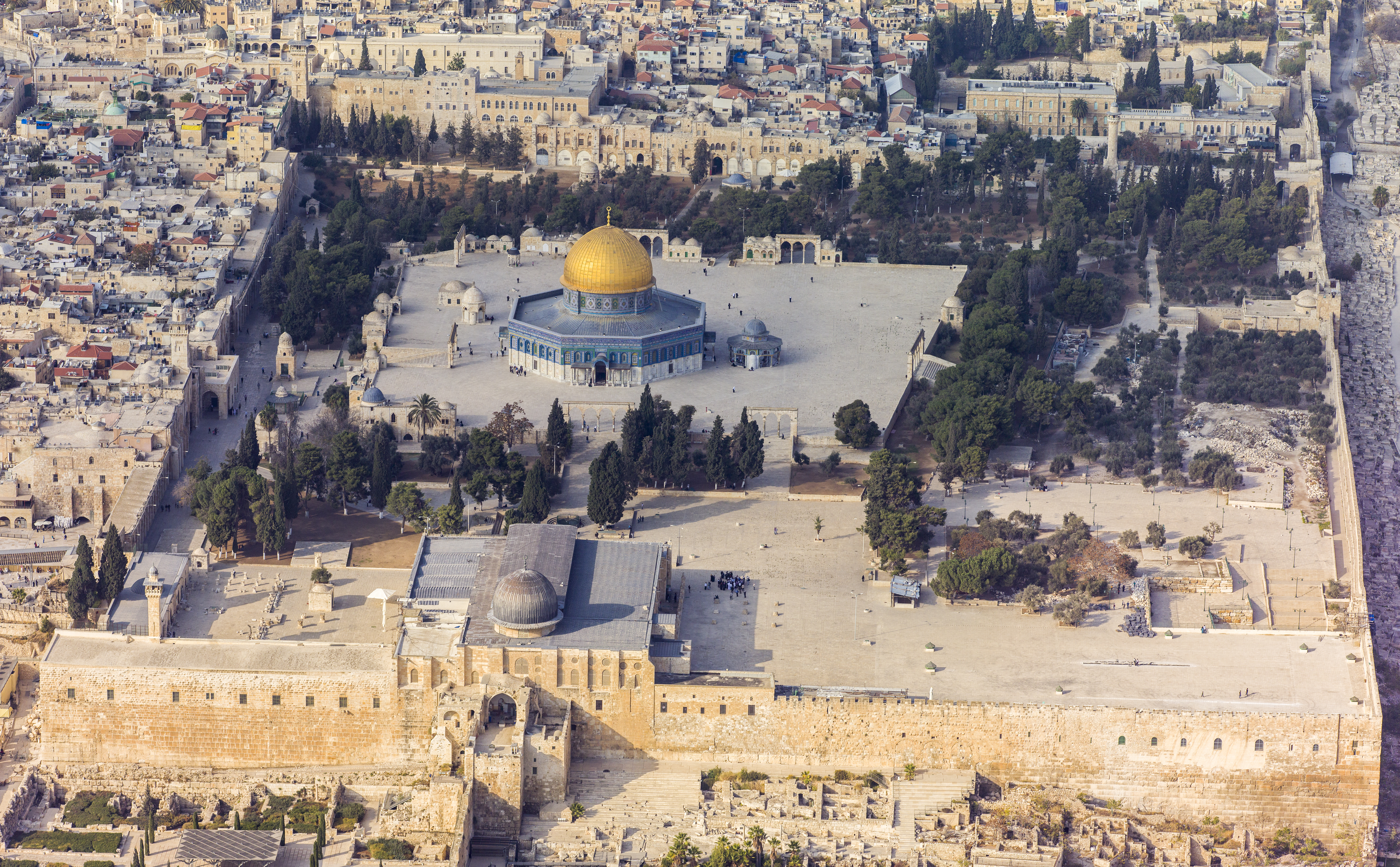
The Al-Aqsa in Jerusalem is believed to be the location of Muhammad's ascension to heaven.

The Qur'an, central religious text of Islam, teaches that Muhammad was transported from the Great Mosque of Mecca to Al-Aqsa during the Night Journey. After leading prayers at the mosque, Muhammad ascended into heaven alive. In heaven, he individually greets previous prophets and later, speaks to Allah, who gives him instructions regarding the details of prayer. Muhammad's ascent into heaven was temporary, and he later came back to Earth. In the hadith, later collections of the reports, teachings, deeds and sayings of Muhammad, the Al-Aqsa Mosque was understood as relating to Temple Mount in Jerusalem. The Al-Aqsa Mosque, derived from the name mentioned in the Qur'an, was built on the Temple Mount under the Umayyads several decades after Muhammad's death to commemorate the place from which Muslims believe he had ascended to heaven.

=== Jesus ===
Islamic texts deny the idea of crucifixion or death attributed to Jesus by the New Testament. The Quran states that people (i.e., the Jews and Romans) sought to kill Jesus, but they could not crucify or kill him, although "this was made to appear to them". Muslims believe that Jesus was not crucified but instead he was raised by God unto the heavens. This "raising" is often understood to mean through bodily ascension.

=== Idris as Enoch ===
Some Islamic scholars have identified the Prophet Idris to be the same person as Enoch from the Bible. This is because the Quran states that God "raised him to a lofty station", and that has been taken to be a term for ascending, upon which it is concluded that "Idris" was "Enoch".

== Ascended Master Teachings ==
Members of various Ascended Master Teachings, a group of New Age religions based on Theosophy, believe that Francis Bacon underwent a physical Ascension without experiencing death (he then became the deity St. Germain). They also believe numerous others have undergone Ascension; they are called the Ascended Masters and act as spirit guides to human souls on their spiritual path. The leaders of these religions claim to be able to receive channeled messages from the Ascended Masters, which they then relay to their followers.

== See also ==
- Apotheosis
- Spirit away
- Rapture
