= Hermes Trismegistus =

Legendary author of the Hermetica

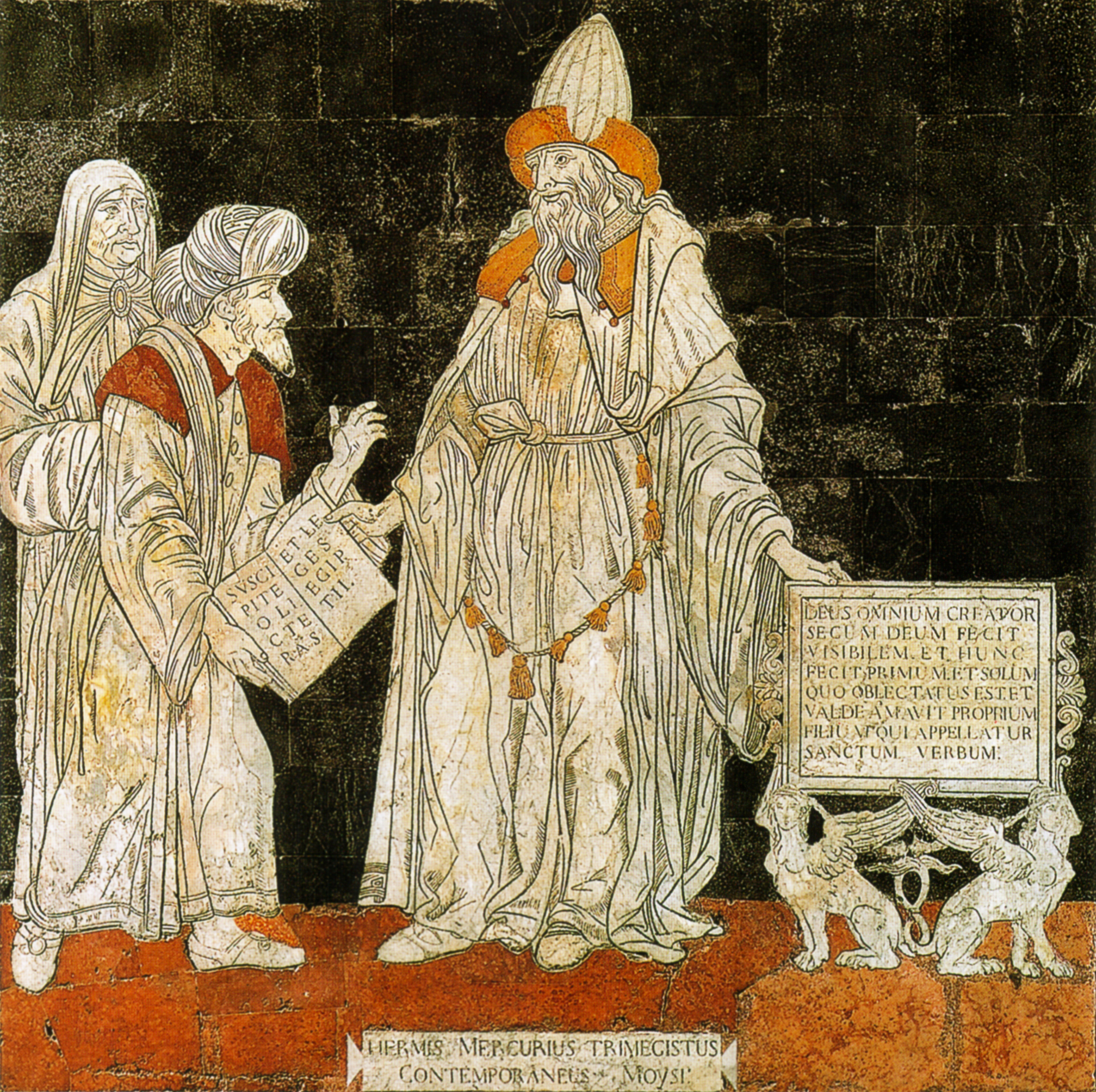
16th century European depiction of Hermes Trismegistus as an old sage and teacher

Hermes Trismegistus (from Ancient Greek: Ἑρμῆς ὁ Τρισμέγιστος, lit. 'Hermes the Thrice-Greatest') is a legendary Hellenistic period figure that originated as a syncretic combination of the Greek god Hermes and the Egyptian god Thoth. (Note: A survey of the literary and archaeological evidence for the background of Hermes Trismegistus as the Greek god Hermes and the Egyptian god Thoth may be found in Bull (2018).) He is the purported author of the Hermetica, a widely diverse series of ancient and medieval pseudepigraphica that laid the basis of various philosophical systems known as Hermeticism.

The wisdom attributed to this figure in antiquity combined a knowledge of both the material and the spiritual world, which rendered the writings attributed to him of great relevance to those who were interested in the interrelationship between the material and the divine.

The figure of Hermes Trismegistus can also be found in both Muslim and Baháʼí writings. In those traditions, Hermes Trismegistus has been associated with the prophet Idris (i.e., the biblical Enoch).

== Origin and identity ==
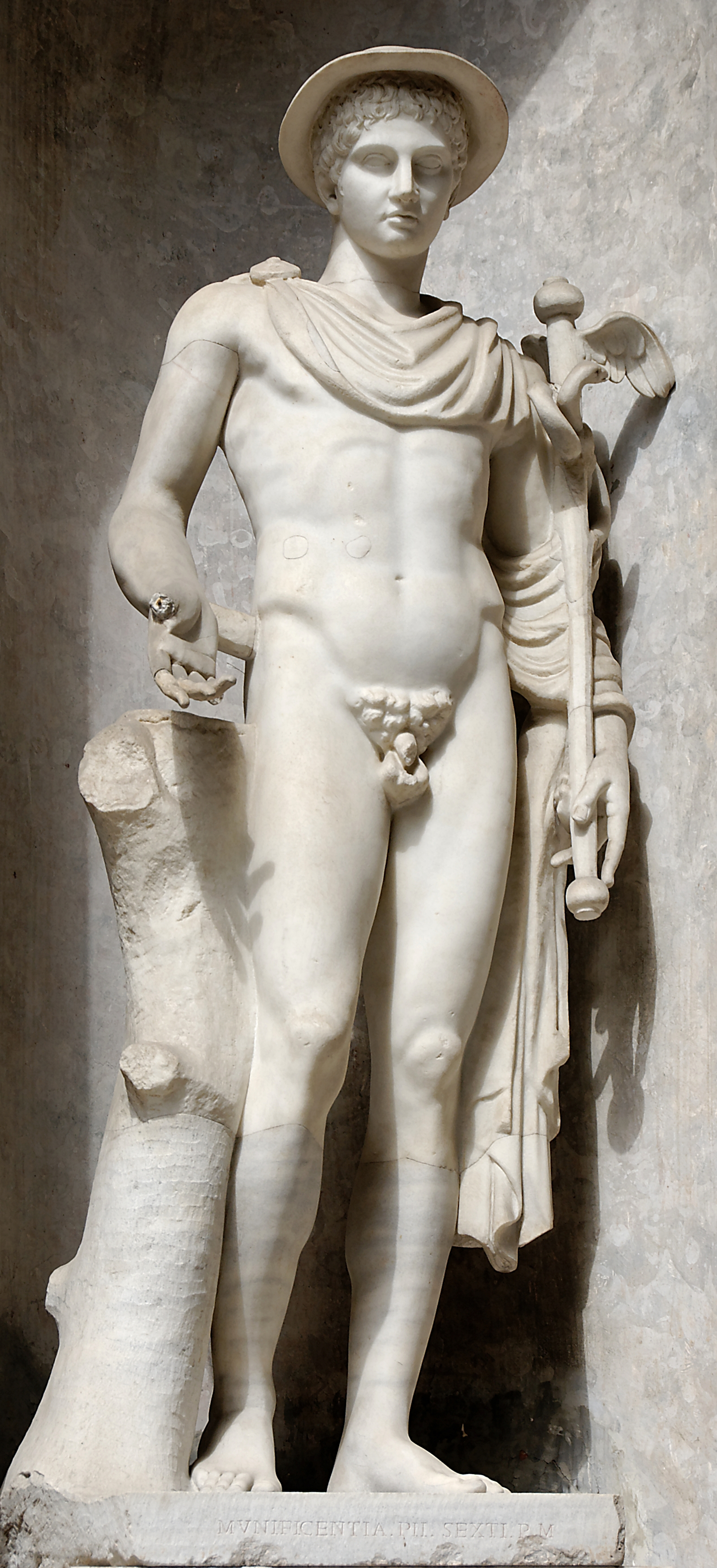
Hermes depicted with a winged kerykeion, a kithara, a petasos and chlamys.

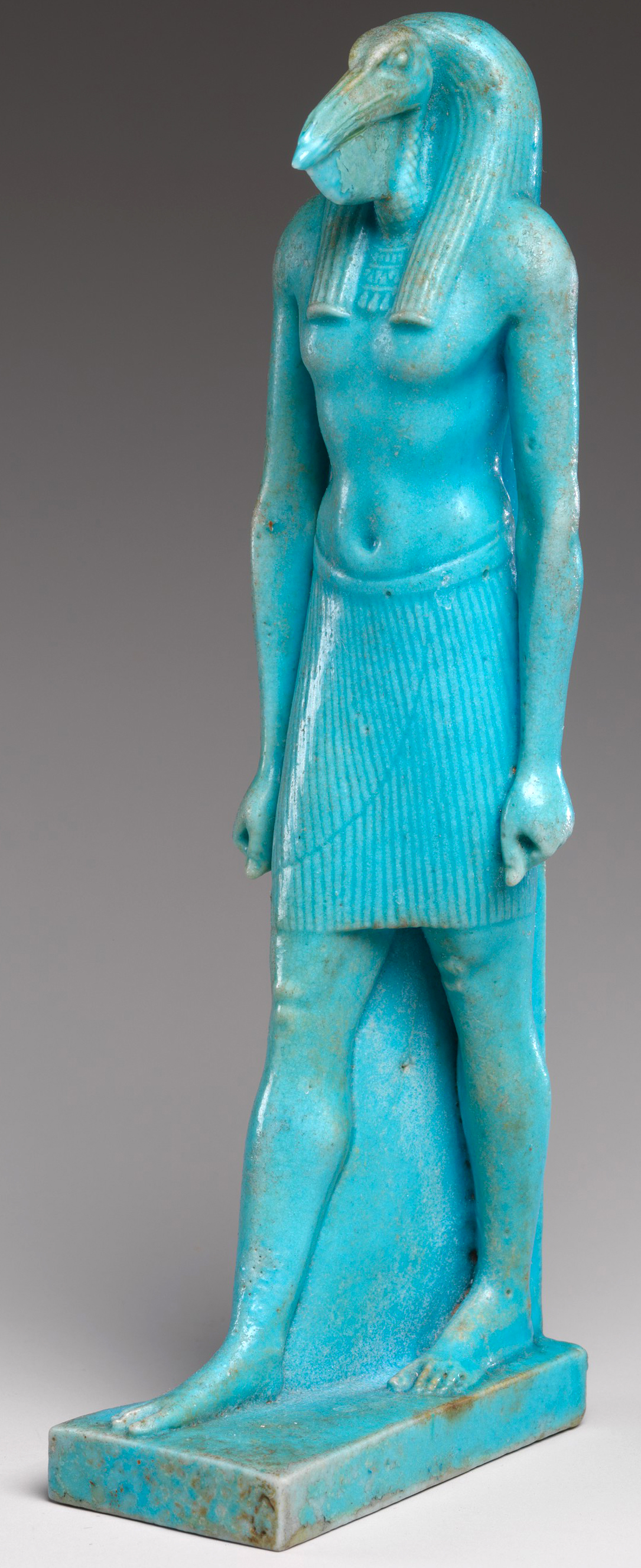
Ancient Egyptian statue of the ibis-headed Thoth.

Hermes Trismegistus may be associated with the Greek god Hermes and the Egyptian god Thoth. Greeks in the Ptolemaic Kingdom of Egypt identified Thoth with Hermes through the interpretatio graeca. Consequently, the two gods were worshiped as one, in what had been the Temple of Thoth in Khemenu, which was known in the Hellenistic period as Hermopolis.

Hermes, the Greek god of interpretive communication, was combined with Thoth, the Egyptian god of wisdom. The Egyptian priest and polymath Imhotep had been deified long after his death, and therefore assimilated to Thoth in the classical and Hellenistic periods. The renowned scribe Amenhotep, son of Hapu, and a wise man named Teôs were coequal deities of wisdom, science, and medicine; and, thus, they were placed alongside Imhotep in shrines dedicated to Thoth–Hermes during the Ptolemaic Kingdom.

Cicero enumerates several deities referred to as "Hermes":

- "fourth Mercury (Hermes) was the son of the Nile, whose name may not be spoken by the Egyptians".
- "the fifth, who is worshiped by the people of Pheneus [in Arcadia], is said to have killed Argus Panoptes, and for this reason to have fled to Egypt, and to have given the Egyptians their laws and alphabet: It is him whom the Egyptians call Theyt".

The most likely interpretation of this passage is as two variants on the same religious syncretism of Greek Hermes and Egyptian Thoth (or sometimes other gods): The fourth, wherein Hermes turns out "actually" to have been a "son of the Nile" (i.e. a, native Egyptian god), is the Egyptian perspective. The fifth, who went from Greece to Egypt, is the Arcadian Greek perspective. Both of these early references in Cicero (the oldest Trismegistus material is from the early centuries CE) corroborate the view that Thrice-Great Hermes originated in Hellenistic Egypt through syncretism between Greek and Egyptian gods (the Hermetica refer most often to Thoth and Amun).

The Hermetic literature of the Egyptians was concerned with conjuring spirits and animating statues, the newly developed practice of alchemy, and informs the oldest Hellenistic writings on Greco-Babylonian astrology. In a parallel tradition, Hermetic philosophy rationalized and systematized religious cult practices and offered the adept a means of personal ascension from the constraints of physical being. This latter tradition has led to the conflation of Hermeticism with the contemporaneously developing, but distinct, Gnosticism.

== The epithet "thrice great" ==
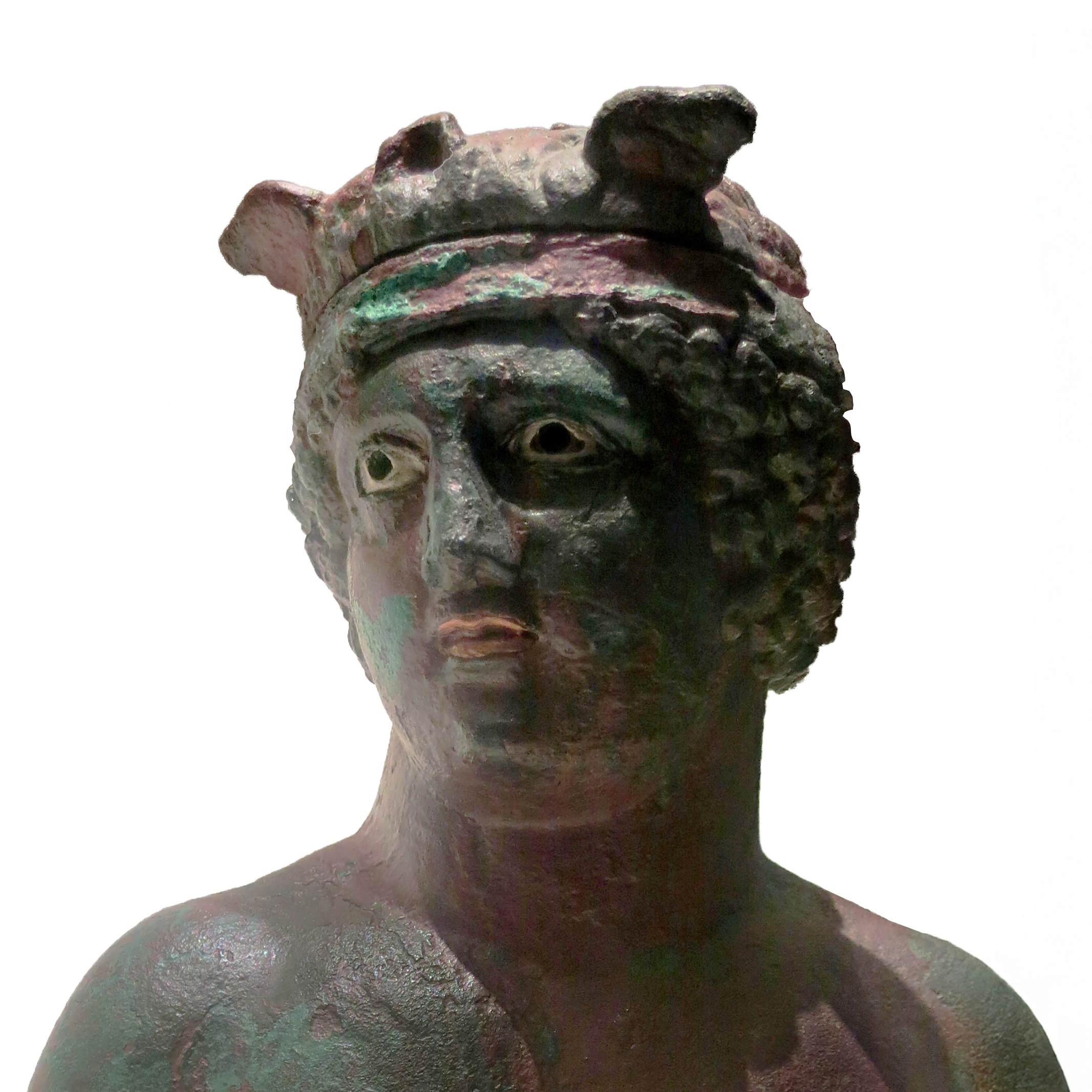
Youthful, athletic Hermes-Thoth, identified by Maat feather between his headdress-wings.

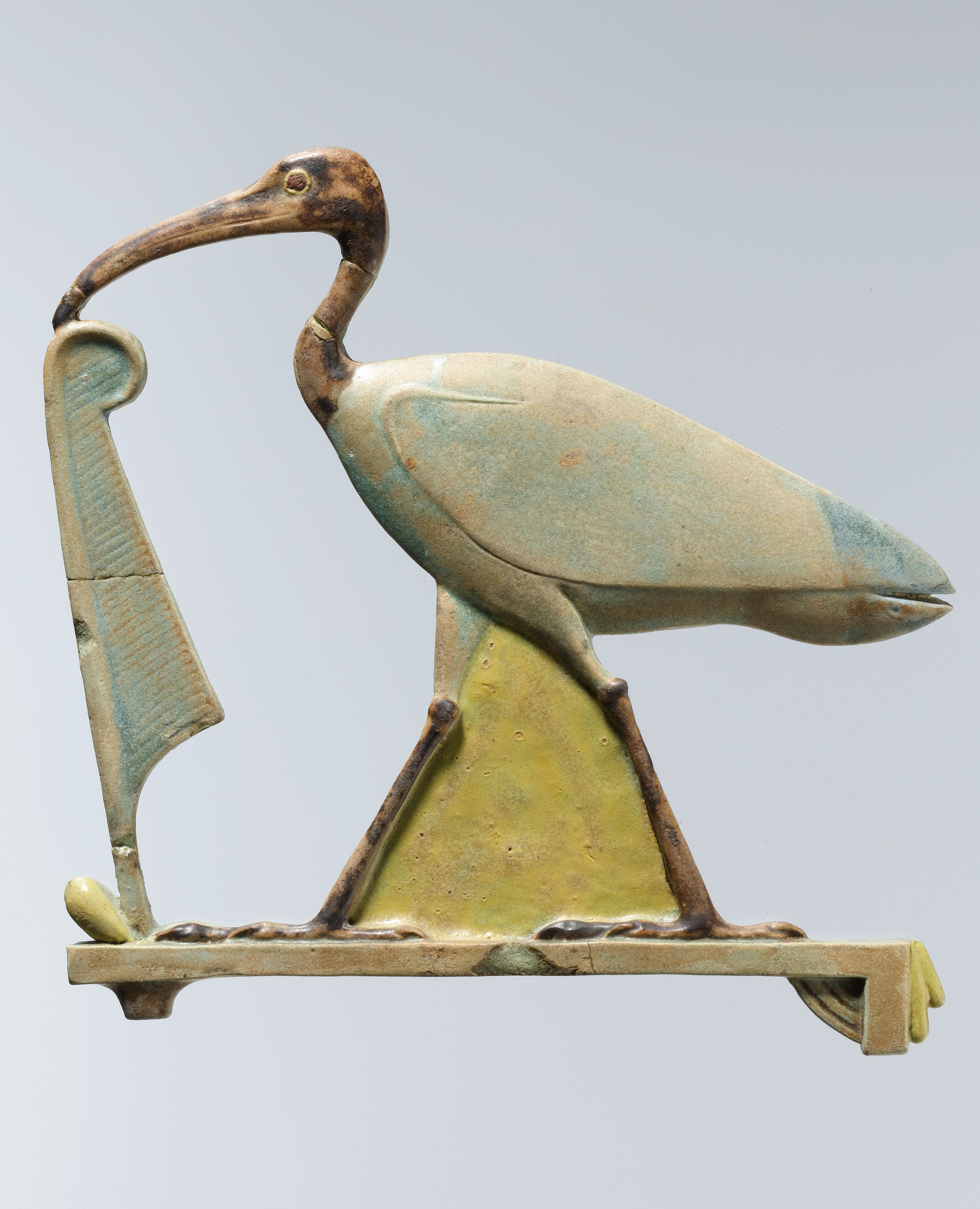
Traditional depiction of Thoth as the ibis with said Feather of Truth.

Fowden asserts that the first datable occurrences of the epithet "thrice great" are in the Legatio of Athenagoras of Athens and in a fragment from Philo of Byblos c. 64–141 CE. However, in a later work, Copenhaver reports that this epithet is first found in the minutes of a meeting of the council of the Ibis cult, held in 172 BCE near Memphis, Egypt. Hart explains that the epithet is derived from an epithet of Thoth found at the Temple of Esna: "Thoth the great, the great, the great."

Many Christian writers, including Lactantius, Augustine, Marsilio Ficino, Tommaso Campanella, and Giovanni Pico della Mirandola, as well as Giordano Bruno, considered Hermes Trismegistus to be a wise pagan prophet who foresaw the coming of Christianity. They believed in the existence of a prisca theologia, a single, true theology that threads through all religions. It was given by God to humankind in antiquity and passed through a series of prophets, which included Zoroaster and Plato. In order to demonstrate the verity of the prisca theologia, Christians appropriated the Hermetic teachings for their own purposes. By this account, Hermes Trismegistus was either a contemporary of Moses, or the third in a line of men named Hermes (i.e., Enoch, Noah, and the Egyptian priest king Hermes Trismegistus, insofar as they are the greatest priest, philosopher, and king, respectively).

Another explanation, in the Suda (10th century), is that "He was called 'Trismegistus' on account of his praise of the Trinity, saying there is one divine nature in the Trinity."

== Hermetic writings ==
During the Middle Ages and the Renaissance, the Hermetica enjoyed great prestige and were popular among alchemists. Hermes was also strongly associated with astrology, for example by the influential Islamic astrologer Abu Ma'shar al-Balkhi (787–886). The "Hermetic tradition" consequently refers to alchemy, magic, astrology, and related subjects. By modern convention the texts are usually subdivided into two categories:

philosophical hermetica	deals mainly with philosophy and cosmology
technical hermetica	concerns practical magic, potions, and alchemy

The expression hermetically sealed comes from the alchemical procedure to make the Philosopher's Stone. This required a mixture of materials to be placed in a glass vessel which was sealed by melting and fusing the neck closed, a procedure known as the "Seal of Hermes". The vessel was then heated for 30–40 days.

During the Renaissance, it was accepted that Hermes Trismegistus was a contemporary of Moses. However, after Isaac Casaubon's demonstration in 1614 that the Hermetic writings must postdate the advent of Christianity, the whole of Renaissance Hermeticism collapsed. As to their actual authorship:

... they were certainly not written in remotest antiquity by an all wise Egyptian priest, as the Renaissance believed, but by various unknown authors, all probably Greeks, and they contain popular Greek philosophy of the period, a mixture of Platonism and Stoicism, combined with some Jewish and probably some Persian influences.

The French figurist Jesuit missionary to China Joachim Bouvet thought that Hermes Trismegistus, Zoroaster and the Chinese cultural hero Fuxi were actually the Biblical patriarch Enoch.

Various critical editions of the Hermetica have been published in modern academia, such as Hermetica by Brian Copenhaver.

== Islamic tradition ==
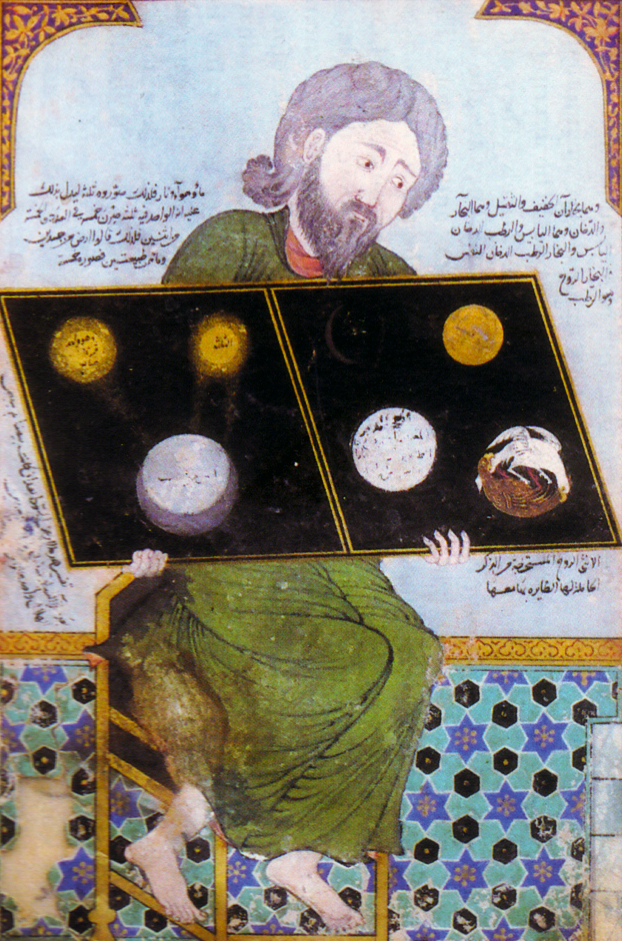
Statue of "the Sage", Hermes Trismegistus, from a 14th century Arabic manuscript.

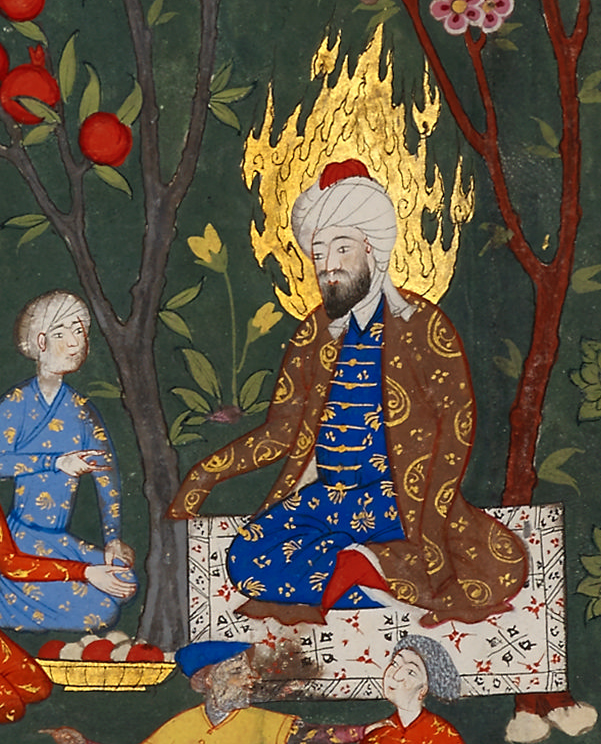
Idris teaching in Paradise from a 1577 Qisas al-Anbiya manuscript.

Faivre (1995) has pointed out that Hermes Trismegistus has a place in the Islamic tradition, although the name Hermes does not appear in the Qur'an. Hagiographers and chroniclers of the first centuries of the Islamic Hijrah quickly identified Hermes Trismegistus with Idris, (Note: "Abu Mas'har's biography of Hermes, written approximately between 840 and 860, would establish it as common knowledge."Van Bladel (2009), p. 168) the Islamic prophet of surahs 19.57 and 21.85, whom Muslims also identified with Enoch (cf. Genesis 5:18–24). According to the account of the Persian astrologer Abu Ma'shar al-Balkhi (787–886), Idris / Hermes was termed "Thrice-Wise" Hermes Trismegistus because he had a threefold origin. The first Hermes, comparable to Thoth, was a "civilizing hero", an initiator into the mysteries of the divine science and wisdom that animate the world; he carved the principles of this sacred science in hieroglyphs. The second Hermes, in Babylon, was the initiator of Pythagoras. The third Hermes was the first teacher of alchemy. Islamicist Pierre Lory writes:

"A faceless prophet, Hermes [Trismegistus] possesses no concrete or salient characteristics, differing in this regard from most of the major figures of the Bible and the Quran."

The star-worshipping sect known as the Sabians of Harran also believed that their doctrine descended from Hermes Trismegistus.

There are least twenty Arabic Hermetica extant. While some of these Arabic Hermetic writings were translated from Greek or Middle-Persian, some were originally written in Arabic. Hermetic fragments are also found in the works of Muslim alchemists such as Jabir ibn Hayyan (died c. 806–816, cited an early version of the Emerald Tablet in his Kitāb Usṭuqus al-uss) (Note: Jabir explicitly notes that the version of the Emerald Tablet quoted by him is taken from "Balīnās the Sage" (i.e., pseudo-Apollonius of Tyana), although it differs slightly from the (probably even earlier) version preserved in pseudo-Apollonius of Tyana's Sirr al-khalīqa (The Secret of Creation). See Weisser (1980), p. 46 Ibn Umayl c. 900 – c. 960, quoted and commented upon Hermetic sayings throughout his work, among them also a commentary on the Emerald Tablet).)

== Baháʼí writings ==
Bahá'u'lláh, founder of the Baháʼí Faith, identifies Idris with Hermes in his Tablet on the Uncompounded Reality.

== Bibliography ==
- Aufrère, Sydney H. (2008, in French) Thot Hermès l'Egyptien: De l'infiniment grand à l'infiniment petit. Paris: L'Harmattan. ISBN 978-2-296-04639-9.
- Bull, Christian H. (2018) The Tradition of Hermes Trismegistus: The Egyptian priestly figure as a teacher of hellenized wisdom. Leiden: Brill. — the standard reference work on the subject.
- Caciorgna, Marilena & Guerrini, Roberto (2004, in Italian) "Il pavimento del duomo di Siena" in L'arte della tarsia marmorea dal XIV al XIX secolo fonti e simologia. Siena.
- Caciorgna, Marilena (27–28 September 2002). Studi interdisciplinari sul pavimento del duomo di Siena [Interdisciplinary studies on the floor of the Siena Cathedral]. Convegno internazionale di studi chiesa della SS. Annunziata 27 e 28 settembre 2002 [The International Conference on Studies of the Church of the Holy Annunciation, 27–28 September 2002, Siena]. Collana di studi e ricerche (Opera della Metropolitana di Siena) (in Italian). Vol. 2. Siena: Cantagalli. ISBN 978-8-8827-2214-2. OCLC 60390508.;
- Copenhaver, Brian P. (1995) Hermetica: The Greek Corpus Hermeticum and the Latin Asclepius in a new English translation, with notes and introduction. Cambridge, England / New York: Cambridge University Press, ISBN 0-521-42543-3.
- Ebeling, Florian (2007) The secret history of Hermes Trismegistus: Hermeticism from ancient to modern times [translated from the German by David Lorton]. Ithaca, New York: Cornell University Press, ISBN 978-0-8014-4546-0.
- Festugière, A.-J. (1981, in French) La révélation d'Hermès Trismégiste. 2e éd. Paris.
- Fowden, Garth (1993) [1986]. The Egyptian Hermes: A historical approach to the late pagan mind. Princeton University Press.— deals with Thoth (Hermes) from his most primitive known conception to his later evolution into Hermes Trismegistus, as well as the many books and scripts attributed to him.
- Furtwangler, Adolf (1906). "Noch einmal zu Hermes-Thot und Apis". Bonner Jahrbücher (in German). pp. 114–115, 198 ff.
- Furtwangler, Adolf (1898). "Römische Bronzen aus Deutschland". Bonner Jahrbücher (in German). p. 103.
- Hornung, Erik (2001) The Secret Lore of Egypt: Its impact on the west. Translated by David Lorton. Ithaca, New York: Cornell University Press. ISBN 0801438470.
- Lupini, Carmelo (2010, in Italian) see "Ermete Trismegisto" in Dizionario delle Scienze e delle Tecniche di Grecia e Roma, vol. 1. Rome.
- Merkel, Ingrid & Debus, A.G. (1988) Hermeticism and the Renaissance: Intellectual history and the occult in early modern Europe. Washington, D.C.: Folger Shakespeare Library, ISBN 0-918016-85-1.
- Mungello, D.E. (1989). Curious Land: Jesuit accommodation and the origins of sinology. Honolulu, Hawaii: University of Hawaii Press. ISBN 0-8248-1219-0 – via Google Books.
- Van Bladel, Kevin (2009). The Arabic Hermes: From pagan sage to prophet of science. Oxford University Press. doi:10.1093/acprof:oso/9780195376135.001.0001. ISBN 978-0-19-537613-5. (the standard reference for Hermes in the Arabic-Islamic world)
- van den Kerchove, Anna (2012, in French) La voie d'Hermès: Pratiques rituelles et traités hermétiques. Leiden: Brill.
- Yates, F.A. (1964) Giordano Bruno and the Hermetic Tradition. University of Chicago Press.
