= Hikmet =

Hikmet is a given name. Notable people with the name include:

== Given name ==
- Hikmet Avedis aka Howard Avedis, (1927–2017), film producer and director
- Hikmet Çetin (born 1937), Turkish politician
- Hikmet Fidan (1955–2005), Kurdish-born Turkish politician
- Hikmet Karaman (born 1960), Turkish football coach
- Hikmet Tanyu (1918–1992), Turkish scientist and academic
- Hikmet Temel Akarsu (born 1960), Turkish novelist
- Hikmet Topuzer (1893-1958), Turkish football player
- Hikmet Vurgun, Turkish handball coach and academic
- Hikmet Uluğbay (born 1939), Turkish politician

=== Middle name ===
- Arif Hikmet Koyunoğlu (1888–1982), Turkish architect
- Fatma Hikmet İşmen (1918–2006), Turkish engineer and politician

== Surname ==
- Ahmed Hikmet (born 1984), Bulgarian footballer of Turkish descent
- Ayhan Hikmet (1929–1962), Turkish Cypriot barrister assassinated by the TMT paramilitary group
- Birol Hikmet (born 1982), Turkish football player
- Nâzım Hikmet (1902–1963), Turkish poet, playwright, novelist and memoirist

== See also ==
- Hikmat (disambiguation)
- Hikmet, Ottoman-Turkish magazine
