= Idris (prophet) =

Islamic prophet

Prophet ʾIdrīs Alayhi as-Salam
- إدريس; Enoch
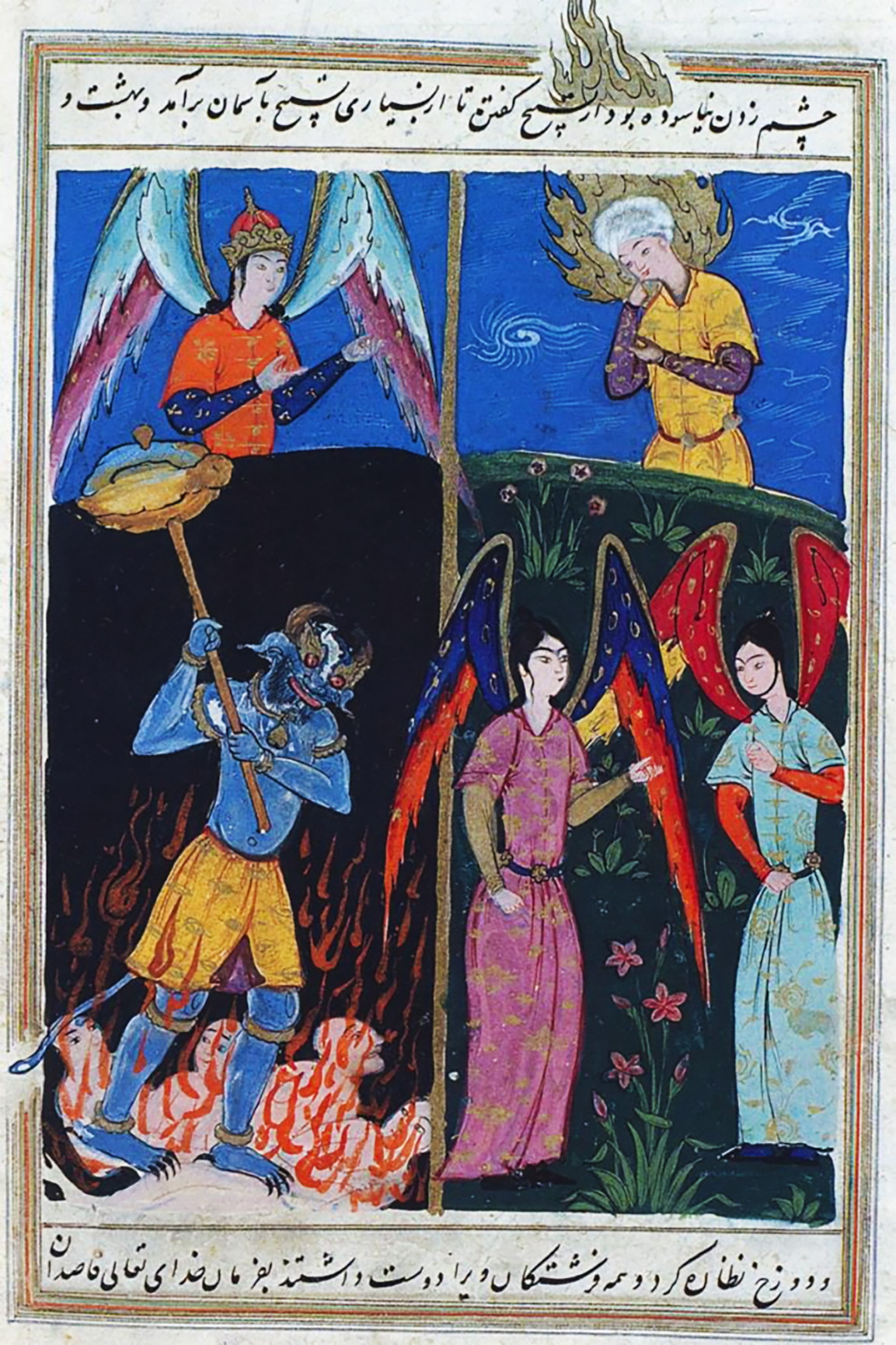
- Idris (top right) is taken to the heavens and sees Paradise and Hell.

Prophet of Islam
- Preceded by: Sheth
- Succeeded by: Nuh (Note: Assuming Idris is identical with Enoch.)

Personal life
- Born: Babylon

Religious life
- Religion: Islam

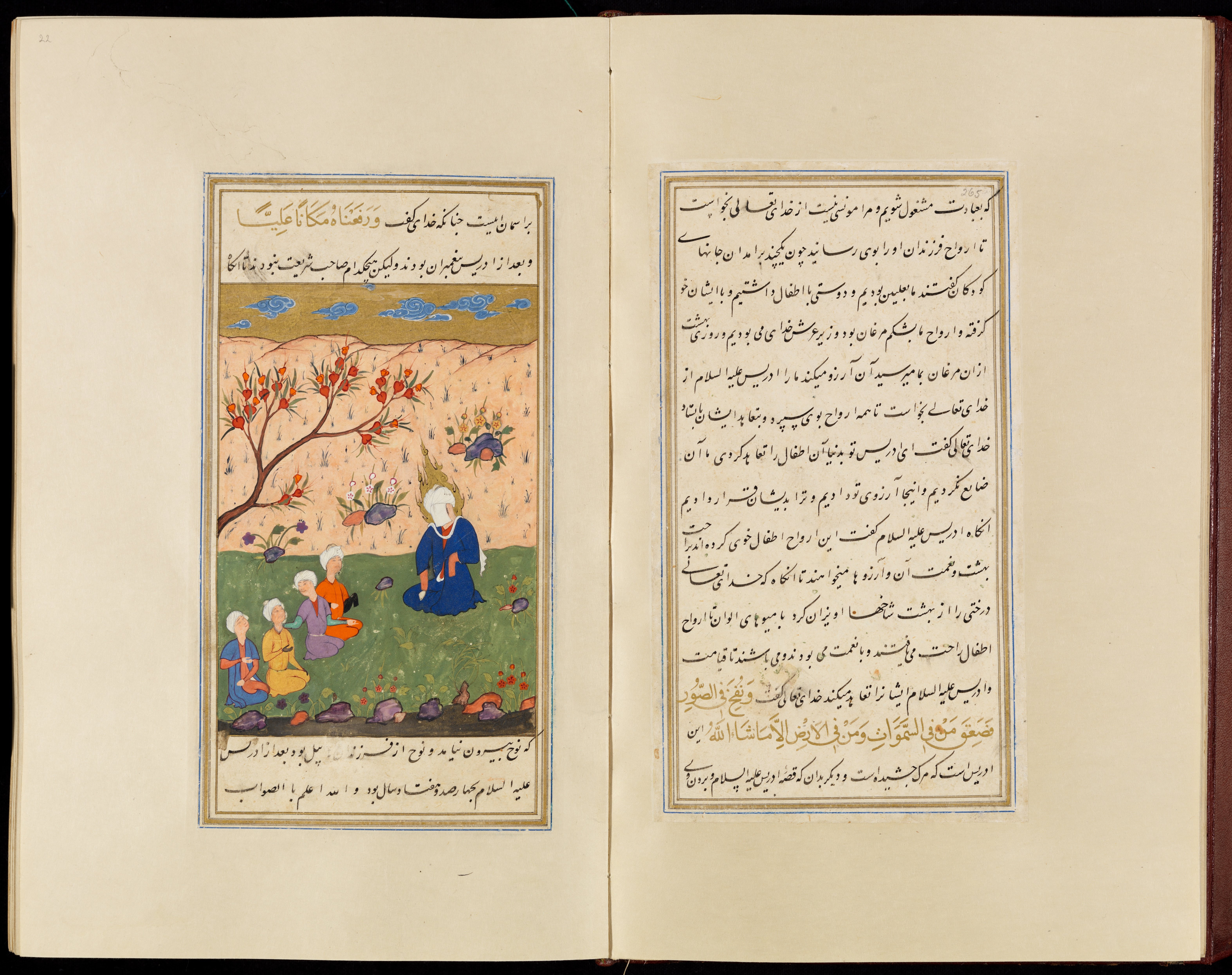
Idris Instructing his Children, Double page from the manuscript of Qisas al-Anbiya by Ishaq ibn Ibrahim al-Nishapuri. Iran (probably Qazvin), 1570–80. Chester Beatty Library.

Idris (Arabic: إدريس, romanized: ʾIdrīs) is an ancient prophet mentioned in the Quran, who Muslims believe was the second prophet after Adam. He is the third prophet mentioned in the Quran. Islamic tradition has unanimously identified Idris with the biblical Enoch. Many Muslim scholars of the classical and medieval periods held that Idris and Hermes Trismegistus were the same person.

He is described in the Quran as "trustworthy" and "patient" and the Quran also says that he was "exalted to a high station". Because of this and other parallels, traditionally Idris has been identified with the biblical Enoch, and Islamic tradition usually places Idris in the early Generations of Adam, and considers him one of the oldest prophets mentioned in the Quran, placing him between Adam and Noah. Idris' unique status inspired many future traditions and stories surrounding him in Islamic folklore.

According to a hadith narrated by Malik ibn Anas and found in Sahih Muslim, it is said that on Muhammad's Night Journey, he encountered Idris in the fourth of the seven heavens. The traditions that have developed around the figure of Idris have given him the scope of a prophet as well as a philosopher and mystic, and many later Muslim mystics, or Sufis, including Ruzbihan Baqli and Ibn 'Arabi, also mentioned having encountered Idris in their spiritual visions.

== Name ==
The name Idris (إدريس) has been described as perhaps having the origin of meaning "interpreter," a claim consistent with the three-letter root of the name, darasa (Arabic: ﺩَﺭَﺱَ, lit. 'to study') Traditionally, Islam holds the prophet as having functioned an interpretive and mystical role and therefore this meaning garnered a general acceptance. Later Muslim sources, those of the eighth century, began to hold that Idris had two names, "Idris" and "Enoch", and other sources even stated that "Idris' true name is Enoch and that he is called Idris in Arabic because of his devotion to the study of the sacred books of his ancestors Adam and Seth". Therefore, these later sources also highlighted Idris as either meaning "interpreter" or having some meaning close to that of an interpretive role. Several of the classical commentators on the Quran, such as Al-Baydawi said he was "called Idris from the Arabic dars, meaning "to study", from his knowledge of divine mysteries".

== Quran ==
Idris is mentioned twice in the Quran. In both instances, he is described as a wise man.

In surah 19 of the Quran, Maryam, God says:

Also mention in the Book the case of Idris: He was a man of truth (and sincerity), (and) a prophet:
And We raised him to an exalted place.

— Quran 19:56–57 ^{(Yusuf Ali)}

Later, in surah 21, al-Anbiya, Idris is again praised:

And (remember) Isma'il, Idris, and Dhu al-Kifl, all (men) of constancy and patience;
We admitted them to Our mercy: for they were of the righteous ones.

— Quran 21:85–86 ^{(Yusuf Ali)}

== Muslim literature ==
According to later Muslim writings, Idris was born in Babylon, a city located in present-day Iraq. Before he received the Divine Revelation, he followed the rules revealed to Prophet Seth, the son of Adam. When Idris grew older, God bestowed Prophethood on him. During his lifetime, the people were not yet Muslims. Afterwards, Idris left his hometown of Babylon because a great number of the people committed many sins even after he urged them against it. Some of his people left with and accompanied Idris, hard as it was for them to leave their home.

They asked Prophet Idris: "If we leave Babylon, where will we find a place like it?" Prophet Idris said: "If we immigrate for the sake of Allah, He will provide for us". So the people went with Prophet Idris and they reached the land of Egypt. They saw the Nile River; Idris stood at its bank and mentioned Allah, the Exalted, by saying: "SubhanAllah" (Arabic: سُبْحَانَ ٱللَّٰه, lit. 'glory be to God').

Islamic literature narrates that Idris was made a prophet at around 40—which parallels the age when Muhammad began to spread the Prophetic Message—and lived during a time when people had begun to worship fire. Exegesis embellishes upon the lifetime of Idris, and states that the prophet divided his time into two. For three days of the week, Idris would preach to his people and for four days he would devote himself solely to the worship of God. Many early commentators, such as al-Tabari, credited Idris with possessing great wisdom and knowledge.

Islamic tafsir narrates that Idris was among "the first men to use the pen as well as being one of the first men to observe the movement of the stars and set out scientific weights and measures". These attributes remain consistent with the identification of Enoch with Idris, as these attributes make it clear that Idris would have most probably lived during the Generations of Adam, the same era during which Enoch lived. Ibn Arabi described Idris as the "prophet of the philosophers" and a number of works were attributed to him. Some scholars wrote commentaries on these supposed works, all while Idris was also credited with several inventions, including the art of making garments.

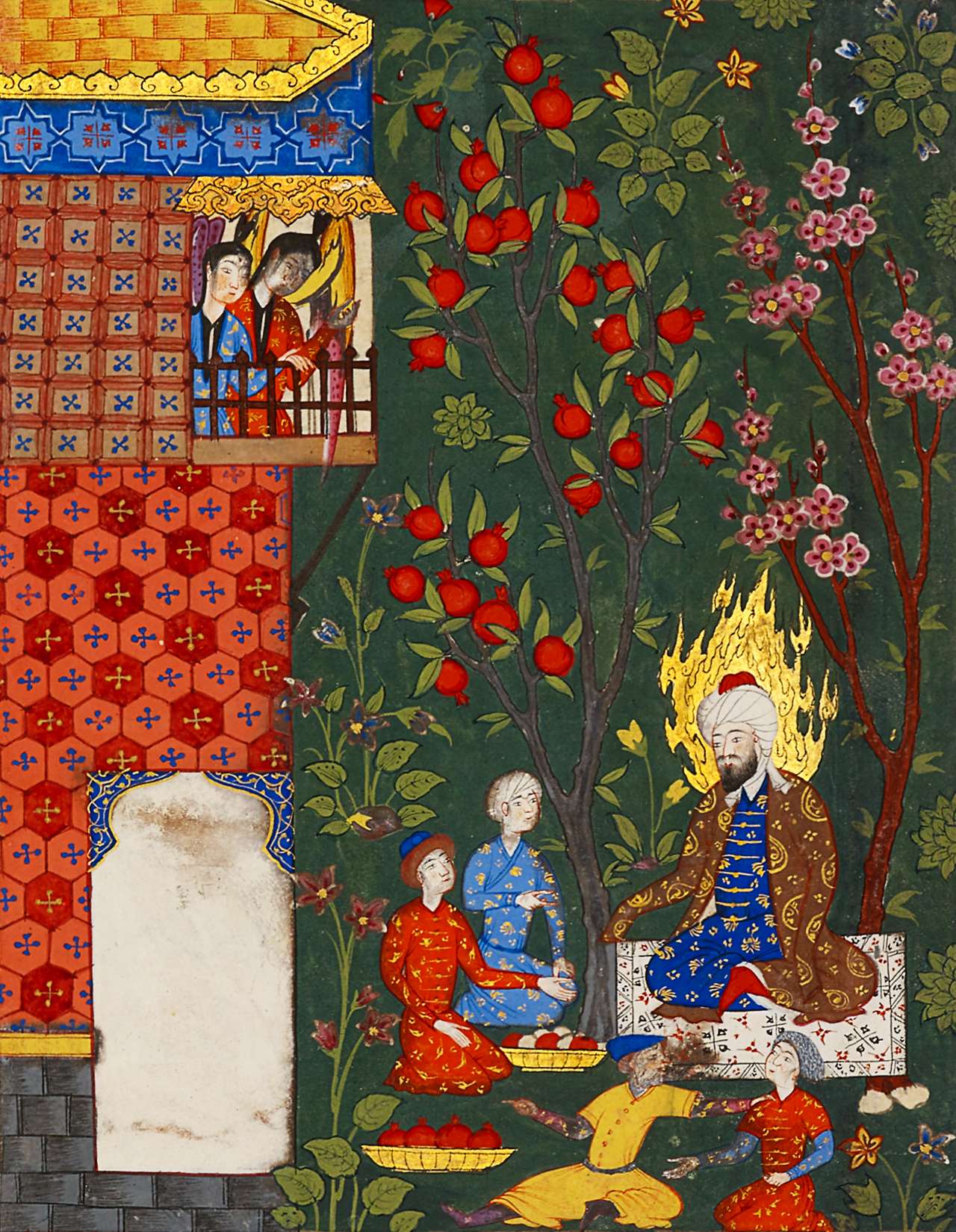
The Islamic prophet Idris in Paradise from a 1577 Qisas al-Anbiya manuscript.

The commentator Ibn Ishaq narrated that he was the first man to write with a pen. In his commentary on the Quranic verses 19:56–57, the commentator Ibn Kathir narrated "During the Night Journey, the Prophet passed by him [i.e. Idris] in the fourth heaven. In a hadith, Ibn Abbas asked Ka'b what was meant by the part of the verse which says, "And We raised him to a high station". Ka'b explained: Allah revealed to Idris: 'I would raise for you every day the same amount of the deeds of all Adam's children' – perhaps meaning of his time only. So Idris wanted to increase his deeds and devotion. A friend of his from the angels visited and Idris said to him: 'Allah has revealed to me such and such, so could you please speak to the angel of death, so I could increase my deeds'. The angel carried him on his wings and went up into the heavens. When they reached the fourth heaven, they met the angel of death who was descending down towards earth. The angel spoke to him about what Idris had spoken to him before. The angel of death said: 'But where is Idris?'. He replied, 'He is upon my back'. The angel of death said: 'How astonishing! I was sent and told to seize his soul in the fourth heaven. I kept thinking how I could seize it in the fourth heaven when he was on the earth?'. Then he took his soul out of his body, and that is what is meant by the verse: 'And We raised him to a high station'.

Early accounts of Idris' life attributed "thirty portions of revealed scripture" to him. Therefore, Idris was understood by many early commentators to be both a prophet as well as a messenger. Several modern commentators have linked this sentiment with Biblical apocrypha such as the Book of Enoch and the Second Book of Enoch.

== Identification ==
=== Enoch ===
Idris is generally accepted to be the same as Enoch, the patriarch who lived in the Generations of Adam. Many Quranic commentators, such as al-Tabari and Qadi Baydawi, identified Idris with Enoch. Baizawi said, "Idris was of the posterity of Seth and a forefather of Noah, and his name was Enoch (Ar. Akhnukh)". Bursalı İsmail Hakkı's commentary on Fuṣūṣ al-Ḥikam by Ibn Arabi.

Modern scholars, however, do not concur with this identification because they argue that it lacks definitive proof. As translator Abdullah Yusuf Ali says in note 2508 of his translation of the Quran:

Idris is mentioned twice in the Quran, viz., here and in Chapter 21, verse 85, where he is mentioned as among those who patiently persevered. His identification with the Biblical Enoch, may or may not be correct. Nor are we justified in interpreting verse 57 here as meaning the same thing as in Genesis, v. 24 ("God took him"), that he was taken up without passing through the portals of death. All we are told is he was a man of truth and sincerity, and a prophet, and that he had a high position among his people.

— Abdullah Yusuf Ali, The Holy Qur'an: Text, Translation and Commentary

With this identification, Idris's father becomes Yarid (يريد), his mother Barkanah, and his wife Aadanah. Idris's son Methuselah would eventually be the grandfather of Nuh (Noah). Hence Idris is identified as the great-grandfather of Noah.

=== Hermes Trismegistus ===
Antoine Faivre, in The Eternal Hermes (1995), has pointed out that Hermes Trismegistus (a syncretic combination of the Greek god Hermes and the Egyptian god Thoth) has a place in the Islamic tradition, although the name Hermes does not appear in the Quran. Hagiographers and chroniclers of the first centuries of the Islamic Hijrah quickly identified Hermes Trismegistus with Idris, the Prophet mentioned by the Quran in 19:56–57 and 21:85, whom the Arabs also identified with Enoch (cf. Genesis 5.18–24). Idris/Hermes was termed "Thrice-Wise" Hermes Trismegistus because he had a threefold origin. The first Hermes, comparable to Thoth, was a "civilizing hero", an initiator into the mysteries of the divine science and wisdom that animate the world; he carved the principles of this sacred science in Egyptian hieroglyphs. The second Hermes, in Babylon, was the initiator of Pythagoras. The third Hermes was the first teacher of alchemy. "A faceless prophet", writes the Islamicist Pierre Lory, "Hermes possesses no concrete or salient characteristics, differing in this regard from most of the major figures of the Bible and the Quran". A common interpretation of the representation of "Trismegistus" as "thrice great" recalls the three characterizations of Idris: as a messenger of god, or a prophet; as a source of wisdom, or hikmet (wisdom from hokhmah); and as a king of the world order, or a "sultanate". These are referred to as müselles bin ni'me.

The star-worshipping sect known as the Sabians of Harran also believed that their doctrine descended from Hermes Trismegistus.

=== Other identifications ===
Due to the linguistic dissimilarities of the name "Idris" with the aforementioned figures, several historians have proposed that this Quranic figure is derived from "Andreas", the immortality-achieving cook from the Syriac Alexander romance. In addition, historian Patricia Crone proposes that both "Idris" and "Andreas" are derived from the Akkadian epic of Atra-Hasis.

== See also ==
- Biblical narratives and the Quran
- Legends and the Quran
- Muhammad in Islam
- Prophets of Islam
- Stories of the prophets

== Bibliography ==
- Ibn Khaldun, Mukkadimma, tr. Rosenthal, i, 229, 240, n. 372; ii, 317, 328, 367ff.; iii, 213
- Ya'kubi, i, 9
- Kissat Idris, c. 1500, MS Paris, Bibl. Nat. Arabic 1947
- Djahiz, Tarbi, ed. Pellat, 26/40
- Sahih Bukhari, Prayer, I, Krehl, i, 99-100; Prophets, 4, Krehl, ii, 335
- A.E. Affifi, Mystical Philosophy of Ibn Arabi, Cambridge, 1939, 21, 110
- Tabari, History of the Prophets and Kings, I: From Creation to Flood, 172-177
- Balami, tr. Zotenberg, i, 95-99
- Tabari, Tafsir Tabari, xvi, 63ff., xvii, 52
- Masudi, Murudj, i, 73
- D. Chwolsson, Die Ssabier und der Sabismus, St. Petersburg, 1856
