= Enoch =

Biblical figure prior to Noah's flood

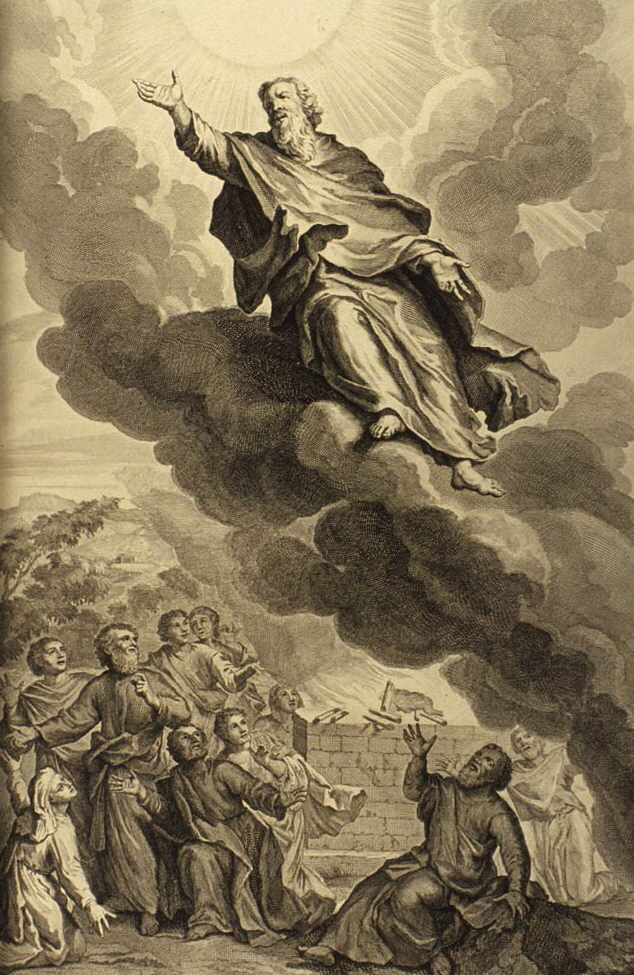
- Enoch from the 1728 Figures de la Bible illustrated by Gerard Hoet (1648–1733)
- Children: Methuselah and other sons and daughters
- Father: Jared

Enoch (/ˈiːnək/ Hebrew: חֲנוֹךְ, Modern: Ḥanōḵ, Tiberian: Ḥănōḵ; Greek: Ἑνώχ Henṓkh) is a biblical figure and patriarch prior to Noah's flood. He is the son of Jared and father of Methuselah.

The text of the Book of Genesis says Enoch lived 365 years before he was taken by God. The text reads that Enoch "walked with God: and he was no more; for God took him" (Gen 5:21–24), which is interpreted as Enoch entering heaven alive in some Jewish and Christian traditions, and interpreted differently in others.

Enoch is the subject of many Jewish and Christian traditions. He was considered the author of the Book of Enoch and also called the scribe of judgement. In the New Testament, the Gospel of Luke, the Epistle to the Hebrews, and the Epistle of Jude all refer to Enoch, the last of which also quotes from the Book of Enoch. In the Catholic Church, Eastern Orthodoxy, and Oriental Orthodoxy, he is venerated as a saint.

== Etymology ==
Several etymologies have been proposed for the name Enoch (חֲנוֹךְ Ḥănōḵ). Philo of Alexandria proposed it meant "your grace" (from Hebrew ḥēn), while Jerome derived it from the verb (ḥ-n-ḵ), meaning to train, initiate, dedicate, inaugurate, giving a meaning "dedicated". Modern scholars have proposed meanings including "follower", "inaugurated", and "wise" or "clever".

== Book of Genesis ==
Enoch appears in the Book of Genesis of the Pentateuch as the seventh of the ten pre-Deluge Patriarchs. Genesis states that each of the pre-Flood Patriarchs lived for several centuries. Genesis 5 provides a genealogy of these ten figures (from Adam to Noah), providing the age at which each fathered the next, and the age of each figure at death. Enoch is considered by many to be the exception, who is said to "not see death" (Hebrews 11:5). Enoch is denoted as a person who "walked with God" twice in Genesis 5 (Genesis 5:22 and Genesis 5:24); Noah is the only other pre-Deluge Patriarch given this designation in Genesis (Genesis 6:9). Furthermore, Genesis 5:22–24 states that Enoch lived for 365 years, which is shorter than other pre-Flood Patriarchs, who are all recorded as dying at over 700 years of age. The brief account of Enoch in Genesis 5 ends with the cryptic note that "he was not; for God took him." This happens 57 years after Adam's death and 69 years before Noah's birth.

== Books of Enoch (Apocryphal) ==
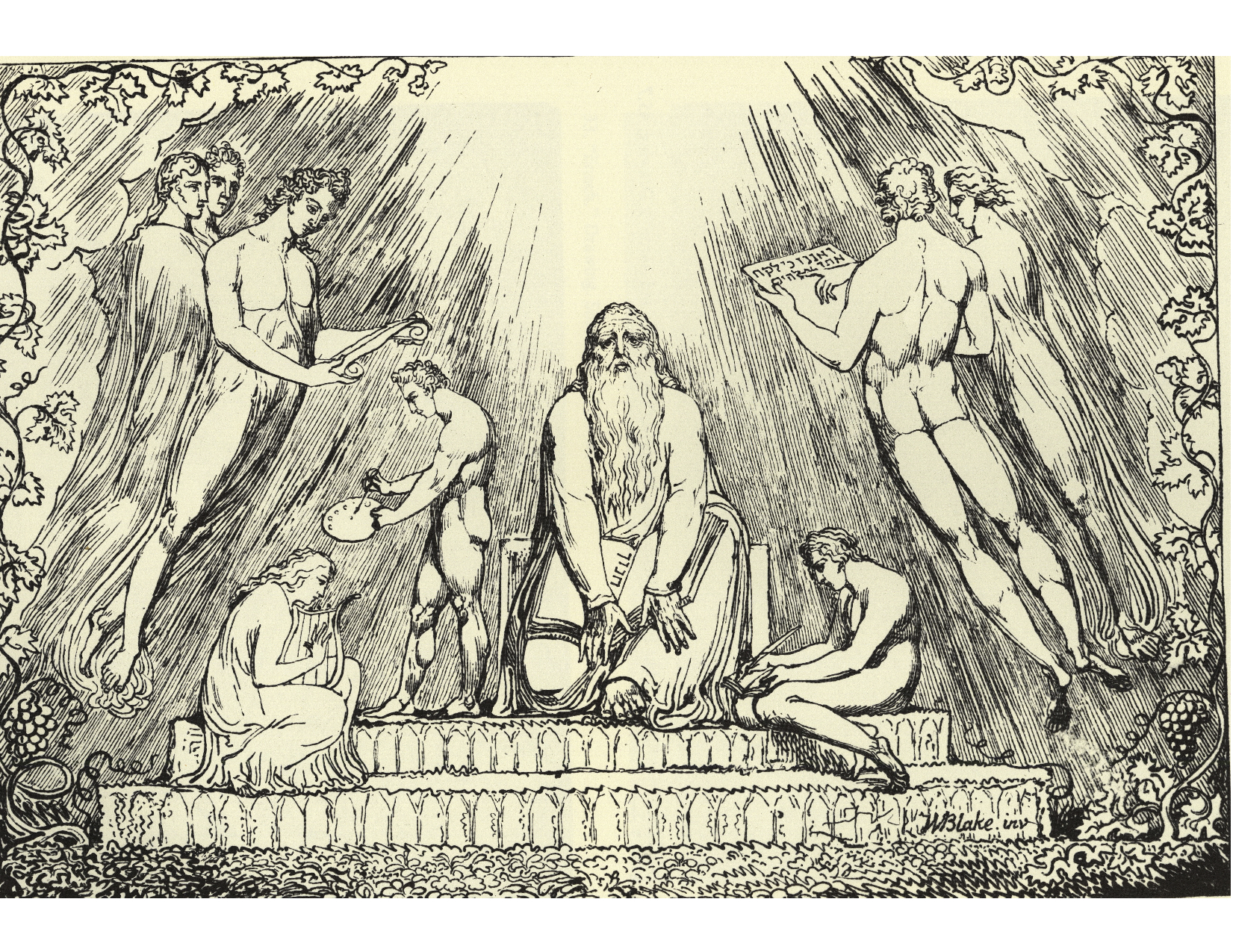
Enoch, lithograph by William Blake, 1807

Three extensive Apocrypha are attributed to Enoch:

- The Book of Enoch (aka 1 Enoch), composed in Hebrew or Aramaic and preserved in Ge'ez, first brought to Europe by James Bruce from Ethiopia and translated into English by August Dillmann and the Reverend Schoode – recognized by the Orthodox Tewahedo churches and usually dated between the third century BC and the first century AD.
- 2 Enoch (aka Book of the Secrets of Enoch), preserved in Old Church Slavonic, and first translated into English by William Morfill – usually dated to the first century AD.
- 3 Enoch, a Rabbinic text in Hebrew usually dated to the fifth century AD.

These recount how Enoch was taken up to Heaven and was appointed guardian of all the celestial treasures, chief of the archangels, and the immediate attendant on the Throne of God. He was subsequently taught all secrets and mysteries and, with all the angels at his back, fulfills of his own accord whatever comes out of the mouth of God, executing his decrees. Some esoteric literature, such as 3 Enoch, identifies Enoch as Metatron, the angel which communicates God's word. In consequence, Enoch was seen, by this literature and the Rabbinic kabbalah of Jewish mysticism, as the one who communicated God's revelation to Moses, and, in particular, as the dictator of the Book of Jubilees.

=== In The Book of Giants ===
The Book of Giants is a Jewish pseudepigraphal work from the third century BC and resembles the Book of Enoch. Fragments from at least six and as many as eleven copies were found among the Dead Sea Scrolls collections.

=== Septuagint ===
The third-century BC translators who produced the Septuagint in Koine Greek rendered the phrase "God took him" with the Greek verb metatithemi (μετατίθημι) meaning moving from one place to another. Sirach 44:16, from about the same period, states that "Enoch pleased God and was translated into paradise that he may give repentance to the nations." The Greek word used here for paradise, paradeisos (παράδεισος), was derived from an ancient Persian word meaning "enclosed garden", and was used in the Septuagint to describe the garden of Eden. Later, however, the term became synonymous for heaven, as is the case here.

=== In Classical Rabbinism ===
In classical Rabbinical literature, there are various views of Enoch. The view in the Targum Pseudo-Jonathan is that of a pious man, taken to Heaven and receiving the title of Safra rabba (Great scribe). After Christianity was completely separated from Judaism, this view became the prevailing rabbinical idea of Enoch's character and exaltation.

According to Rashi (from Genesis Rabbah), "Enoch was a righteous man, but he could easily be swayed to return to do evil. Therefore, the Holy One, blessed be He, hastened and took him away and caused him to die before his time. For this reason, Scripture changed [the wording] in [the account of] his demise and wrote, 'and he was no longer' in the world to complete his years."

Among the minor Midrashim, esoteric attributes of Enoch are expanded upon. In the Sefer Hekalot, Rabbi Ishmael is described as having visited the Seventh Heaven, where he met Enoch, who claims that earth had, in his time, been corrupted by the demons Shammazai, and Azazel, and so Enoch was taken to Heaven to prove that God was not cruel. Similar traditions are recorded in Sirach. Later elaborations of this interpretation treated Enoch as having been a pious ascetic, who, called to mix with others, preached repentance, and gathered (despite the small number of people on Earth) a vast collection of disciples, to the extent that he was proclaimed king. Under his wisdom, peace is said to have reigned on earth, to the extent that he is summoned to Heaven to rule over the sons of God.

== In Christianity ==
=== New Testament ===
The New Testament contains three references to Enoch.

- The first is a brief mention in one of the genealogies of the ancestors of Jesus in the Gospel of Luke. (Luke 3:37).
- The second mention is in the Epistle to the Hebrews which says, "By faith Enoch was translated that he should not see death; and was not found, because God had translated him: for before his translation he had this testimony, that he pleased God." (Hebrews 11:5 KJV). This suggests he did not experience the mortal death ascribed to Adam's other descendants, which is consistent with Genesis 5:24 KJV, which says, "And Enoch walked with God: and he [was] not; for God took him."
- The third mention is in the Epistle of Jude (1:14–15) where the author attributes to "Enoch, the Seventh from Adam" a passage not found in Catholic and Protestant canons of the Old Testament. The quotation is believed by most modern scholars to be taken from 1 Enoch 1:9 which exists in Greek, in Ge'ez (as part of the Ethiopian Orthodox canon), and also in Aramaic among the Dead Sea Scrolls. The same scholars recognise that 1 Enoch 1:9 itself is a midrash of Deuteronomy 33:2.

The introductory phrase "Enoch, the Seventh from Adam" is also found in 1 Enoch (1 En. 60:8), though not in the Old Testament. In the New Testament this Enoch prophesies "to" (Note: The use of dative toutois in the Greek text (προεφήτευσεν δὲ καὶ τούτοις instead of the normal genitive with προφητεύω prophēteuō peri auton, "concerning them") has occasioned discussion among commentators including: Ben Witherington, John Twycross, and Cox S.) ungodly men, that God shall come with His holy ones to judge and convict them (Jude 1:14–15).

=== Influence in Christianity ===
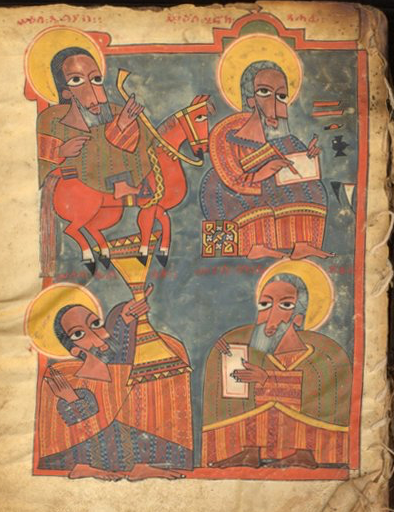
Enoch (above right) in the ethiopic Enoch manuscript Gunda Gunde 151, depicted as scribe (Geʽez: ጸሓፊ ṣaḥāfi). On the left Elijah (above) and Elisha (bottom) are depicted, the other scribe (right bottom) is Ezra.

The Book of Enoch was excluded from both the Hebrew Tanakh and the Greek translation of the Hebrew Bible, the Septuagint. It was not considered canon by either Jewish or early Christian readers. However, Church Fathers such as Justin Martyr, Athenagoras of Athens, Irenaeus, Clement of Alexandria, Origen, Tertullian, and Lactantius all speak highly of Enoch and contain many allusions to the Book of Enoch as well as in some instances advocating explicitly for the use of the Book of Enoch as Scripture.

The letter of Jude's citation of the Book of Enoch as prophetic text encouraged acceptance and usage of the Book of Enoch in early Christian circles. The main themes of Enoch about the Watchers corrupting humanity were commonly mentioned in early literature. This positive treatment of the Book of Enoch was associated with millennialism which was popular in the early Church. When amillennialism began to be common in Christianity, the Book of Enoch, being incompatible with amillennialism, came to be widely rejected. After the split of the Oriental Orthodox Churches in the 5th century, use of the Book of Enoch was limited primarily to the Oriental Orthodox Churches. Eventually, the usage of the Book of Enoch became limited to Ethiopian circles of the Oriental Orthodox Churches.

Another common element that some Church Fathers, like John of Damascus, spoke of, was that they considered Enoch to be one of the two witnesses mentioned in the Book of Revelation. This view still has many supporters today in Christianity.

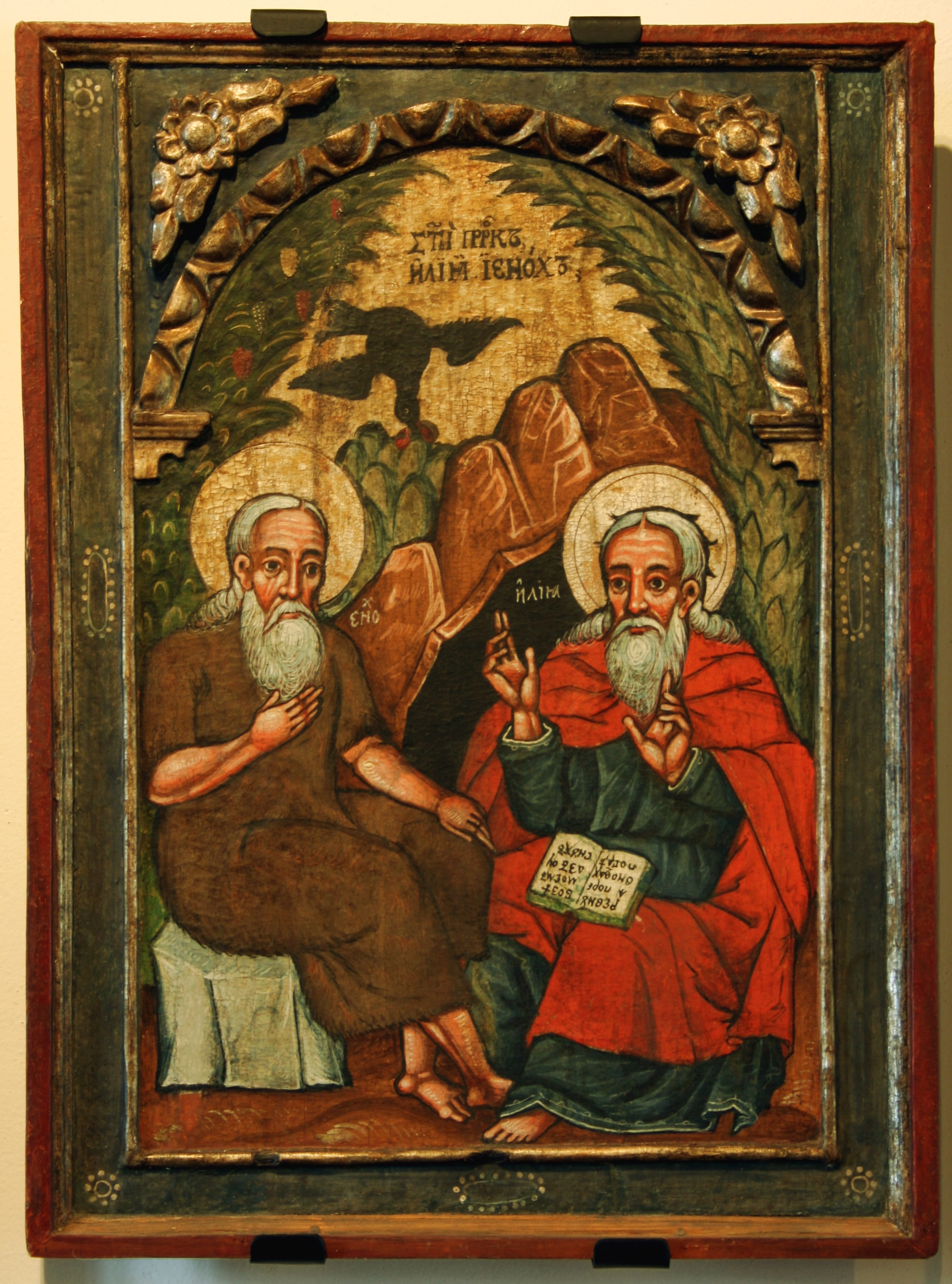
Elijah and Enoch – seventeenth-century icon, Historic Museum in Sanok, Poland

=== Latter Day Saint theology ===
Among the Latter Day Saint movement and particularly in The Church of Jesus Christ of Latter-day Saints (LDS Church), Enoch is viewed as having founded an exceptionally righteous city, named Zion, in the midst of an otherwise wicked world. This view is encountered in the standard works, the Pearl of Great Price and the Doctrine and Covenants, which states that not only Enoch, but the entire peoples of the city of Zion, were taken off this earth without death, because of their piety. (Zion is defined as "the pure in heart" and this city of Zion will return to the earth at the Second Coming of Jesus.) The Doctrine and Covenants further states that Enoch prophesied that one of his descendants, Noah, and his family, would survive a Great Flood and thus carry on the human race and preserve the Scripture. The Book of Moses in the Pearl of Great Price includes chapters that give an account of Enoch's preaching, visions, and conversations with God. They provide details concerning the wars, violence and natural disasters in Enoch's day, but also reference the miracles performed by Enoch.

The Book of Moses is itself an excerpt from Joseph Smith's translation of the Bible, which is published in full, complete with these chapters concerning Enoch, by Community of Christ, in the Joseph Smith Translation of the Bible, where it appears as part of the Book of Genesis. D&C 104:24 (CofC) / 107:48–49 (LDS) states that Adam ordained Enoch to the higher priesthood (now called the priesthood of Melchizedek, after the great king and high priest) at age 25, that he was 65 when Adam blessed him, and that he lived for an additional 365 years until he and his city were blessed, making Enoch 430 years old at the time that "he was not, for God took him" (Genesis 5:24).

Additionally in LDS theology, Enoch is implied to be the scribe who recorded Adam's blessings and prophecies at Adam-ondi-Ahman, as recorded in D&C 107:53–57 (LDS) / D&C 104:29b (CofC).

== In Islam ==
Most Muslims identify Enoch as the Qur'anic prophet Idris. However, some etymological research suggests that the Greek version of the name Ezra (Esdras) is a more plausible origin for the name Idris.

Aside from Enoch and Ezra, Idris is also frequently identified as Hermes Trismegistus. This Hermetic identification of Idris isn't necessarily exclusive to his identification as a Biblical figure. While there is some dispute over whether or not Idris was Hermes Trismegistus, those who interpret Idris as Hermes Trismegistus also generally agree he was a Biblical prophet.

== In Theosophy ==
According to the theosophist Helena Blavatsky, the Jewish Enoch (or the Greek demigod Hermes) was "the first Grand Master and Founder of Freemasonry."

== In Samaritanism ==
According to the Asatir, Enoch was buried on Mount Ebal.

== Genealogy ==
Adam (Note: Genesis 4:1)	Eve
Cain	Abel (Note: Genesis 4:2)	Seth (Note: Genesis 4:25; 5:3)
Enoch (Note: Genesis 4:17)	Enos (Note: Genesis 4:26; 5:6–7)
Irad (Note: Genesis 4:18)	Kenan (Note: Genesis 5:9–10)
Mehujael	Mahalalel (Note: Genesis 5:12–13)
Methushael	Jared (Note: Genesis 5:15–16)
Adah (Note: Genesis 4:19)	Lamech	Zillah	Enoch (Note: Genesis 5:18–19)
Jabal (Note: Genesis 4:20)	Jubal (Note: Genesis 4:21)	Tubal-Cain (Note: Genesis 4:22)	Naamah	Methuselah (Note: Genesis 5:21–22)
Lamech (Note: Genesis 5:25–26)
Noah (Note: Genesis 5:28–30)
Shem (Note: Genesis 5:32)	Ham	Japheth

== See also ==
- Adam and Eve (LDS Church)
- Entering heaven alive
- Hermes Trismegistus
- Metatron
- New Adam
