= Priesthood of Melchizedek =

Priest-king role in Abrahamic religions

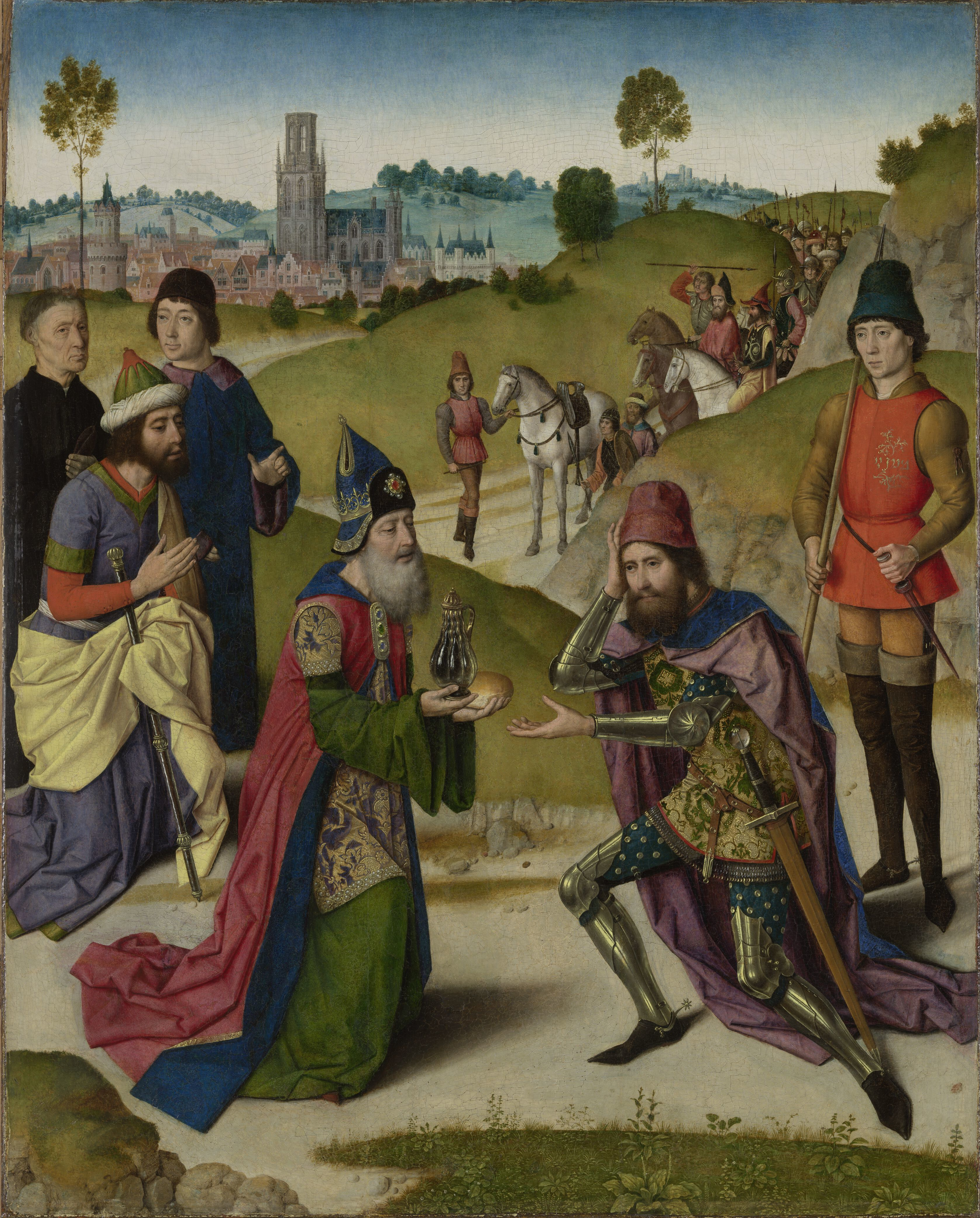
Meeting of Abraham and Melchizedek – by Dieric Bouts the Elder, 1464–67

The priesthood of Melchizedek is a role in Abrahamic religions, modelled on Melchizedek, combining the dual position of king and priest.

== Hebrew Bible ==
Melchizedek is a king and priest appearing in the Book of Genesis. The name means "King of Righteousness", a name echoing kingly and priestly functions. He is the first individual to be given the title Kohen (priest) in the Hebrew Bible.

=== In Psalms ===
In the King James Version the Book of Psalms 110:4 names Melchizedek as representative of the priestly line through which a future king of Israel's Davidic line was ordained. Alternatively, it is suggested this term was here intended to be treated as an agglutinated improper noun, and thus translated as rightful king rather than left as a proper name Melchizedek; this interpretation is taken by some modern translations, such as the New JPS Tanakh.

== In Judaism ==
The Law of Moses stipulates that only the male descendants of Aaron be commissioned to serve as Kohenim priests before Yahweh and the Jewish nation. This commission is believed in Judaism to be "a covenant of everlasting priesthood" and not eligible for replacement by other tribes of Israel.

Judaic midrash (exegesis) identifies Melchizedek with Shem the son of Noah. Although the Book of Genesis affirms that Melchizedek was "priest of God Most High" (Genesis 14:18), the Midrash and Babylonian Talmud maintain that the priesthood held by Melchizedek, who pre-dated the patriarch Levi by five generations (Melchizedek pre-dates Aaron by six generations; Abraham, Isaac, Jacob, Levi, Kehoth, Amram, Aaron), was given in his stead to Abraham who, in turn, passed it on to his patrilineal descendants, Isaac and then to Jacob. Midrashic literature attributes this transition as a consequence due to Melchizedek preceding the name of Abraham to that of God, such as in the Midrash Rabbah to Genesis, while some Jewish commentators, such as Chaim ibn Attar, write that Melchizedek gave the priesthood to Abraham willingly.

Maimonides, in his Mishneh Torah, explains that Jacob separated his son Levi from his other sons and appointed him to instruct and teach the ways of "service to God", specifically the servicial methods used by his forefather Abraham, to his brothers. He also instructed his sons to perpetuate this status of Levi ("Shevet Levi") for eternity (Maimonides, Avodah Zorah 1:15). For the prelude of this choice see Targum Jonathan to Genesis 32:25, and/or Pirkei de-Rabbi Eliezer ch. 37. In midrash, it is written that Amram the son of Kohath the son of Levi was the spiritual leader of the sons of Jacob ("Israel") during their Egyptian Bondage. Following his death, his post was assumed by his son Aaron.

At the time of the erection of the Tabernacle, the bible says that God commanded Moses to appoint Aaron and his sons to the Jewish priestly service as a precondition to God revealing his Shekhinah amongst the nation of Israel:

And Aaron and his sons I will sanctify to serve me and I will dwell amidst the sons of Israel and I will be to them a God, and they will know that I (am) God their Master that took them out from the land of Egypt (in order that) I (will) dwell in their midst

— Exodus 29:44-46

The majority of Chazalic literature attributes the primary character of psalm 110 as King David who was a "righteous king" (מלכי צדק) of Salem (Jerusalem) and, like Melchizedek, had certain priest-like responsibilities, while the Babylonian Talmud understands the chapter as referring to Abram who was victorious in battling to save his nephew Lot and merited priesthood. The Zohar defines the noted Melchizedek as referring to Aaron, High Priest of Israel.

== In Christianity ==
Christians believe that Jesus is the Messiah spoken of as "a priest forever in the order of Melchizedek" (Ps. 110:4), and so Jesus plays the role of the king-priest once and for all. According to the writer of Hebrews (7:13-17) Jesus is considered a priest in the order of Melchizedek because, like Melchizedek, Jesus was not a descendant of Aaron, and thus would not qualify for the Jewish priesthood under the Law of Moses.

Melchizedek is referred to again in Hebrews 5:6-10; Hebrews 6:20; Hebrews 7:1-21: "Thou art a priest forever after the order of Melchizedek"; and Hebrews 8:1.

And verily they that are of the sons of Levi, who receive the office of the priesthood, have a commandment to take tithes of the people according to the law, that is, of their brethren, though they come out of the loins of Abraham: But he whose descent is not counted from them received tithes of Abraham, and blessed him that had the promises" (Hebrews 7:5-6).

If therefore perfection were by the Levitical priesthood (for under it the people received the law), what further need was there that another priest should rise after the order of Melchizedek, and not be called after the order of Aaron? For the priesthood being changed, there is made of necessity a change also of the law" (Hebrews 7:11-12).

The author of the Epistle to the Hebrews in the New Testament discussed this subject considerably, listing the following reasons for why the priesthood of Melchizedek is superior to the Aaronic priesthood:

1. Abraham paid tithes to Melchizedek; later, the Levites would receive tithes from their countrymen. Since Aaron was in Abraham's loins then, it was as if the Aaronic priesthood were paying tithes to Melchizedek. (Heb. 7:4-10)
2. The one who blesses is always greater than the one being blessed. Thus, Melchizedek was greater than Abraham. As Levi was yet in the loins of Abraham, it follows that Melchizedek is greater than Levi. (Heb. 7:7-10)
3. If the priesthood of Aaron were effective, God would not have called a new priest in a different order in Psalm 110. (Heb. 7:11)
4. The basis of the Aaronic priesthood was ancestry; the basis of the priesthood of Melchizedek is everlasting life. That is, there is no interruption due to a priest's death. (Heb. 7:8,15-16,23-25)
5. Unlike the other high priests, Christ does not need to offer sacrifices day after day, first for his own sins, and then for the sins of the people. (Heb. 7:26-27)
6. The priesthood of Melchizedek is more effective because it required a single sacrifice once and for all (Jesus), while the Levitical priesthood made endless sacrifices. (Heb. 7:27)
7. The Aaronic priests serve (or, rather, served) in an earthly copy and shadow of the heavenly Temple, which Jesus serves in. (Heb. 8:5)

The epistle goes on to say that the covenant of Jesus is superior to the covenant the Levitical priesthood is under. Some Christians hold that Melchizedek was a type of Christ, and some other Christians hold that Melchizedek indeed was Christ. Reasons provided include that Melchizedek's name means "king of righteousness" according to the author of Hebrews, and that being king of Salem makes Melchizedek the "king of peace". Heb. 7:3 states, "Without father or mother, without genealogy, without beginning of days or end of life, like the Son of God he (Melchizedek) remains a priest forever." Melchizedek gave Abraham bread and wine, which Christians generally consider to pre-figure the Eucharist, being symbols or sacraments of the body and blood of Jesus Christ, and perhaps a sacrifice to confirm a covenant.

=== Catholicism ===
Catholics believe that Melchizedek was a prefiguration of the priesthood of Christ(CCC 1544). In Genesis 14:18, Melchizedek offers a sacrifice of bread and wine. Catholics believe that Christ therefore fulfilled the prophecy of Ps 110:4, that he would be a priest "after the order of Melchizedek" at the Last Supper, when he initiated the sacrifice of the New Covenant with his disciples—his body and blood under the appearances of bread and wine. Melchizedek and his offering are explicitly referenced as a foreshadowing of the Sacrifice of the Mass in the liturgical prayers of the Roman Canon of the Catholic Mass. Catholic priests, in the doctrine of the Catholic Church, are priests inasmuch as they participate(CCC 1547) in the one priesthood of Christ according to the order of Melchizedek due to their ordination.

=== Latter Day Saint movement ===
In the Latter Day Saint movement, the Melchizedek priesthood is viewed as the priesthood authority of the Twelve Apostles of Jesus, as well as Old Testament prophets, higher than that of the Aaronic authority of John the Baptist and of the Levites.

According to the Book of Mormon, the prophet Melchizedek preached repentance to the people of a wicked city, and established peace in the land. According to Alma 13:18, Melchizedek's efforts earned him the title "the prince of peace". Of particular importance is the parallel Hebrew meaning of "prince of peace" and "king of Salem", another of Melchizedek's titles, and his association with (or typology of) Jesus Christ, who is also called the Prince of Peace (Isa. 9:2), as well as the Great High Priest (Heb. 4:14). Later, Melchizedek's people were, according to Joseph Smith, caught up, or "translated", to meet the city of Enoch (Joseph Smith Translation of Genesis 14:34). The priesthood is referred to by the name of Melchizedek because he was such a great high priest (Doctrine & Covenants Section 107:2). The Doctrine and Covenants states that before Melchizedek's day the Priesthood "was called the Holy Priesthood, after the Order of the Son of God. But out of respect or reverence to the name of the Supreme Being, to avoid the too-frequent repetition of his name, they, the church, in the ancient days, called that priesthood after Melchizedek, or the Melchizedek Priesthood" (Doctrine and Covenants Section 107:3-4). Initially, the only Melchizedek Priesthood office in the Latter Day Saint movement was Elder. Later revelations extended the office complement to Seventy, High Priest, Patriarch and Apostle.
