= Hikmet Vurgun =

Turkish handball coach

Sport
- Sport: Handball

Teams managed
- Years: Team
- 2007–2014: İzmir BB GSK
- 2014–: Ardeşen GSK

Hikmet Vurgun is a Turkish handball coach, academic for physical education and sports, and a former handball player.

== Private life ==
Hikmet Vurgun is married to Nilgün Akış, also a handball coach, academic and former handball player.

== Academic career ==
Vurgun graduated from Ege University in İzmir and obtained a master's degree in 2000. Pursuing an academic career, he was employed in 2004 as a research assistant at the same university.

He taught sports coaching in his capacity as assistant professor at the Physical Education and Sports College of the Celal Bayar University in Manisa. In 2014, he was admitted to the faculty of Recep Tayyip Erdoğan University in conjunction with his move to the Ardeşen GSK in Rize.

== Player ==
Vurgun began his sports career as a handball player in İzmir.

== Coach ==
=== Club ===
In 2007, Vurgun attended a coaching course offered by the European Handball Federation. The same year, he was appointed head coach of İzmir BB GSK's women's handball team. In June 2014, he transferred to the Rize-based team Ardeşen GSK.

=== National team ===
After retiring from competitive handball, Vurgun continued his sports career as a coach. In 2007, he was appointed assistant to Péter Kovács, the Hungarian head coach of the Turkey women's national handball team. After serving as assistant coach until 2010, he was promoted to the position of head coach and manager of the national team.

== Works ==
- Vurgun, Hikmet (2000). Elit hentbolcülerin oynadıkları pozisyonlara göre bazı fizyolojik test parametrelerinin karşılaştırılması (in Turkish). Ege Üniversitesi/Sağlık Bilimleri Enstitüsü. Archived from the original on 2021-02-23.
- Koçak, Aytunç; Ekin Özgür Aktaş; Serkan Çınarlı; Hikmet Vurgun (2014-03-16). "Uluslararası ve Türkiye Hentbol Federasyonları Oyun Kurallarından, Madde 4.9 un Tıbbi ve Adli Yönden Tartışılması". Hukuk Fakültesi Dergisi (in Turkish). 8 (1). Erciyes Üniversitesi.
