= Translation (Mormonism) =

In Mormonism, being changed into an immortal state without dying

In Mormonism, translation refers to being physically changed by God from a mortal human being to an immortal human being. A person that has been translated is referred to as a translated being. According to Mormonism, Enoch, Elijah, Moses, John the Apostle, the Three Nephites, and others were translated.

A translated being is akin to a resurrected person, with the exception that a translated being has never died and has a body with less power than a resurrected being. According to Parley P. Pratt, ordinary human beings are said to have a telestial body; people who are translated are said to have a terrestrial body; and people who are resurrected are said to have a celestial body, but all the terms also refer to the three degrees of resurrected being, as per 1 Corinthians 15 and Doctrine and Covenants 76.

== State of terrestrial body ==
Those who are translated beings are said to be "changed so that they do not experience pain or death until their resurrection to immortality." Both translated and resurrected beings are eternally young and fit, not subject to illness or injury and spend their existences as ministering angels doing things that require physical bodies to perform; for example, where a disembodied spirit can record events as a witness and offer comfort or advice, a physical body is required to perform ordinances such as laying on of hands.

According to Parley P. Pratt, a translated being has a terrestrial body. The terrestrial body would be different from the terrestrial glory of heaven, just as the presentworld is considered "telestial" but is not the telestial glory of heaven. Translated beings with terrestrial bodies can appear or disappear the way the resurrected Jesus did in the 24th chapter of Luke. However, those who have resurrected "celestial" bodies have more power than those with terrestrial bodies. A person who has been translated still has to be resurrected after the Second Coming of Christ to attain a celestial body.

== Latter-day Saint beliefs ==
Latter-day Saints believe that a select number of individuals have been translated. Some of these individuals have been admitted into heaven to await their formal resurrection, and others have been permitted to remain upon the earth until that time. The following are a list of persons that Latter-day Saints believe were translated:

- Enoch
- People of Enoch's City of Zion
- Moses
- Elijah
- John the Apostle
- Three Unnamed Nephites
- Alma, son of Alma

Many Latter-day Saints believe that there are also other persons who have been translated, some of whom may also have been taken to heaven; there is some LDS scriptural support for this belief.

== Translation in other Christian groups ==
Similar beliefs about "translation" were also held by other religious groups and sects at various times and places, such as the Buchanites in 18th century Scotland.

St Clement, a 1st-century bishop of Rome, used the term "translation" in the same context in his first letter, "The Letter of The Church of Rome to The Church of Corinth", as translated by Cyril C. Richardson. It appears in 9:3.

== Annalee Skarin ==
Annalee Skarin was a woman who had been raised in the LDS Church who claimed to have invented a meditation technique by which anyone could translate themselves directly into Heaven. She also claimed in her book to be able to see directly into the Spirit World with what is called in Mormonism the spiritual eye. She wrote a book about it called Ye Are Gods. Originally a devout Mormon, she was excommunicated from the Church shortly after publication of her first book, Ye Are Gods, because it was perceived by high-ranking members that the book's contents seriously blasphemed against Mormon belief. Many proponents of New Age thought that she, along with her husband Reason Skarin, indeed achieved physical immortality (been translated) after her clothes were found in her room in 1952 and she totally disappeared, and he disappeared soon afterward.

However, it was later shown that she had faked her "translation" and gone into hiding with her husband in order to increase sales of her books. She hid away from the Mormon corridor by going to southern Oregon and later living in the far north of California. It was later proven that she physically died of natural causes.

== See also ==
- Ascended master
- Demigod
- Enlightenment
- Entering heaven alive
- Godling
- Rapture
