= Divani-hikmat =

Divani-hikmat ("House of Wisdom") was one of the first literary councils of Azerbaijan. It was first held in 1820–1830 in Ganja city. The head of the council was the poet Mirza Shafi Vazeh. In 1841 it was shifted to Tbilisi and he began to operate it in Tbilisi during 1841–1846. At meetings of Divani-hikmat there were Russian, German and other nationalities besides Azerbaijani poets. Until the death of Mirza Shafi (until 1852) "Divani-hikmat" ran in Tbilisi and until the death of Mir Mehdi Naji (until 1882) in Ganja.
