= Ahmed Hikmat Shakir =

Iraqi terrorist facilitator implicated in 9/11 atracks

Ahmed Hikmat Shakir is an Iraqi terrorist facilitator implicated in the September 11 attacks. While based in Malaysia, Shakir served as an al-Qaeda “fixer” and provided logistical support in the planning of the attacks on the USS Cole, the World Trade Center, the Pentagon and other terrorist attacks. Shakir was arrested in Qatar days after the 9/11 attacks, but was subsequently released and ultimately returned to Iraq.

== History ==
In 1999, Shakir began working as a VIP greeter for Malaysian Airlines, a position he obtained with the help of a contact at the Iraqi embassy, as reported by The Weekly Standard. On January 5, 2000, Shakir escorted September 11 hijacker Khalid al Mihdhar to a waiting car and joined him for al-Qaeda planning meetings in Kuala Lumpur, later named the Kuala Lumpur al-Qaeda Summit. After the meetings, Shakir reported to work at the airport twice before disappearing.

Six days after the 9/11 attacks, on September 17, 2001, Qatari authorities searched his person and apartment and arrested Shakir. During the search, authorities found contact information for multiple senior-level al-Qaeda members tied to the 1993 World Trade Center bombing, Operation Bojinka, the 1998 United States embassy bombings, and the attack on USS. Cole both on his body and in his apartment. Shakir's contacts included the brother of 9/11 architect Khalid Sheikh Mohammed and Mamdouh Mahmud Salim.

American officials were reportedly aware that Shakir was acting an associate of two 9/11 hijackers who attended the January 2000 meeting in Malaysia and FBI officials were “eager to interview Shakir.” However, Qatari authorities released Shakir, allowing him to flee the country. Shakir was detained in Amman, Jordan en route to Iraq on October 21, 2001, and was held in Jordan for three months before being allowed to return to Iraq.

== Confusion over names ==
In 2004, allegations emerged that Shakir, as a senior-ranking al-Qaeda member, was an officer in Saddam Hussein's private militia. Iraqi military documents named Lt. Col. Hikmat Shakir Ahmad as a member of Fedayeen Saddam. The Weekly Standard published an article which speculated that the al-Qaeda member was a member of Saddam Hussein's militia. However, a 2004 article in the Washington Post quoted a senior Bush administration official who believed that names indicated two different individuals. The 9/11 Commission Report claimed that despite the confusion over Shakir's identity, the al-Qaeda member was still in police custody in Qatar when the Iraqi Fedayeen colonel with a similar name was in Iraq.
