= Hikmat Mizban Ibrahim =

Finance Minister under the government of Saddam Hussein

Governor of the Central Bank of Iraq
- In office 1985–1987
- President: Saddam Hussein
- Preceded by: Hassan Tawfiq Al-Najafi
- Succeeded by: Subhi Nadhem Frankool

Minister of Finance
- In office May 1994 – April 2003
- President: Saddam Hussein
- Preceded by: Ahmad Husayn Khudayir as-Samarrai

Deputy Prime Minister

Personal details
- Born: 1934
- Died: 27 January 2012 (aged 77–78)
- Occupation: Economist

Hikmat Mizban Ibrahim al-Azzawi (1934 – 27 January 2012) was an Iraqi politician who was a Deputy Prime Minister and twice Minister of Finance under the government of Saddam Hussein.

Azzawi originally trained as an economist. He was arrested in 1960 protesting against the government of Iraqi General Abd al-Karim Qasim. He joined the Arab Socialist Ba'ath Party in 1968 and was named undersecretary of state for commerce. He was fired from all his official designations in 1982 and expelled from the party, until the 1985 when he became Governor of the Central Bank of Iraq, in April 1987 he was humiliated in a public meeting and dismissed for refusing to transfer a large sum of money at the demand of one of the Saddam's uncles.

Saddam Hussein forced him back into the position of Minister of Finance in 1995.

In July 1999 he was given the honorary title of Deputy Prime Minister. After the United States-led Invasion of Iraq in 2003, he was listed as number 45 (8 of Diamonds) on the Iraqi most-wanted playing cards. He was peacefully detained from his house in Baghdad on 19 April 2003 by Iraqi police and handed over to the US military.

He died in prison of cancer.
