= Hikmet (magazine) =

Sufi magazine in Ottoman Empire (1910–1911)

Ḥikmet
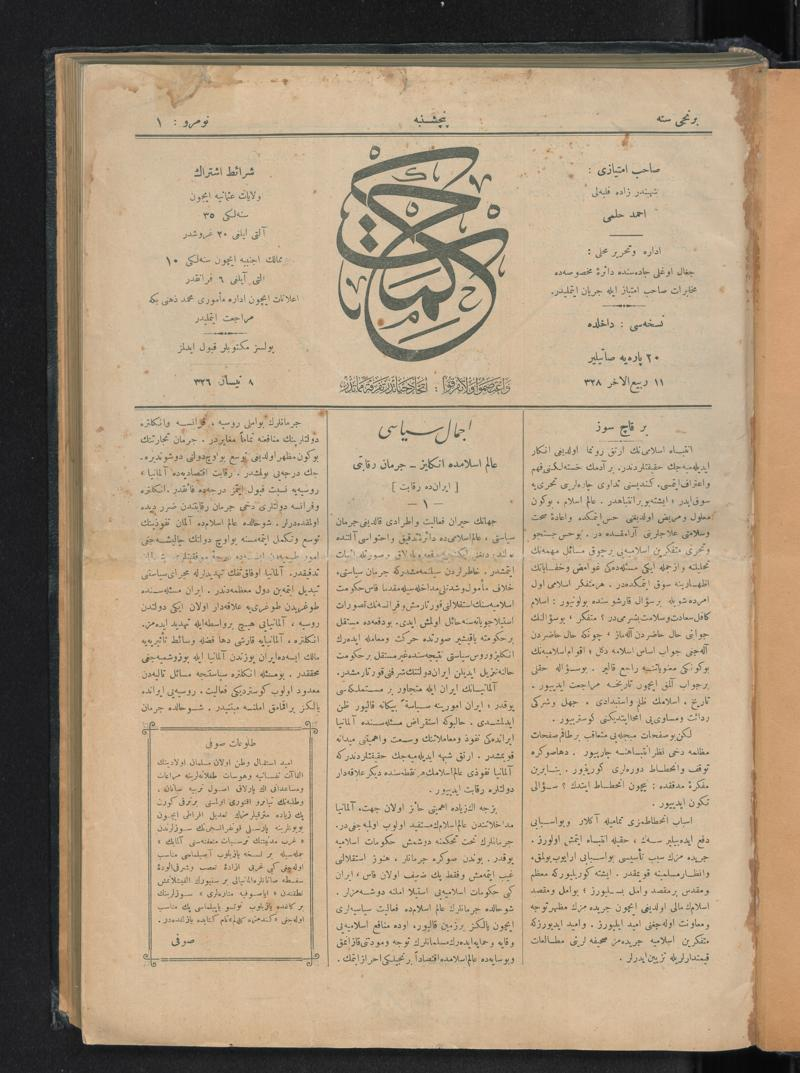
- Categories: Sufism
- Publisher: Şehbenderzâde Filibeli Ahmed Hilmi
- First issue: 22 April 1910
- Final issue: 22 September 1911
- Country: Ottoman Empire
- Based in: Istanbul
- Language: Ottoman-Turkish
- Website: Ḥikmet

The weekly journal Hikmet (Ottoman-Turkish: حکمت; DMG: Ḥikmet; English: "Wisdom"), published in Istanbul from 1910 to 1911, was one of the first sufistic journals that were founded during the Second Constitutional Period. It was published by Şehbenderzâde Filibeli Ahmed Hilmi (1865-1914), a Turkish Sufi, author and thinker. The journal had the subtitle “Unity is life and dissension is death“ („İttihad hayattır, tefrika memattır“). Two volumes with a total of 79 issues were published and covered political, economic and social topics as well as articles on philosophy, Islamic mysticism and sufistic literature. Hilmi's criticism of the İttihat ve Terakki Cemiyeti (“Committee of Union and Progress”) ultimately led to the suspension of Hikmet. In addition to Hikmet, Hilmi also published the journals Çaylak, İttihat-ı İslam and Coşkun Kalender.
