= Son of God =

Religious title

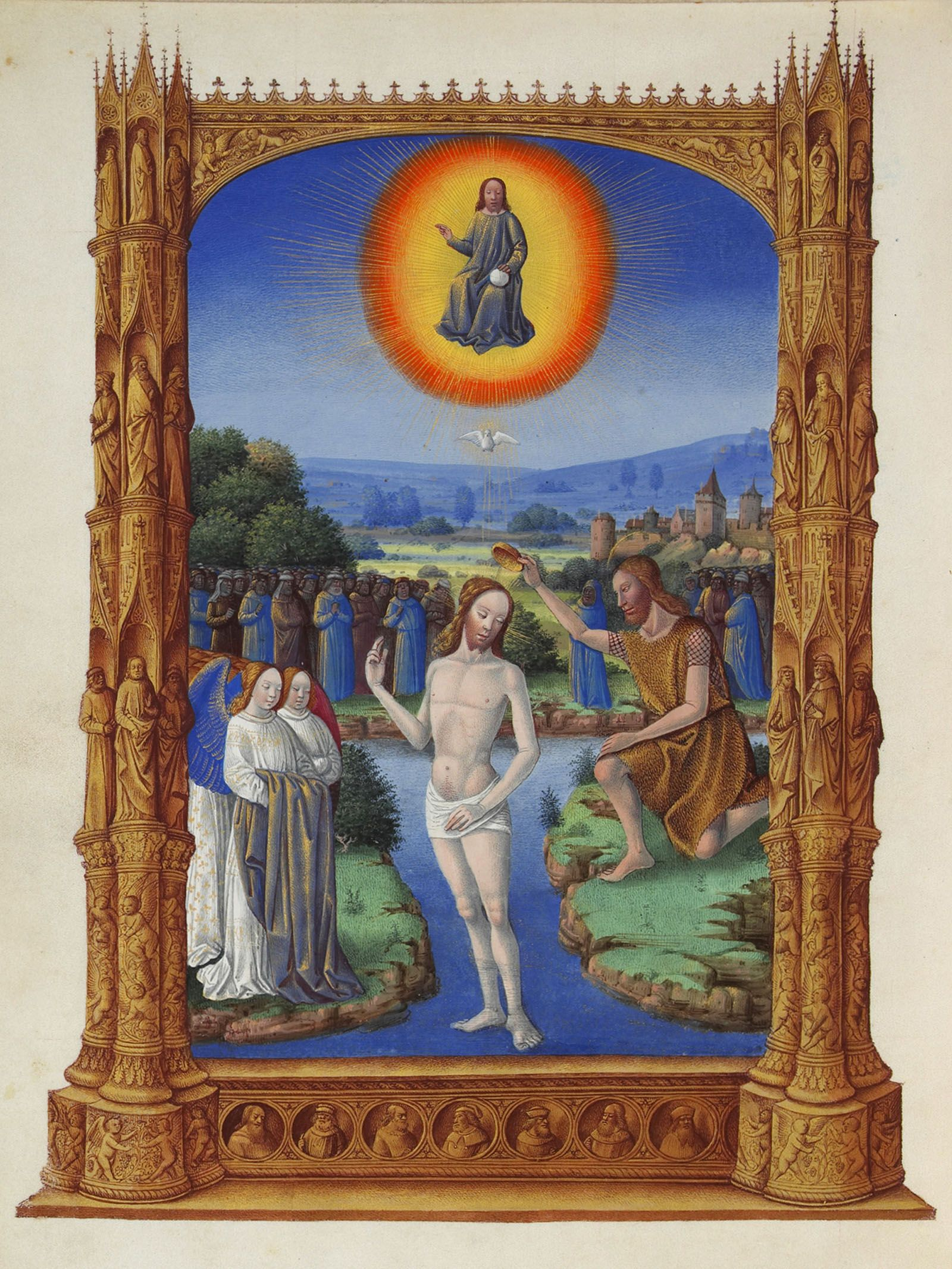
Miniature in Les Très Riches Heures du Duc de Berry depicting the Baptism of Jesus, when God the Father proclaimed that Jesus is his Son.

Son of God is a title that has been applied to a wide range of figures in the ancient and modern world, among them kings and emperors, angels, righteous individuals, the people of Israel, and, most prominently in later usage, Jesus. Its sense varies considerably between cultures and religions: in some settings it asserts literal descent from a deity, while in others it is a figurative expression of a close or covenantal relationship with God, or a formula legitimising royal authority.

Rulers in many ancient societies claimed a filial relationship with the divine. The title Son of Heaven (天子) was used by Chinese monarchs from the Western Zhou dynasty onwards under the Mandate of Heaven, and was later adopted by the Emperor of Japan and by rulers among the Eurasian nomads. In the ancient Near East, Egyptian pharaohs were described as sons of particular gods, and kings of Damascus and Sam'al took titles such as son of Hadad or son of Rakib. Greek mythology attributed divine parentage to figures such as Heracles, and Alexander the Great styled himself son of Ammon–Zeus. After the deification of Julius Caesar in 42 BC, Augustus used the title divi filius to strengthen his political position, a precedent followed by later Roman emperors; outside the empire, the Kushan king Kanishka used the equivalent devaputra.

In the Hebrew Bible, "son of God" and "sons of God" describe those standing in a special relationship with God rather than physical descent from him, including the nation of Israel, Solomon, angels, and just or pious men. Second Temple and later Jewish literature applies similar language to messianic and angelic figures, as in the Dead Sea Scrolls texts 4Q246 and 4Q174, Gabriel's Revelation, and works such as Joseph and Aseneth and the Prayer of Joseph. Rabbinic usage referred the term to Israel or to humanity generally, and not to the Jewish mashiach.

In Christianity, the title refers to the status of Jesus as the divine son of God the Father, and is found throughout the New Testament, including all four gospels, the Acts of the Apostles, and the Pauline and Johannine literature; it is distinguished from the Trinitarian term "God the Son" and is accepted in some form by nontrinitarian Christians as well. Islam recognises Jesus as a prophet and messenger and as the Messiah, but rejects any kinship between God and another being. In the Baháʼí Faith, the term is applied to Jesus symbolically, indicating the strength of his spiritual relationship with God rather than any physical relationship or a station above other Manifestations of God.

== Rulers and imperial titles ==
Throughout history, emperors and rulers ranging from the Western Zhou dynasty (c. 1000 BC) in China to Alexander the Great (c. 360 BC) to the Emperor of Japan (c. 600 AD) have assumed titles that reflect a filial relationship with deities.

The title "Son of Heaven" i.e. 天子 (from 天 meaning sky/heaven/god and 子 meaning child) was first used in the Western Zhou dynasty (c. 1000 BC). It is mentioned in the Shijing book of songs, and reflected the Zhou belief that as Son of Heaven (and as its delegate) the Emperor of China was responsible for the well-being of the whole world by the Mandate of Heaven. This title may also be translated as "son of God" given that the word Tiān in Chinese may either mean sky or god. The Emperor of Japan was also called the Son of Heaven (天子 tenshi) starting in the early 7th century.

Among the Eurasian nomads, there was also a widespread use of "Son of God/Son of Heaven" for instance, in the third century BC, the ruler was called Chanyü and similar titles were used as late as the 13th century by Genghis Khan.

Examples of kings being considered the son of god are found throughout the Ancient Near East. Egypt in particular developed a long lasting tradition. Egyptian pharaohs are known to have been referred to as the son of a particular god and their begetting in some cases is even given in sexually explicit detail. Egyptian pharaohs did not have full parity with their divine fathers but rather were subordinate. Nevertheless, in the first four dynasties, the pharaoh was considered to be the embodiment of a god. Thus, Egypt was ruled by direct theocracy, wherein "God himself is recognized as the head" of the state. During the later Amarna Period, King Amenhotep IV/Akhenaten redefined the pharaoh's godship. He taught "there was only one god and only one person who now knew the god: Akhenaten himself" and assumed position of the ḥm ntr tpy (first servant of god). He eventually eliminated all representation on his behalf by the priests of Amun as he also eliminated the god Amun, to solely lead worship identifying as the Son of the God he called Father, the latter which he recognized through the aten (sun), the vehicle through which the power of the God manifested to him. Within a few years of his first epiphany and becoming king, King Akhenaten had dropped the priestly title of ḥm ntr tpy, but remained serving as the sole cleric and son of the Father in his rule of the Two Lands. Later still, the closest Egypt came to the Jewish variant of theocracy was during the reign of Herihor. He took on the role of ruler not as a god but rather as a high-priest and king.

According to the Bible, several kings of Damascus took the title son of Hadad. From the archaeological record a stela erected by Bar-Rakib for his father Panammuwa II contains similar language. The son of Panammuwa II a king of Sam'al referred to himself as a son of Rakib. Rakib-El is a god who appears in Phoenician and Aramaic inscriptions. Panammuwa II died unexpectedly while in Damascus. However, his son the king Bar-Rakib was not a native of Damascus but rather the ruler of Sam'al it is unknown if other rules of Sam'al used similar language.

In Greek mythology, Heracles (son of Zeus) and many other figures were considered to be sons of gods through union with mortal women. From around 360 BC onwards Alexander the Great may have implied he was a demigod by using the title "Son of Ammon–Zeus".

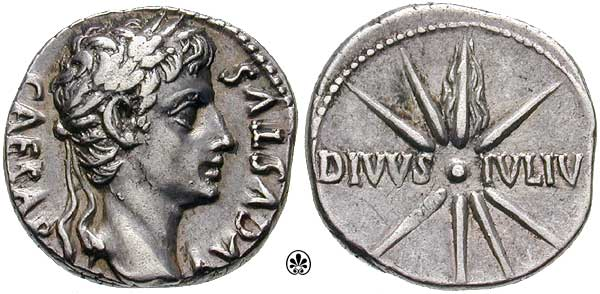
A denarius minted circa 18 BC. Obverse: CAESAR AVGVSTVS; reverse: DIVVS IVLIV(S)

In 42 BC, Julius Caesar was formally deified as "the divine Julius" (divus Iulius) after his assassination. His adopted son, Octavian (better known as Augustus, a title given to him 15 years later, in 27 BC) thus became known as divi Iuli filius (son of the divine Julius) or simply divi filius (son of the god). As a daring and unprecedented move, Augustus used this title to advance his political position in the Second Triumvirate, finally overcoming all rivals for power within the Roman state.

The word which was applied to Julius Caesar when he was deified was divus, not the distinct word deus. Thus, Augustus called himself Divi filius, not Dei filius. The line between been god and god-like was at times less than clear to the population at large, and Augustus seems to have been aware of the necessity of keeping the ambiguity. As a purely semantic mechanism, and to maintain ambiguity, the court of Augustus sustained the concept that any worship given to an emperor was paid to the "position of emperor" rather than the person of the emperor. However, the subtle semantic distinction was lost outside Rome, where Augustus began to be worshiped as a deity. The inscription DF thus came to be used for Augustus, at times unclear which meaning was intended. The assumption of the title Divi filius by Augustus meshed with a larger campaign by him to exercise the power of his image. Official portraits of Augustus made even towards the end of his life continued to portray him as a handsome youth, implying that miraculously, he never aged. Given that few people had ever seen the emperor, these images sent a distinct message.

Later, Tiberius (emperor from 14 to 37 AD) came to be accepted as the son of divus Augustus and Hadrian as the son of divus Trajan. By the end of the 1st century, the emperor Domitian was being called dominus et deus (i.e. master and god).

Outside the Roman Empire, the 2nd-century Kushan King Kanishka I used the title devaputra meaning "son of God".

== Abrahamic religions ==
The term "Son of God" is used in the Hebrew Bible as another way to refer to humans who have a special relationship with God. In Exodus, the Nation of Israel is called God's firstborn son. Solomon is also called "son of God" (2 Samuel 7:14, 1 Chronicles 28:6). Angels, just and pious men, and the Kings of Israel are called "sons of God" (Genesis 6:2-4, Job 1:6, 2:1, 38:7).

=== Baháʼí Faith ===
In the writings of the Baháʼí Faith, the term "Son of God" is applied to Jesus, but does not indicate a literal physical relationship between Jesus and God. It is symbolic and is used to indicate the very strong spiritual relationship between Jesus and God and the source of his authority. Shoghi Effendi, the head of the Baháʼí Faith in the first half of the 20th century, also noted that the term does not indicate that the station of Jesus is superior to other prophets and messengers that Baháʼís name Manifestation of God, including Buddha, Muhammad and Baha'u'llah among others. Shoghi Effendi notes that, since all Manifestations of God share the same intimate relationship with God and reflect the same light, the term Sonship can in a sense be attributable to all the Manifestations.

=== Christianity ===
In Christianity, the title "Son of God" refers to the status of Jesus as the divine son of God the Father. It derives from several uses in the New Testament and early Christian theology. The term is used in all four gospels, the Acts of the Apostles, and the Pauline and Johannine literature.

Another interpretation stems from the Judaic understanding of the title, which describes all human beings as being Sons of God. In parts of the Old Testament, historical figures like Jacob and Solomon are referred to as Sons of God, referring to their descent from Adam. Biblical scholars use this title as a way of affirming Jesus' humanity, that he is fully human, but also sent from his father who is God almighty alone as mentioned in John 3:16.

In the New Testament of the Christian Bible, "Son of God" is applied to Jesus on many occasions. On two occasions, Jesus is recognized as the Son of God by a voice which speaks from Heaven. Jesus explicitly and implicitly describes himself as the Son of God and he is also described as the Son of God by various individuals who appear in the New Testament. Jesus is called the "Son of God," and followers of Jesus are called "Christians." As applied to Jesus, the term is a reference to his role as the Messiah, or Christ, the King chosen by God. The contexts and ways in which Jesus' title, Son of God, means something more or something other than the title Messiah remain the subject of ongoing scholarly study and discussion.

The term "Son of God" should not be confused with the term "God the Son" (Greek: Θεός ὁ υἱός), the second person of the Trinity in Christian theology. The doctrine of the Trinity identifies Jesus as God the Son, identical in essence but distinct in person with regard to God the Father and God the Holy Spirit (the First and Third Persons of the Trinity). Nontrinitarian Christians accept the application to Jesus of the term "Son of God", which is found in the New Testament.

=== Islam ===
In Islam, Jesus is known as 'Īsā ibn Maryam (Arabic: عيسى بن مريم, lit. 'Jesus, son of Mary'), and is understood to be a prophet and messenger of God (Allah) and Al-Māsīh, the Arabic term for Messiah (Christ), sent to guide the tribe of Israel (banī isrā'īl in Arabic) with a new revelation, the al-Injīl (Arabic for "the gospel").

Islam rejects any kinship between God and any other being, including a son. Thus, rejecting the belief that Jesus is the begotten son of God, God himself or another god. As in Christianity, Islam believes Jesus had no earthly father. In Islam Jesus is believed to be born due to the command of God "be". God ordered the angel Jibrīl (Gabriel) to "blow" the soul of Jesus into Mary and so she gave birth to Jesus.

=== Judaism ===
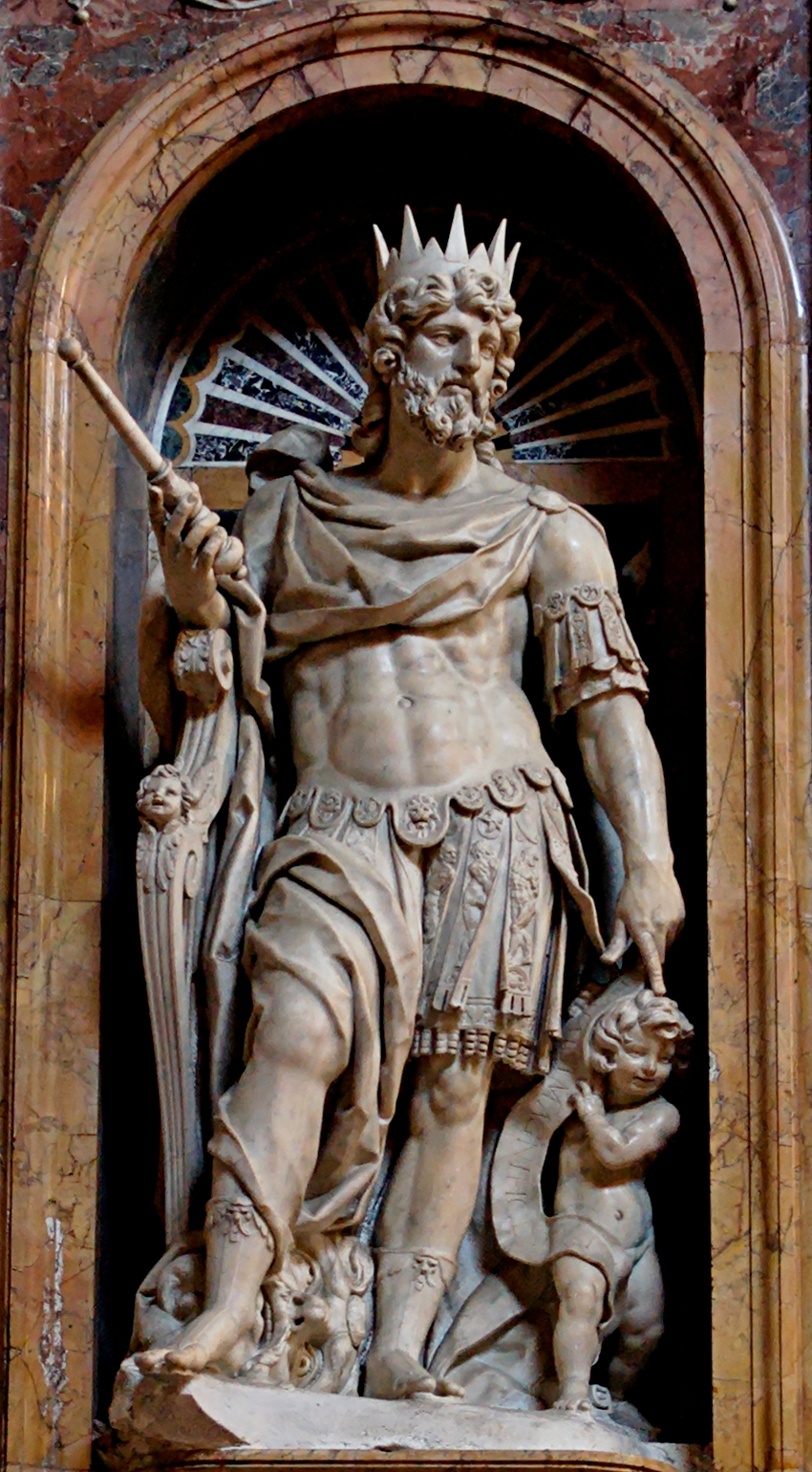
Statue of King David by Nicolas Cordier in the Borghese Chapel of the Basilica di Santa Maria Maggiore

Although references to "sons of God", "son of God" and "son of the LORD" are occasionally found in Jewish literature, they never refer to physical descent from God. There are two instances where Jewish kings are figuratively referred to as a god. These terms are often used in the general sense in which the Jewish people were referred to as "children of the LORD your God".

When it was used by the rabbis, the term referred to Israel in particular or it referred to human beings in general, it was not used as a reference to the Jewish mashiach. In Judaism the term mashiach has a broader meaning and usage and can refer to a wide range of people and objects, not necessarily related to the Jewish eschaton.

Gabriel's Revelation, also called the Vision of Gabriel or the Jeselsohn Stone, is a three-foot-tall (one metre) stone tablet with 87 lines of Hebrew text written in ink, containing a collection of short prophecies written in the first person and dated to the late 1st century BC. It is a tablet described as a "Dead Sea scroll in stone". The text seems to talk about a messianic figure from Ephraim who broke evil before righteousness by three days. Later the text talks about a "prince of princes" a leader of Israel who was killed by the evil king and not properly buried. The evil king was then miraculously defeated. The text seems to refer to Jeremiah Chapter 31. The choice of Ephraim as the lineage of the messianic figure described in the text seems to draw on passages in Jeremiah, Zechariah and Hosea. This leader was referred to as a son of God. The text seems to be based on a Jewish revolt recorded by Josephus dating from 4 BC. Based on its dating the text seems to refer to Simon of Peraea, one of the three leaders of this revolt.

In some versions of Deuteronomy the Dead Sea Scrolls refer to the sons of God rather than the sons of Israel, probably in reference to angels. The Septuagint reads similarly. 4Q174 is a midrashic text in which God refers to the Davidic messiah as his son. 4Q246 refers to a figure who will be called the son of God and son of the Most High. It is debated if this figure represents the royal messiah, a future evil gentile king or something else. In 11Q13 Melchizedek is referred to as god the divine judge. Melchizedek in the bible was the king of Salem. At least some in the Qumran community seemed to think that at the end of days Melchizedek would reign as their king. The passage is based on Psalm 82.

In Joseph and Aseneth and the related text The Story of Asenath, Joseph is referred to as the son of God. In the Prayer of Joseph both Jacob and the angel are referred to as angels and the sons of God.

== See also ==
- Emperor of Japan
- Jesus, King of the Jews
- Names and titles of Jesus in the New Testament
- Uzair

== Bibliography ==
- Borgen, Peder. Early Christianity and Hellenistic Judaism. Edinburgh: T & T Clark Publishing. 1996.
- Brown, Raymond. An Introduction to the New Testament. New York: Doubleday. 1997.
- Essays in Greco-Roman and Related Talmudic Literature. ed. by Henry A. Fischel. New York: KTAV Publishing House. 1977.
- Dunn, J. D. G., Christology in the Making, London: SCM Press. 1989.
- Ferguson, Everett. Backgrounds in Early Christianity. Grand Rapids: Eerdmans Publishing. 1993.
- Greene, Colin J. D. Christology in Cultural Perspective: Marking Out the Horizons. Grand Rapids: InterVarsity Press. Eerdmans Publishing. 2003.
- Holt, Bradley P. Thirsty for God: A Brief History of Christian Spirituality. Minneapolis: Fortress Press. 2005.
- Josephus, Flavius. Complete Works. trans. and ed. by William Whiston. Grand Rapids: Kregel Publishing. 1960.
- Letham, Robert. The Work of Christ. Downers Grove: InterVarsity Press. 1993.
- Macleod, Donald. The Person of Christ. Downers Grove: InterVarsity Press. 1998.
- McGrath, Alister. Historical Theology: An Introduction to the History of Christian Thought. Oxford: Blackwell Publishing. 1998.
- Neusner, Jacob. From Politics to Piety: The Emergence of Pharisaic Judaism. Providence, R. I.: Brown University. 1973.
- Norris, Richard A. Jr. The Christological Controversy. Philadelphia: Fortress Press. 1980.
- O'Collins, Gerald. Christology: A Biblical, Historical, and Systematic Study of Jesus. Oxford:Oxford University Press. 2009.
- Pelikan, Jaroslav. Development of Christian Doctrine: Some Historical Prolegomena. London: Yale University Press. 1969.
- —— The Emergence of the Catholic Tradition (100–600). Chicago: University of Chicago Press. 1971.
- Schweitzer, Albert. Quest of the Historical Jesus: A Critical Study of the Progress from Reimarus to Wrede. trans. by W. Montgomery. London: A & C Black. 1931.
- Tyson, John R. Invitation to Christian Spirituality: An Ecumenical Anthology. New York: Oxford University Press. 1999.
- Wilson, R. Mcl. Gnosis and the New Testament. Philadelphia: Fortress Press. 1968.
- Witherington, Ben III. The Jesus Quest: The Third Search for the Jew of Nazareth. Downers Grove: InterVarsity Press. 1995.
- —— "The Gospel of John." in The Dictionary of Jesus and the Gospels. ed. by Joel Greene, Scot McKnight and I. Howard
