= Augustus (title) =

Ancient Roman title

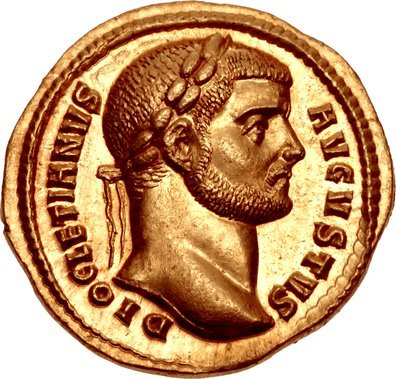
Coin of the emperor Diocletian, marked diocletianus augustus

Augustus (plural Augusti; /ɔːˈɡʌstəs/ aw-GUST-əs, Classical Latin: [au̯ˈɡʊstʊs]; "majestic", "great", or "venerable") was the main title of the Roman emperors during antiquity. It was given as both a name and a title to Gaius Julius Caesar Octavianus (often referred to simply as Augustus) in 27 BC, marking his accession as Rome's first emperor. On his death, it became an official title of his successor, and was so used by all emperors thereafter.

The feminine form Augusta was used for Roman empresses and other female members of the imperial family. The masculine and feminine forms originated in the time of the Roman Republic, in connection with things considered divine or sacred in traditional Roman religion. Their use as titles for major and minor Roman deities of the Empire associated the imperial system and family with traditional Roman virtues and the divine will and may be considered a feature of the Roman imperial cult.

In Rome's Greek-speaking provinces, "Augustus" was translated as Sebastos (Σεβαστός), or Hellenised as Augoustos (Αὔγουστος); these titles continued to be used in the Byzantine Empire until the Fall of Constantinople in 1453, although they gradually lost their imperial exclusivity in favour of Basileus and Autokrator.

After the fall of the Western Roman Empire, the title "Augustus" would later be incorporated into the style of the Holy Roman Emperor, a precedent set by Charlemagne who used the title serenissimus Augustus. As such, Augustus was sometimes also used as a name for men of aristocratic birth, especially in the lands of the Holy Roman Empire. It remains a given name for males.

== Title in ancient Rome ==
=== Earliest usage ===
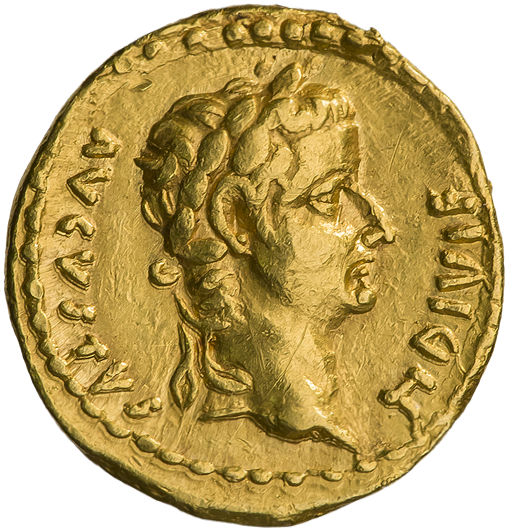
A gold coin of Tiberius (r. 14–37) marked ti divi f — augustus

Some thirty years before its first association with Caesar's heir, augustus was an obscure honorific with religious associations. One early context (58 BC) associates it with provincial Lares (Roman household gods). In Latin poetry and prose, it signifies the further elevation or augmentation of what is already sacred or religious. Some Roman sources connected it to augury, and Rome was said to have been founded with the "august augury" of Romulus.

=== Imperial honorific ===
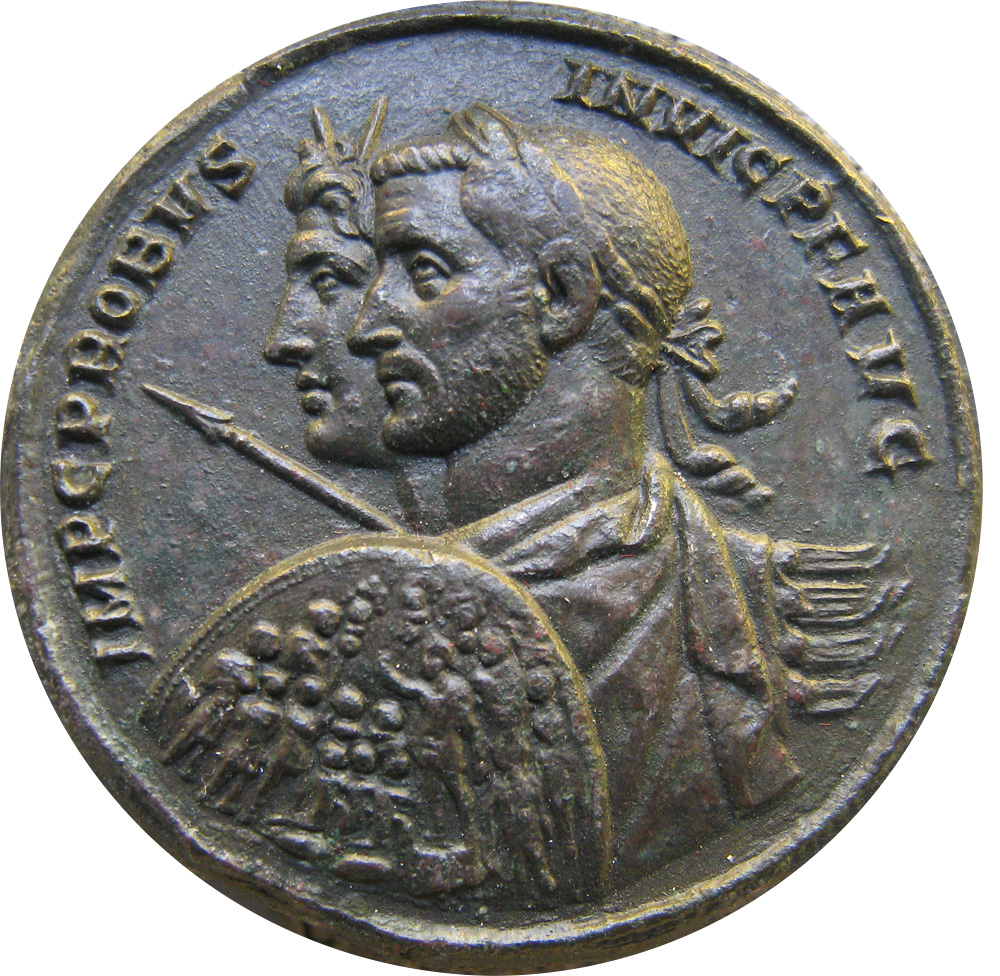
A bronze medallion of emperor Probus (r. 276–282), marked imp·c·probus·invic·p·f· aug

The first true Roman known as "Augustus" (and first counted as a Roman emperor) was Octavian. He was the grand-nephew and later posthumously adopted as the son and heir of Julius Caesar, who had been murdered for his seeming aspiration to divine monarchy, then subsequently and officially deified. Octavian studiously avoided any association with Caesar's claims, other than acknowledging his position and duties as Divi filius ("son of the deified one"). Nevertheless, his position was unique and extraordinary. He had ended Rome's prolonged and bloody civil war with his victory at Actium, and established a lasting peace. He was self-evidently favoured by the gods. As princeps senatus ("first man or head of the senate") he presided at senatorial meetings. He was pontifex maximus, chief priest of Roman state religion. He held consular imperium, with authority equal to the official chief executive. He was supreme commander of all Roman legions, and held tribunicia potestas ("tribunician power"). As a tribune, his person was inviolable (sacrosanctitas) and he had the right to veto any act or proposal by any magistrate within Rome.

He was officially renamed Augustus by the Roman Senate on 16 January 27 BC – or perhaps the Senate ratified his own careful choice; "Romulus" had been considered, and rejected. This name was deemed too blatant as it would make Octavius the second founder of Rome. So his official renaming in a form vaguely associated with a traditionally Republican religiosity, but unprecedented as a cognomen, may have served to show that he owed his position to the approval of Rome and its gods, and possibly his own unique, elevated, "godlike" nature and talents. His full and official title thus became Imperator Caesar Divi Filius Augustus.

Augustus' religious reforms extended or affirmed Augusti as a near ubiquitous title or honour for various minor local deities, including the Lares Augusti of local communities, and obscure provincial deities such as the North African Marazgu Augustus. This extension of an Imperial honorific to major and minor deities of Rome and her provinces is considered a ground-level feature of Imperial cult, which continued until the official replacement of Rome's traditional religions by Christianity. The religious ambiguity of the title allowed for this kind of deification throughout the empire as subjects – beginning from Asia and Bithynia – adopted the worship of the genius or soul of Augustus, establishing a ruler-cult.

The first emperor bequeathed the title Augustus to his adopted heir and successor Tiberius in his will. From then on, though it conferred no specific legal powers, Augustus was a titular element of the imperial name. Subsequently, the title was bestowed by the Roman Senate.

There was no explicit outline in Roman law for the succession of Roman emperors or who could become princeps, which became clear with the fall of the Julio-Claudian dynasty in 69 AD. Afterwards, emperor Vespasian established the legal basis for his succession by listing offices and powers that he had inherited from Augustus, Tiberius, and Claudius in the lex quae dicitur de imperio Vespasiani. Vespasian adopted the name Imperator Caesar Vespasianus Augustus, with Augustus used as a cognomen to help legitimize his reign and the Flavian dynastic assumption of Julio-Claudian patrimony. Until the reign of Marcus Aurelius (r. 161–180), the title Augustus was unique to its bearer; in 161 Marcus Aurelius elevated Lucius Verus (r. 161–169) to Augustus and both bore the title at the same time.

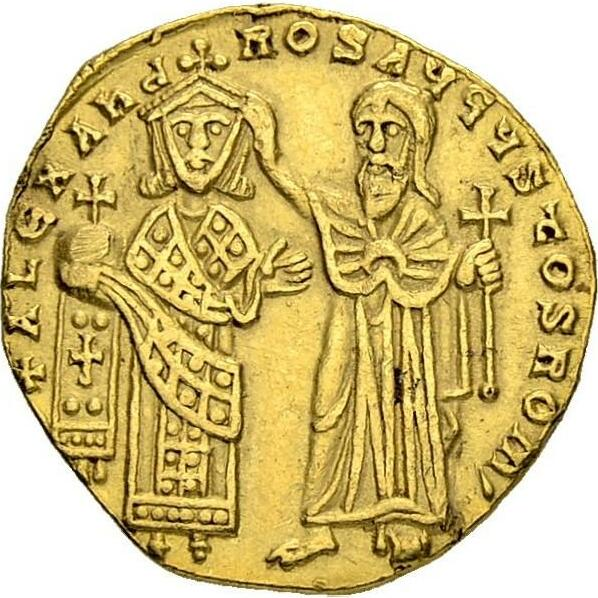
Coin of emperor Alexander II with the title augustos rom, 913.

The date of an emperor's investiture with the title Augustus was celebrated as the dies imperii and commemorated annually. From the 3rd century, new emperors were often acclaimed as Augusti by the army. Emperors also inherited Caesar (originally a family name) as part of their titles. The Tetrarchy instituted by Diocletian shared power between two Augusti and two Caesares. Nevertheless, as Augustus senior, Diocletian retained legislative power. Diocletian and his eventual successor after the civil wars of the Tetrarchy, Constantine the Great, both used the title semper Augustus ('ever Augustus'), which indicates a formalisation of the name in the late 3rd and early 4th centuries. From the reign of Constantine onwards, the Ancient Greek: Σεβαστός, romanized: Sebastós was abandoned as the translation of "Augustus" in favour of the homophone Ancient Greek: Αὔγουστος, romanized: aúgoustos.

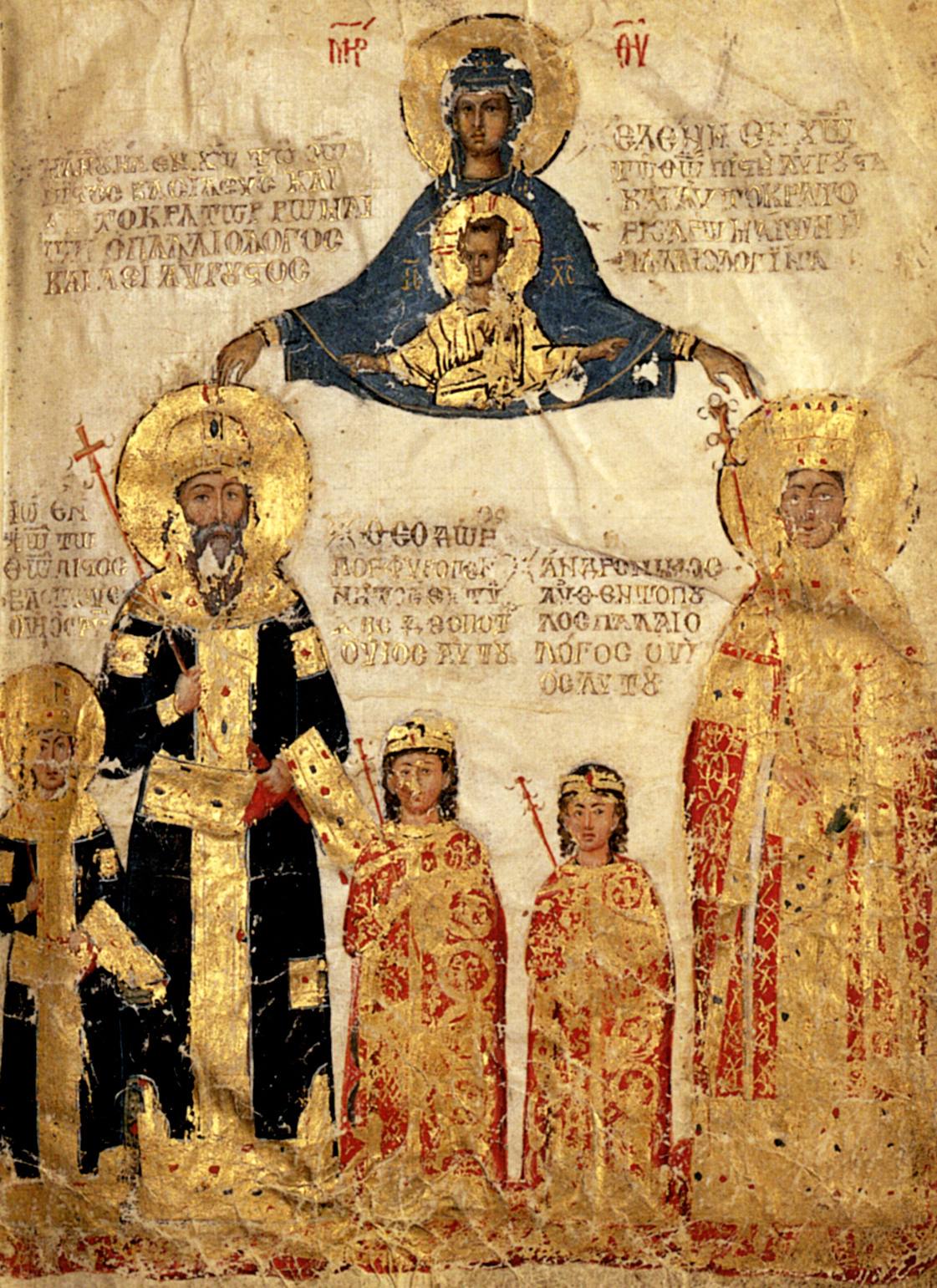
Emperor Manuel II Palaiologos in a Byzantine miniature from c. 1404. The Greek text call hims "basileus and autokrator of the Romans, Palaiologos, always Augustus" (ΒΑϹΙΛΕΥϹ ΚΑΙ ΑΥΤΟΚΡΑΤΩΡ ΡΩΜΑΙΩΝ Ο ΠΑΛΑΙΟΛΟΓΟϹ ΚΑΙ ΑΕΙ ΑΥΓΟΥϹΤΟϹ), after the late antique formula "semper Augustus".

Beginning with Valentinian the Great and his brother Valens, whom he raised to Augustus pari iure, 'Augustus without reserve' in 364, the concurrent Augusti of the eastern and western provinces were of equal standing. The last emperor proclaimed in the West, Romulus (r. 475–476), adopted Augustus not only as a title, but also as a proper name (becoming Romulus Augustus pius felix Augustus).

After the victory over the Sasanian Empire in the Byzantine–Sasanian War of 602–628, the 7th century final phase of the Roman–Persian Wars, the emperor Heraclius introduced the Ancient Greek: βασιλεύς, romanized: basileús, lit. 'monarch' and the title Augoustos lost importance. Until Heraclius's 629 reforms, royal titles had been eschewed in Rome since the legendary overthrow of the Roman monarchy's last king Tarquinius Superbus by Lucius Junius Brutus in the late 6th century BC.

The Imperial titles of imperator, caesar, and augustus were respectively rendered in Greek as autokratōr, kaisar, and augoustos (or sebastos). The Greek titles were used in the Byzantine Empire until its extinction in 1453, although sebastos lost its imperial exclusivity and autokratōr along with basileus became the exclusive title of the emperor after the 8th century.

=== Feminine equivalent ===
Augusta was the female equivalent of Augustus, and had similar origins as an obscure descriptor with vaguely religious overtones. It was bestowed on some women of the Imperial dynasties, as an indicator of worldly power and influence and a status near to divinity. There was no qualification with higher prestige. The title or honorific was shared by state goddesses associated with the Imperial regime's generosity and provision, such as Ceres, Bona Dea, Juno, Minerva, and Ops, and by local or minor goddesses around the empire. Other personifications perceived as essentially female and given the title Augusta include Pax (peace) and Victoria (victory).

The first woman to receive the honorific Augusta was Livia Drusilla, by the last will of her husband Augustus. From his death (14 AD) she was known as Julia Augusta, until her own death in AD 29.

== Other uses ==
=== Holy Roman Empire ===
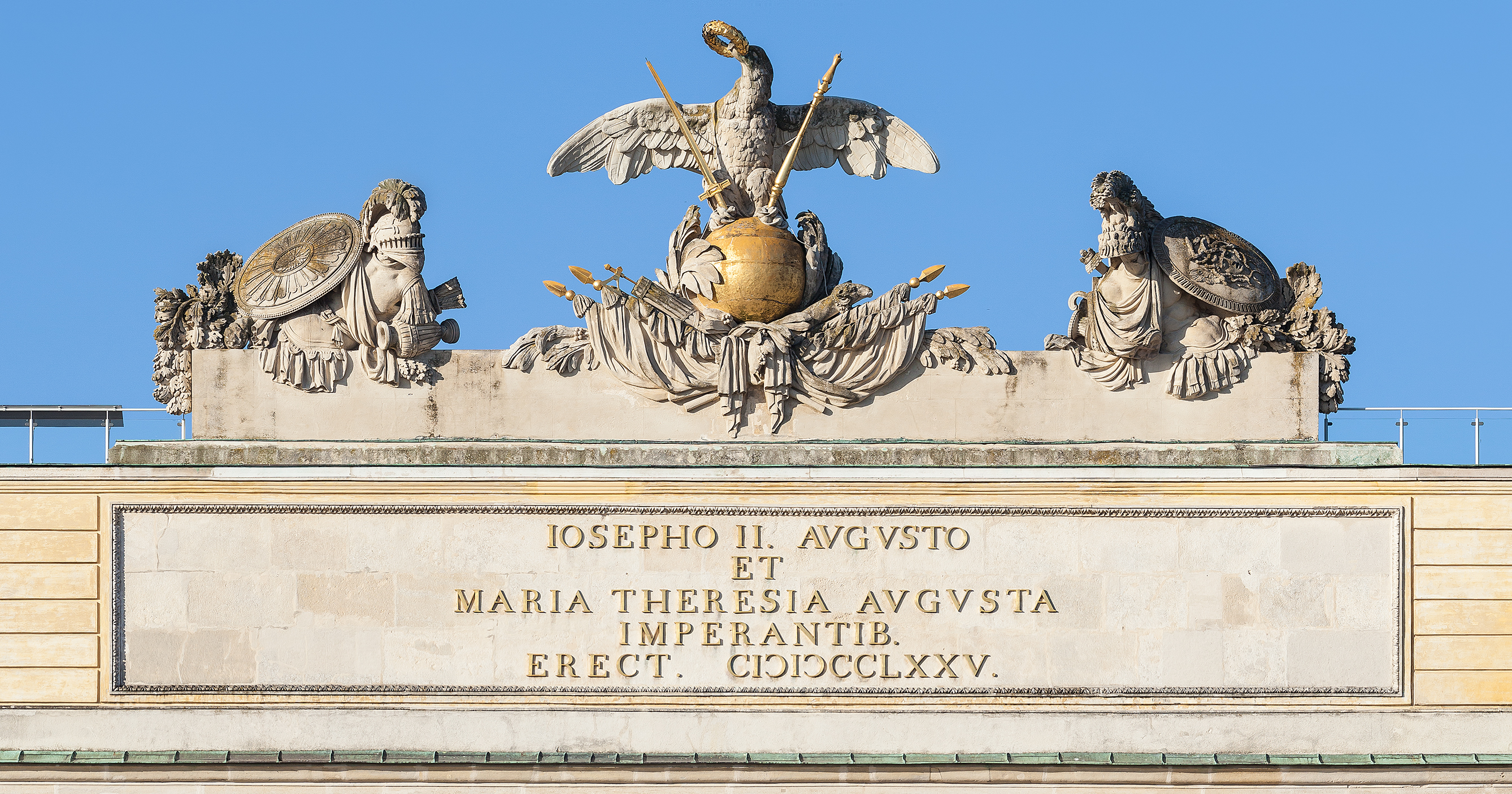
Inscription on the Gloriette in Vienna "IOSEPHO II. AVGVSTO ET MARIA THERESIA AVGVSTA" (Joseph II, Holy Roman Emperor and Empress Maria Theresa)

Charlemagne used the title serenissimus Augustus as a prefix to his titles. The style assumed by Otto I was imperator Augustus. The relative simplicity of the style and absence of any mention of Rome was in deference to Byzantium (although he would briefly use the title imperator Augustus Romanorum ac Francorum (Emperor-Augustus of the Romans and Franks) in 966), which would soon reach the medieval apex of its power. By the 12th century, the standard style of the Emperor had become Dei gratia Romanorum imperator semper Augustus (By the grace of God, Emperor of the Romans, ever Augustus) and would remain so until at least the 16th century.

The formula of semper Augustus ("ever exalted") when translated into German in the late period of the Holy Roman Empire was not rendered literally, but as allen Zeiten Merer des Reichs or allzeit Mehrer des Reiches ("ever Increaser of the Reich"), from the transitive verbal meaning of augere "to augment, increase".

=== Brian Boru ===
The Irish High King Brian Boru (c. 941 – 1014) was described in the Annals of Ulster as ardrí Gaidhel Erenn & Gall & Bretan, August iartair tuaiscirt Eorpa uile (lit. 'High King of the Gaels of Ireland, the Norsemen and the Britons, Augustus of the whole of north-west Europe'), the only Irish king to receive that distinction.

== See also ==
- Archons
- Auctoritas
- Basileus
- List of Augustae
