= Shem and Eber Cave =

Holy site in Safed, Israel

Coordinates: 32°59′N 35°33′E

The Shem and Eber cave (מערת שם ועבר) is a cave in the Old City of Safed, which has historically been a holy site for the Abrahamic religions.

== History ==
The cave was used as a burial cave by a prominent Jewish family beginning in the 4th century CE. During the Crusader period it was run by a group of nuns known as the Daughters of Jacob, apparently due to a tradition that Jacob's family was based here after its return from Harran. Under the Mamluk Sultanate the site was used for Muslim worship. Chaim Vital referred to the site as Awlad Yaakob (Sons of Jacob), and testified that it was the burial place of Dosa ben Harkinas. The tradition of association with Shem and Eber only dates to recent generations; previously it was regarded by Muslims as the burial place of Shem.

== Shem and Eber ==
Currently, the cave is primarily known as the reputed site of the beit midrash of Shem and Eber. According to Jewish tradition, these two Biblical figures established a study hall for monotheistic religion. Traditionally, later Biblical figures such as Rebecca and Jacob visited the beit midrash to seek prophetic guidance, while Esau expected the court in this beit midrash to judge him if he were to commit murder. Jacob was said to have studied there for 14 years between leaving his parents and arriving in Harran. The identification of the ancient beit midrash (whose location is nowhere specified in the sources) with this particular cave may follow from the Muslim belief that Shem was buried here, or from the assumption that as the "revealed Torah" had not been revealed yet, the material studied must have been "hidden Torah", for which Safed would naturally seem an ideal location.
