= Abel-mizraim =

Place mentioned in the Hebrew Bible

Abel-mizraim (Hebrew: אבל מצרים, ’Āḇêl-Mitsrayim,; the "meadow of Egypt", or "mourning of Egypt") is a place "beyond," or east, of the Jordan River, at the "threshing-floor of Atad(גֹּרֶן הָאָטָד)." Here Joseph and his 11 brothers (representing the future 12 tribes of Israel) and the Egyptians mourned seven days for Jacob (Genesis 50:4–11). Its exact site is unknown.

The name Abel-mizraim is only mentioned once in the Hebrew Bible.

== Notes ==
Attribution
