= Jacob =

Biblical patriarch, son of Isaac

- יַעֲקֹב
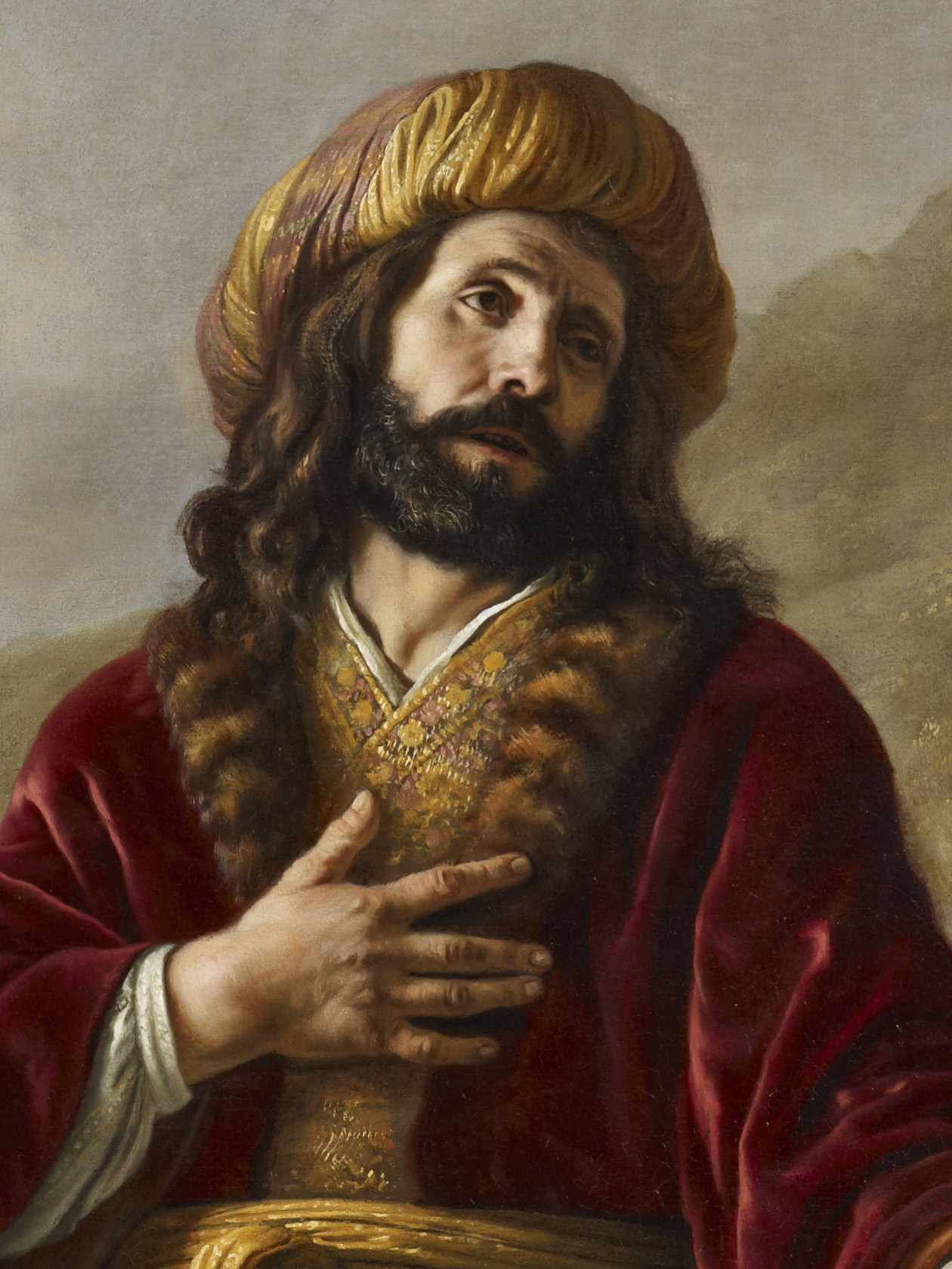
- Detail from Jacob Seeking the Forgiveness of Esau (1652) by Jan Victors
- Resting place: Cave of Machpelah, Hebron, Canaan (traditional); 31.5247°N 35.1107°E
- Other name: Israel (יִשְׂרָאֵל)
- Known for: Being the third Hebrew patriarch and the forefather of the Israelites
- Spouse(s): Leah; Rachel
- Partner(s): Bilhah; Zilpah
- Children: Oldest to youngest, per woman: With Leah; Reuben; Simeon; Levi; Judah; Issachar; Zebulun; Dinah (daughter); With Rachel; Joseph; Benjamin; With Bilhah; Dan; Naphtali; With Zilpah; Gad; Asher
- Parents: Isaac (father); Rebecca (mother)
- Relatives: Esau (fraternal twin brother); Laban (maternal uncle, father-in-law)

Jacob, (Note: /ˈdʒeɪkəb/; Hebrew: יַעֲקֹב, Modern: Yaʿaqōv, Tiberian: Yaʿăqōḇ; Arabic: يَعْقُوب, romanized: Yaʿqūb; Greek: Ἰακώβ, romanized: Iakṓb) later given the name Israel, (Note: /ˈɪzri.əl, -reɪ-/; Hebrew: יִשְׂרָאֵל, romanized: Yīsrāʾēl, [jisʁaˈʔel]) is the third Hebrew patriarch in Judaism and an important figure in the Abrahamic religions. He first appears in the Torah, where he is described in the Book of Genesis as a son of Isaac and Rebecca. Accordingly, alongside his older fraternal twin brother Esau, Jacob's paternal grandparents are Abraham and Sarah and his maternal grandfather is Bethuel, whose wife is not mentioned. He is said to have bought Esau's birthright and, with his mother's help, deceived his aging father to bless him instead of Esau. Then, following a severe drought in his homeland Canaan, Jacob and his descendants migrated to neighbouring Egypt through the efforts of his son Joseph, who had become a confidant of the pharaoh. After dying in Egypt at the age of 147, he is supposed to have been buried in the Cave of Machpelah in Hebron.

In the narrative of the Hebrew Bible, Jacob's progeny were begotten by four women: his wives (and maternal cousins) Leah and Rachel; and his concubines Bilhah and Zilpah. His sons were, in order of their birth: Reuben, Simeon, Levi, Judah, Dan, Naphtali, Gad, Asher, Issachar, Zebulun, Joseph, and Benjamin. He also had a daughter named Dinah, born to his first wife Leah. The descendants of Jacob's sons were collectively known as the Israelites, with each son being the forefather of one of the Twelve Tribes of Israel, of whom all but the Tribe of Levi were allotted territory in the Land of Israel. The Genesis narrative also states that Jacob displayed favoritism among his wives and children, preferring Rachel and her sons Joseph and Benjamin to the rest—culminating in Joseph's older brothers selling him into slavery out of resentment.

Mainstream archaeologists unanimously agree that there is no existing or recoverable evidence or context that could establish Jacob as a "historical figure."

== Etymology ==
=== Hebrew ===
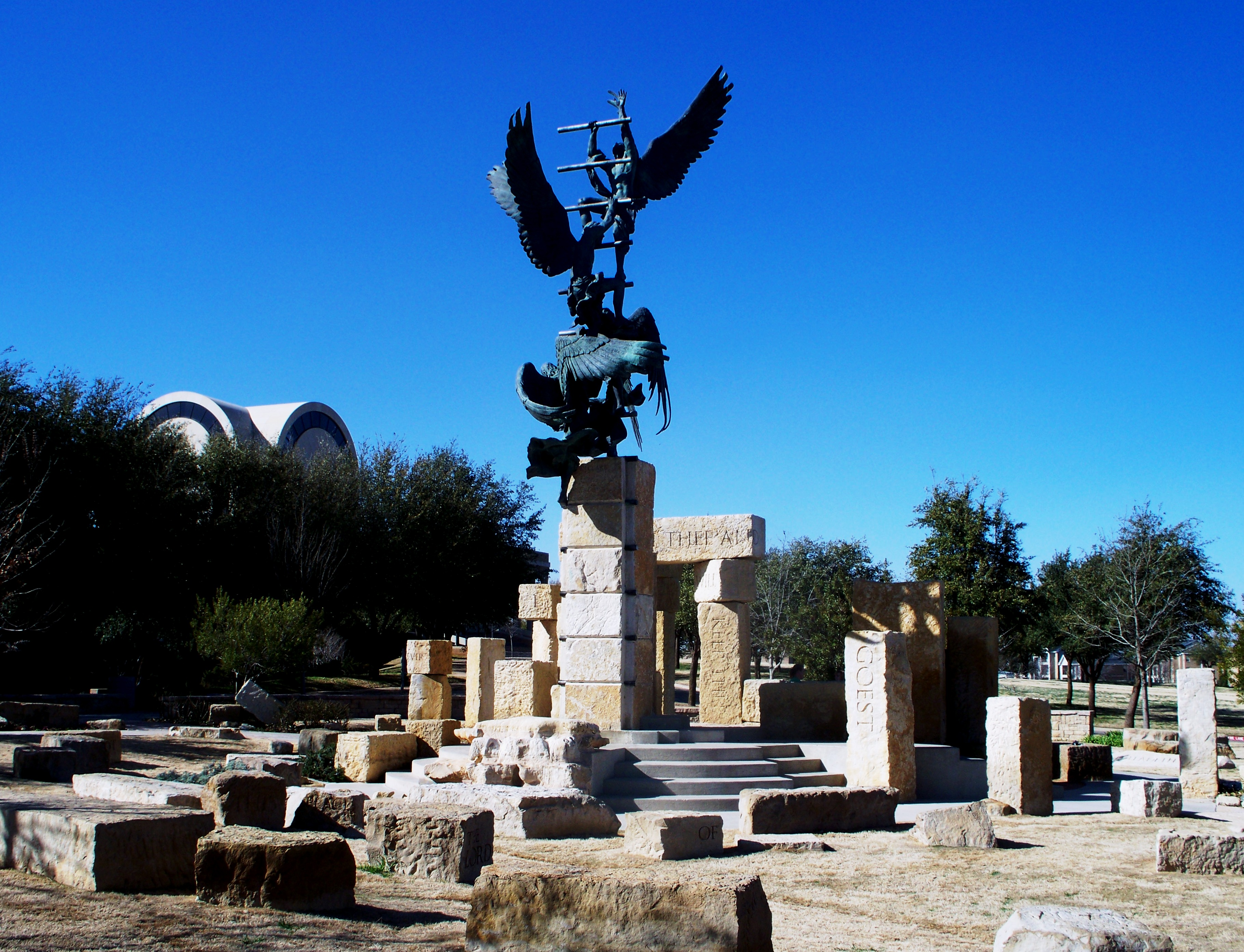
Jacob's Dream statue and display on the campus of Abilene Christian University

According to the folk etymology found in Genesis 25:26, the name Yaʿaqōv יעקב is derived from ʿaqev עָקֵב "heel", as Jacob was born grasping the heel of his twin brother Esau. The historical origin of the name is uncertain, although similar names have been recorded. Yaqub-Har is recorded as a place name in a list by Thutmose III (15th century BC), and later as the nomen of a Hyksos pharaoh. The hieroglyphs are ambiguous, and can be read as "Yaqub-Har", "Yaqubaal", or "Yaqub El". The same name is recorded earlier still, in c. 1800 BC, in cuneiform inscriptions (spelled ya-ah-qu-ub-el, ya-qu-ub-el). The suggestion that the personal name may be shortened from this compound name, which would translate to "may El protect", originates with Bright (1960). In the Amorite language, parallel forms of Jacob's name are attested as ia-aḫ-qú-ub-DINGIR and ia-aḫ-qú-bu-um.

The scientific etymology of the name Israel is unclear, but a "good guess" is "[The God] El rules". In Judaism, the etymology of the name, given to Jacob following the episode of his wrestling with the angel (Genesis 32:22–32), is understood to be connected to the Hebrew words שָׂרִיתָ (saritha, striven) and אֱלֹהִים (Elohim, God). Christian commentator James Strong gives the etymology as a composition of אֵל el "god" and the root שָׂרָה śarah "to rule, contend, have power, prevail over". The word "strive" is often used for the proposed etymon שרה, but as Genesis novelly uses the word without defining it, this interpretation is merely based upon the context in the story. Various traditional translations of Yisra'el include "one that struggled with the divine angel" (Josephus), "one who has prevailed with God" (Rashi), "a man seeing God" (Whiston), "he will rule as God" (Strong) (Note: from Hebrew: שרה, "prevail", "have power as a prince").), or "a prince with God" (Morris).

=== Greek ===
The Septuagint renders the name Iákobos (Ancient Greek: Ἰάκωβος), whence Latin Jacobus, English Jacob.

== Genesis narrative ==
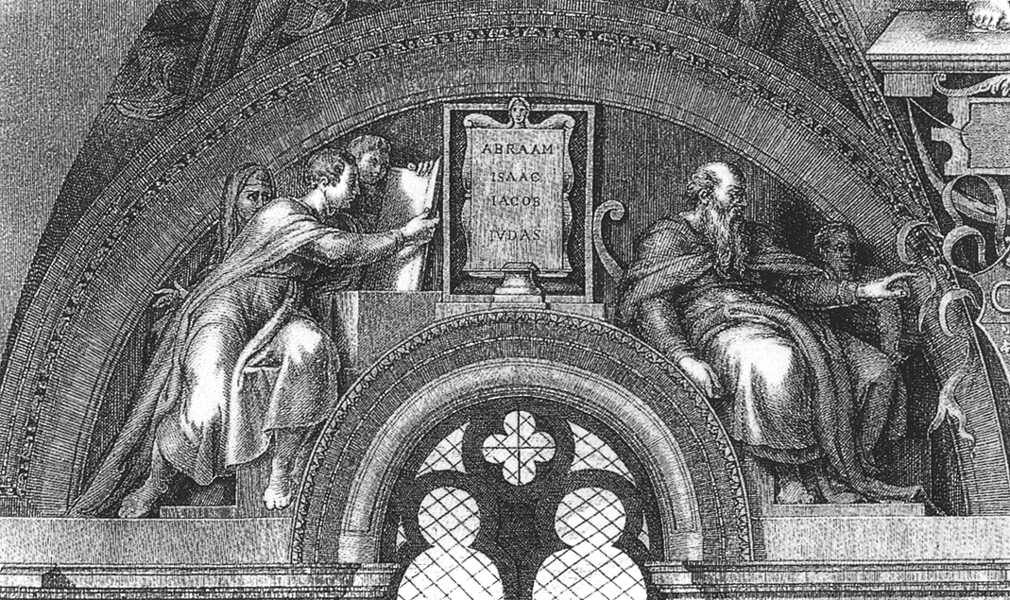
Abraham, Isaac, Jacob and Judah by Michelangelo Buonarroti, Sistine Chapel, Vatican City

The biblical account of the life of Jacob is found in the Book of Genesis, chapters 25–50.

=== Birth ===
Jacob and his twin brother, Esau, were born to Isaac and Rebecca after 20 years of marriage, when Isaac was 60 years of age. Rebecca was uncomfortable during her pregnancy: the twins struggled with each other in her womb, and she went to inquire of God why she was suffering. She received the prophecy that the two nations to whom she would give birth would be divided: "the one people shall be stronger than the other people; and the elder shall serve the younger".

When the time came for Rebecca to give birth, the firstborn, Esau, came out covered with red hair, as if he were wearing a hairy garment, and his heel was grasped by the hand of Jacob, the secondborn. According to Genesis 25, Isaac and Rebecca named the first son Esau (Hebrew: עשו). The second son they named Jacob (Hebrew: יעקב, Ya'aqob or Ya'aqov, meaning "heel-catcher", "supplanter", "leg-puller", "he who follows upon the heels of one", from Hebrew: עקב, 'aqab or 'aqav, "seize by the heel", "circumvent", "restrain", a wordplay upon Hebrew: עקבה, 'iqqebah or 'iqqbah, "heel").

The boys displayed very different natures as they matured: "... and Esau was a cunning hunter, a man of the field; but Jacob was a simple man, dwelling in tents". Moreover, the attitudes of their parents toward them also differed: "And Isaac loved Esau, because he did eat of his venison: but Rebecca loved Jacob."

=== Acquiring Esau's birthright ===
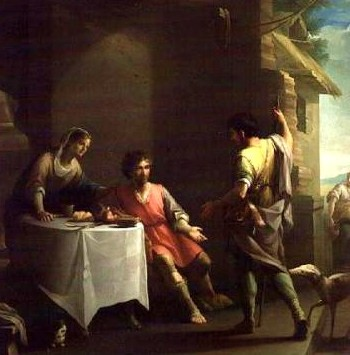
Jacob offering a bowl of stew to Esau for his birthright, 18th-century painting by Zacarias Gonzalez Velazquez

Genesis 25:29–34 tells the account of Esau selling his birthright to Jacob. This passage tells that Esau, returning famished from the fields, begged Jacob to give him some of the stew that Jacob had just made. Esau referred to the dish as "that same red pottage", giving rise to his nickname, Hebrew: אדום, Edom, meaning "Red". Jacob offered to give Esau a bowl of stew in exchange for his birthright, to which Esau agreed.

=== Blessing of Isaac ===
As Isaac aged, he became blind and was uncertain when he would die, so he decided to bestow Esau's birthright upon him. He requested that Esau go out to the fields with his weapons (quiver and bow) to kill some venison. Isaac then requested that Esau make "savory meat" for him out of the venison, according to the way he enjoyed it the most, so that he could eat it and bless Esau.

Rebecca overheard this conversation. It is suggested that she realized prophetically that Isaac's blessings would go to Jacob, since she was told before the twins' birth that the older son would serve the younger. Rebecca blessed Jacob and she quickly ordered Jacob to bring her two kid goats from their flock so that he could take Esau's place in serving Isaac and receiving his blessing. Jacob protested that his father would recognize their deception since Esau was hairy and he himself was smooth-skinned. He feared his father would curse him as soon as he felt him, but Rebecca offered to take the curse herself, then insisted that Jacob obey her. Jacob did as his mother instructed and, when he returned with the kids, Rebecca made the savory meat that Isaac loved. Before she sent Jacob to his father, she dressed him in Esau's garments and laid goatskins on his arms and neck to simulate hairy skin.

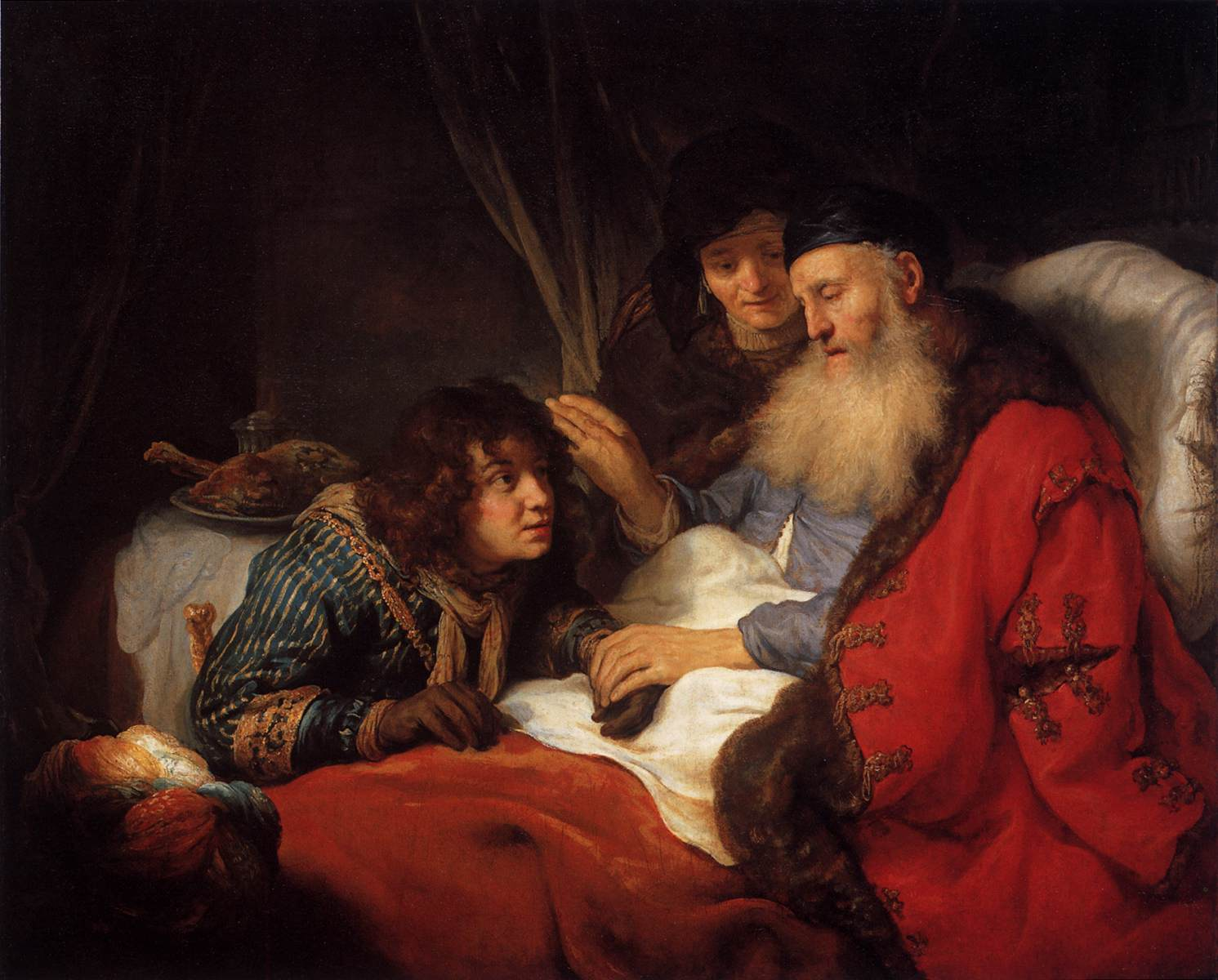
An elderly Isaac blessing Jacob, oil on canvas by Govert Flinck, 1638

Disguised as Esau, Jacob entered Isaac's room. Surprised that Esau was back so soon, Isaac asked how it could be that the hunt went so quickly. Jacob responded, "Because the LORD your God brought it to me." Rashi says Isaac's suspicions were aroused even more, because Esau never used the personal name of God. Isaac demanded that Jacob come close so he could feel him, but the goatskins felt just like Esau's hairy skin. Confused, Isaac exclaimed, "The voice is Jacob's voice, but the hands are the hands of Esau!" Still trying to get at the truth, Isaac asked him directly, "Art thou my very son Esau?" and Jacob answered simply, "I am." Isaac proceeded to eat the food and to drink the wine that Jacob gave him, and then told him to come close and kiss him. As Jacob kissed his father, Isaac smelled the clothes which belonged to Esau and finally accepted that the person in front of him was Esau. Isaac then blessed Jacob with the blessing that was meant for Esau. Genesis 27:28–29 states Isaac's blessing: "Therefore God give thee of the dew of heavens, and the fatness of the earth, and plenty of corn and wine: Let people serve thee: be lord over thy brethren, and let thy mother's sons bow down to thee: cursed be every one that curseth thee, and blessed be he that blesseth thee."

Jacob had scarcely left the room when Esau returned from the hunt to prepare his game and receive the blessing. The realization that he had been deceived shocked Isaac, yet he acknowledged that Jacob had received the blessings by adding, "Indeed, he will be [or remain] blessed!" (27:33).

Esau was heartbroken by the deception and begged for his own blessing. Having made Jacob a ruler over his brothers, Isaac could only promise, "By your sword you shall live, but your brother you shall serve; yet it shall be that when you are aggrieved, you may cast off his yoke from upon your neck" (27:39–40).

Although Esau sold Jacob his own birthright, which was his blessing, for "red pottage", Esau still hated Jacob for receiving his blessing that their father Isaac unknowingly had given to him. He vowed to kill Jacob as soon as Isaac died. When Rebecca heard about his murderous intentions, she ordered Jacob to travel to her brother Laban's house in Haran, until Esau's anger subsided. She convinced Isaac to send Jacob away by telling him that she despaired of his marrying a local girl from the idol-worshipping families of Canaan (as Esau had done). After Isaac sent Jacob away to find a wife, Esau realized his own Canaanite wives were evil in his father's eyes and so he took a daughter of Isaac's half-brother, Ishmael, as another wife.

=== Jacob's Ladder ===
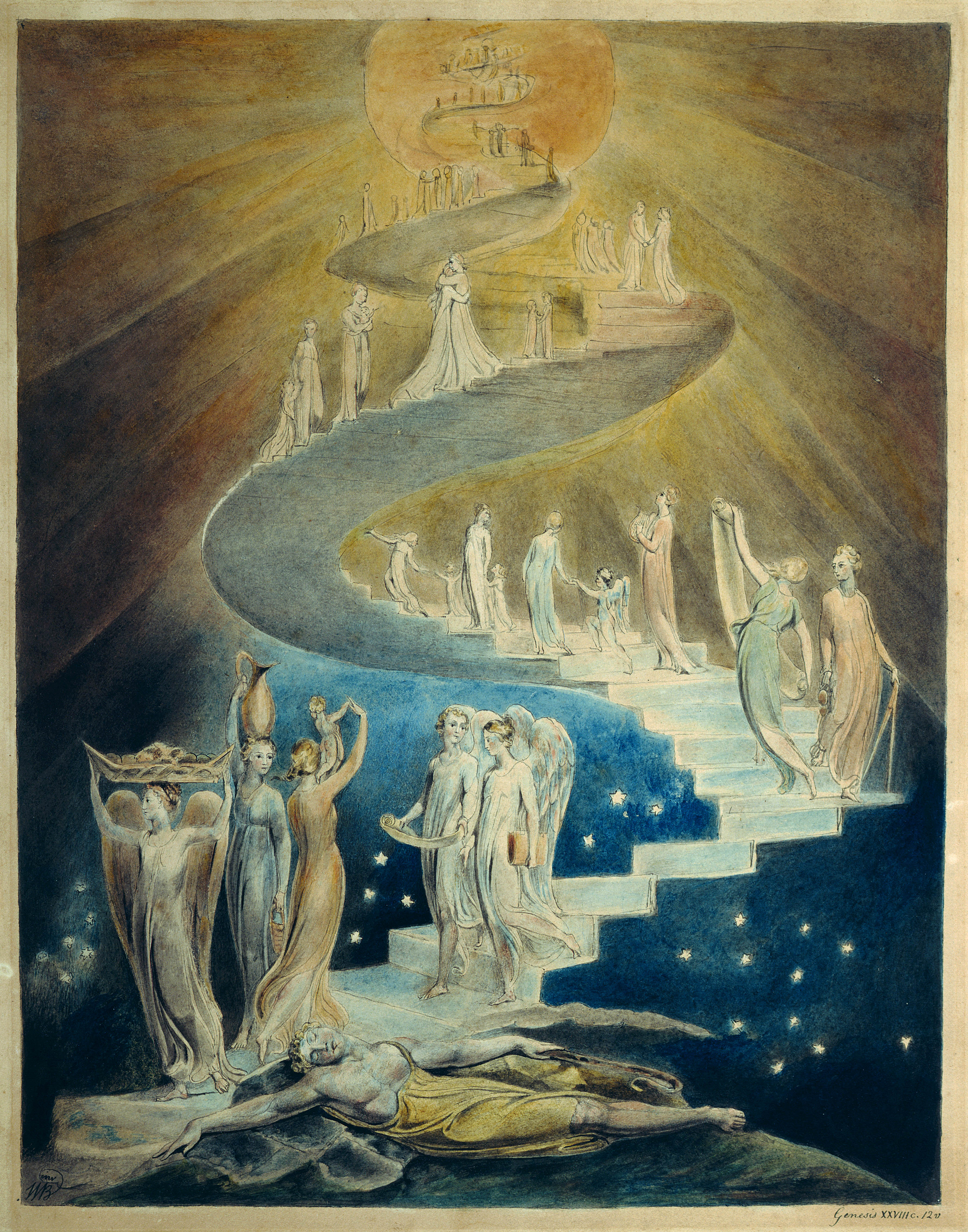
Jacob's Dream by William Blake (c. 1800, British Museum, London)

Near Luz en route to Haran, Jacob experienced a vision of a ladder, or staircase, reaching into heaven with angels going up and down it, subsequently referred to in popular culture as "Jacob's ladder". He heard the voice of God, who repeated many of the blessings upon him, coming from the top of the ladder.

In the morning, Jacob awakened, poured consecrating oil on the stone which he had slept on, and named the place where he had spent the night "Bethel", meaning "God's house". He then continued on his way to Haran.

=== Marriages and family ===
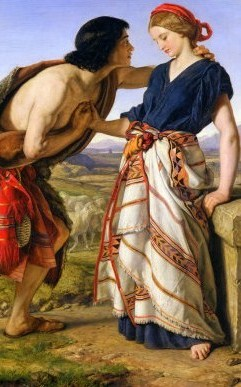
Rachel and Jacob by William Dyce

Arriving in Haran, Jacob saw a well where shepherds were gathering their flocks to water them and met Laban's younger daughter, Rachel, Jacob's first cousin; she was working as a shepherdess. Jacob he loved Rachel immediately. After spending a month with his relatives he asked for her hand in marriage in return for working seven years for Laban the Aramean. Laban agreed to the arrangement. These seven years seemed to Jacob "but a few days, for the love he had for her". When they were complete he asked to be able to marry her, but Laban deceived him by switching Rachel for her older sister, Leah, as the veiled bride. In the morning, when the truth became known, Laban justified his action, saying that in his country it was unheard of to give a younger daughter in marriage before the older. However, he agreed to give Rachel in marriage as well if Jacob would work another seven years. After the week of wedding celebrations with Leah, Jacob married Rachel, and he continued to work for Laban for another seven years.

In those seven years, Jacob fathered twelve children. He loved Rachel more than Leah, and Leah felt hated. God opened Leah's womb and she gave birth to four sons in quick succession: Reuben, Simeon, Levi, and Judah. Rachel, however, remained barren. Following the example of Sarah, who gave her handmaid to Abraham after years of infertility, Rachel gave her handmaid Bilhah to Jacob so that Rachel could raise children through her. Bilhah gave birth to Dan and Naphtali. Seeing that she had left off childbearing temporarily, Leah then gave her handmaid Zilpah to Jacob so that Leah could raise more children through her. Zilpah gave birth to Gad and Asher. Afterwards, Leah became fertile again and gave birth to Issachar, Zebulun, and Dinah, Jacob's only named daughter. God remembered Rachel, who gave birth to Joseph, and later, Benjamin.

=== Departure from Paddam Aram ===
After Joseph's birth and following God's guidance, Jacob decided to return home to his parents. Laban was reluctant to release him, as God had blessed his flock on account of Jacob. Laban asked what he could pay Jacob. Jacob suggested that all the spotted, speckled, and brown goats and sheep of Laban's flock, (Note: For "brown", read "black" or "dark-coloured" in many translations.) at any given moment, would be his wages. Jacob placed rods of poplar, hazel, and chestnut, all of which he peeled "white streaks upon them", within the flocks' watering holes or troughs, associating the stripes of the rods with the growth of stripes on the livestock. Despite this practicing of magic, later on Jacob says to his wives that it was God who made the livestock give birth to the convenient offspring, in order to turn the tide against the deceptive Laban. As time passed, Laban's sons noticed that Jacob was taking the better part of their flocks, and so Laban's friendly attitude towards Jacob began to change. The angel of the Lord, in a dream back during the breeding season, told Jacob "Now lift your eyes and see [that] all the he goats mounting the animals are ringed, speckled, and striped, for I have seen all that Laban is doing to you", that he is the God to whom Jacob made a vow at Bethel, and that Jacob should leave and go back to the land where he was born, which he and his wives and children did without informing Laban. Before they left, Rachel stole the teraphim, considered to be household idols, from Laban's house.

Laban pursued Jacob for seven days. The night before he caught up to him, God appeared to Laban in a dream and warned him not to say anything good or bad to Jacob. When the two met, Laban said to Jacob, "What have you done, that you have tricked me and driven away my daughters like captives of the sword?" He also asked for his stolen teraphim back. Knowing nothing about Rachel's theft, Jacob told Laban that whoever stole them should die and stood aside to let him search. When Laban reached Rachel's tent, she hid the teraphim by sitting on them and stating she could not get up because she was menstruating. Jacob and Laban then parted from each other with a pact to preserve the peace between them near Gilead. Laban returned to his home and Jacob continued on his way.

=== Journey back to Canaan ===
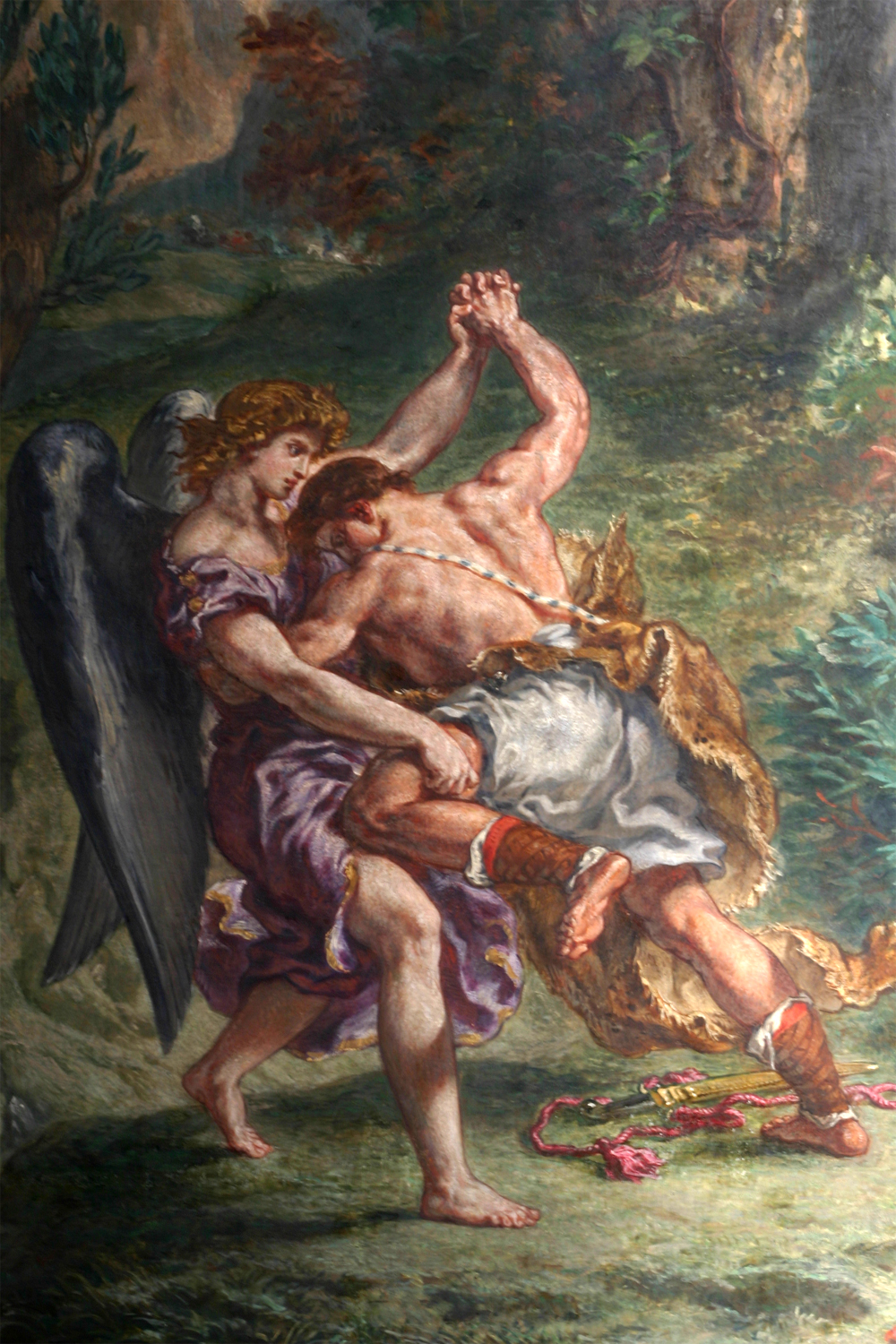
Jacob Wrestling with the Angel by Eugène Delacroix

As Jacob neared the land of Canaan as he passed Mahanaim, he sent messengers ahead to his brother Esau. They returned with the news that Esau was coming to meet Jacob with an army of 400 men. With great apprehension, Jacob prepared for the worst. He engaged in earnest prayer to God, then sent on in advance a series of tributes of flocks and herds, "a present sent to my lord Esau" from his servant Jacob.

Jacob then took his family and flocks and guided them across the ford Jabbok by night, although he himself remained on the northern side of the stream, being left alone in communion with God. (Note: Tyndale House's Living Bible suggests that Jacob crossed the Jabbok with his family and then crossed back to the other side.) There, a mysterious being appeared ("man", Genesis 32:24, 28; or "God", Genesis 32:28, 30, Hosea 12:3, 5; or "angel", Hosea 12:4), and the two wrestled until daybreak. When the being saw that he did not overpower Jacob, he touched Jacob on the sinew of his thigh (the gid hanasheh, גיד הנשה), and, as a result, Jacob developed a limp (Genesis 32:31). Because of this, "to this day the people of Israel do not eat the sinew of the thigh that is on the hip socket". This incident is the source of the mitzvah of porging.

Jacob then demanded a blessing, and the being declared in Genesis 32:28 that, from then on, Jacob would be called יִשְׂרָאֵל, Israel. While he is still called Jacob in later texts, his ancestors are known as the children of Israel or the Twelve Tribes of Israel.

Jacob asked the being's name, but he said "You must not ask my name!". Afterwards, Jacob named the place Penuel meaning: "I have seen God face to face and lived."

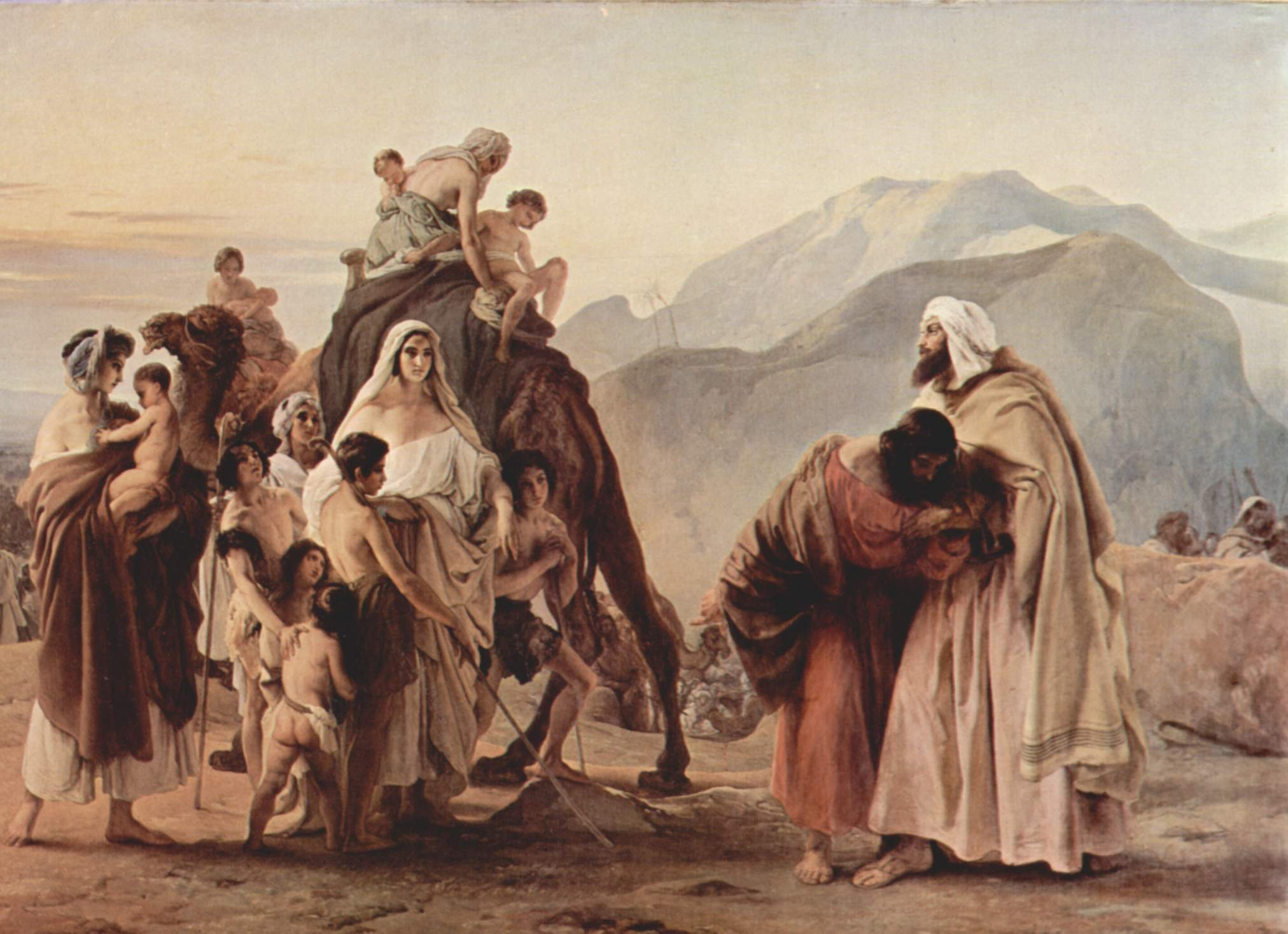
Esau and Jacob reconcile (1844) by Francesco Hayez

In the morning, Jacob assembled his whole family, placing the maidservants and their children in front, Leah and her children next, and Rachel and Joseph in the rear. (Note: Some commentators, such as H. E. Ryle, cite this placement as proof that Jacob continued to favor Joseph over Leah's children, as presumably the rear position would have been safer from a frontal assault by Esau, which Jacob feared.) Jacob himself took the foremost position to protect everyone else. Esau's spirit of revenge, however, was apparently appeased by Jacob's bounteous gifts of camels, goats and flocks. Their reunion was an emotional one.

Esau offered to accompany them on their way back to Israel, but Jacob protested that his children were still young and tender (born six to 13 years prior in the narrative); Jacob suggested eventually catching up with Esau at Mount Seir. (Note: According to the Sages, this was a prophetic reference to the End of Days, when Jacob's descendants will come to Mount Seir, the home of Edom, to deliver judgment against Esau's descendants for persecuting them throughout the millennia.) Jacob actually diverted himself to Succoth and was not recorded as rejoining Esau until, at Machpelah, the two bury their father Isaac, who lived to be 180, and was 60 years older than they were.

Jacob then arrived in Shechem, where he bought a parcel of land, now identified as Joseph's Tomb, and built an altar dedicated to El Elohe Israel (God, the God of Israel). In Shechem, Jacob's daughter Dinah was kidnapped and raped by the ruler's son, who desired to marry the girl. Dinah's brothers, Simeon and Levi, agreed in Jacob's name to permit the marriage as long as all the men of Shechem first circumcised themselves, ostensibly to unite the children of Jacob in Abraham's covenant of familial harmony. On the third day after the circumcisions, when all the men of Shechem were still in pain, Simeon and Levi put them all to death by the sword and rescued their sister Dinah, and their brothers plundered the property, women, and children. Jacob condemned this act, saying: "You have brought trouble on me by making me a stench to the Canaanites and Perizzites, the people living in this land." He later rebuked his two sons for their anger in his deathbed blessing (Genesis 49:5–7).

=== Return to Bethel ===
Jacob returned to Bethel, protected by a "terror of God" from the hostility of the cities close to which he passed, and built an altar there to God. God appeared to Jacob again and blessed him. The harm he might otherwise have suffered would most likely have arisen from continued conflict following Levi and Simeon's assault on the men of Shechem.

Although the death of Rebecca, Jacob's mother, is not explicitly recorded in the Bible, Deborah, Rebecca's nurse, died and was buried at Bethel, at a place that Jacob calls Allon Bachuth (אלון בכות), "Oak of Weepings" (Genesis 35:8). According to the Midrash, the plural form of the word "weeping" indicates the double sorrow that Rebecca also died at this time.

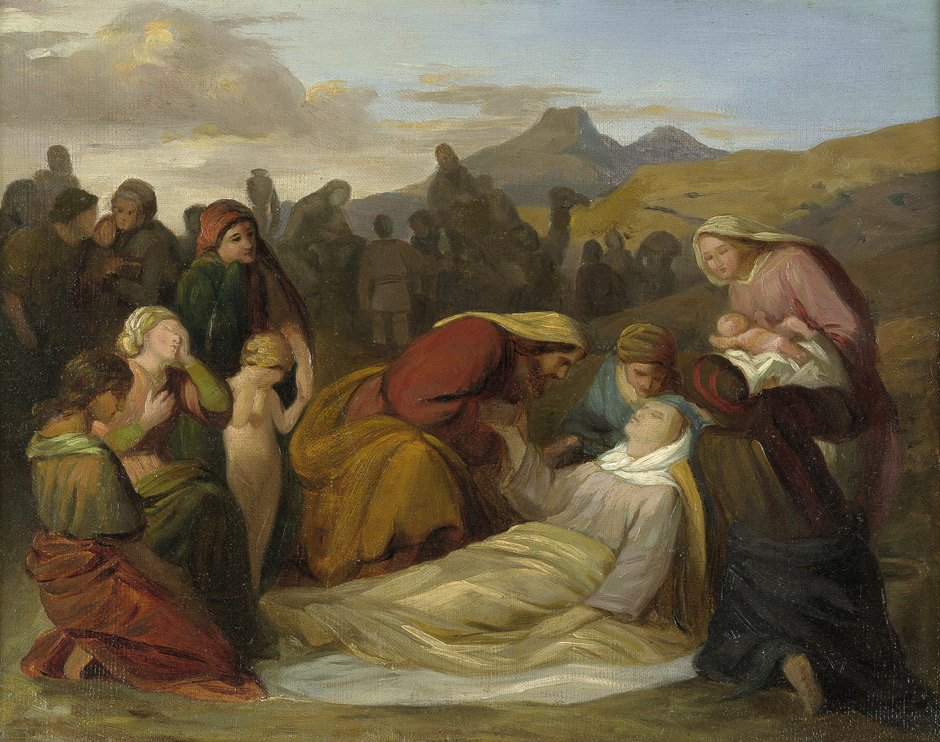
The death of Rachel after the birth of Benjamin (c. 1847) by Gustav Ferdinand Metz

Jacob then made a further move while Rachel was pregnant; near Bethlehem, Rachel went into labor and died as she gave birth to her second son, Benjamin (Jacob's twelfth son). Jacob buried her and erected a monument over her grave. Rachel's Tomb, just outside Bethlehem, remains a popular site for pilgrimages and prayers to this day. Jacob then settled in Migdal Eder, where his firstborn, Reuben, slept with Rachel's servant Bilhah; Jacob's response was not given at the time, but he did condemn Reuben for it later, in his deathbed blessing. Jacob was finally reunited with his father Isaac in Mamre (outside Hebron).

When Isaac died at the age of 180, Jacob and Esau buried him in the Cave of the Patriarchs, which Abraham had purchased as a family burial plot. At this point in the biblical narrative, two genealogies of Esau's family appear under the headings "the generations of Esau". A conservative interpretation is that, at Isaac's burial, Jacob obtained the records of Esau, who had been married 80 years prior, and incorporated them into his own family records, and that Moses augmented and published them.

=== In Hebron ===
The house of Jacob dwelt in Hebron, in the land of Canaan. His flocks were often fed in the pastures of Shechem, as well as Dothan. Of all the children in his household, he loved Rachel's firstborn son, Joseph, the most. Thus Joseph's half brothers were jealous of him and they ridiculed him often. Joseph even told his father about all of his half brothers' misdeeds. When Joseph was 17 years old, Jacob made a long coat or tunic of many colors for him. Seeing this, the half brothers began to hate Joseph. Then Joseph began to have dreams that implied that his family would bow down to him. When he told his brothers about such dreams, it drove them to conspire against him. Joseph also told Jacob about these dreams, and Jacob rebuked his son for proposing the idea that the house of Jacob would even bow down to Joseph. Yet, he contemplated his son's words about these dreams.

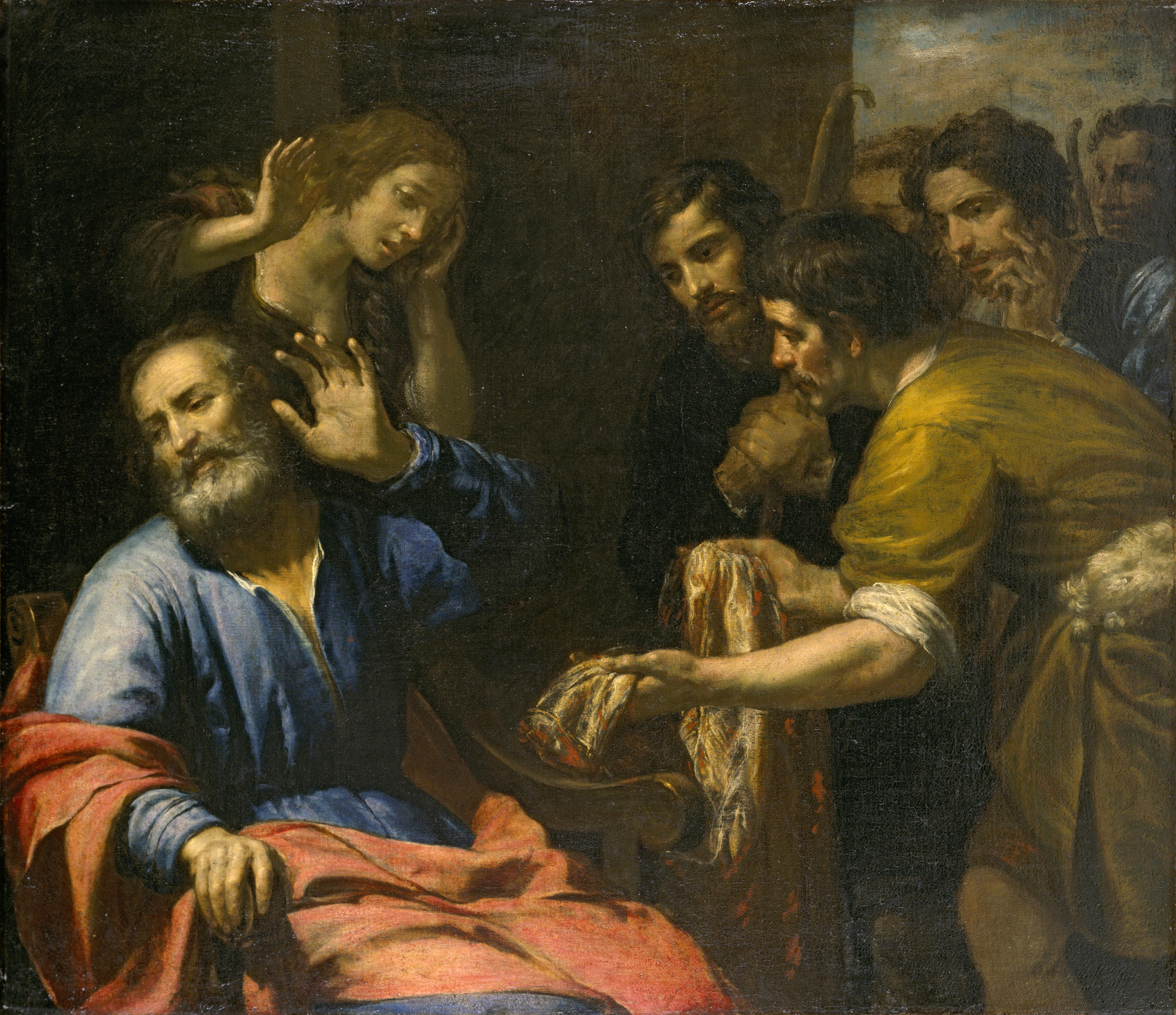
Joseph's Coat Brought to Jacob by Giovanni Andrea de Ferrari, c. 1640

Sometime afterwards, the sons of Jacob by Leah, Bilhah and Zilpah, were feeding his flocks in Shechem. Jacob wanted to know how things were doing, so he asked Joseph to go down there and return with a report. This was the last time he would ever see his son in Hebron. Later that day, the report that Jacob ended up receiving came from Joseph's brothers who brought him the coat laden with blood from a goat. Jacob identified the coat as the one he had made for Joseph. At that moment he cried, "It is my son's tunic. A wild beast has devoured him. Without doubt Joseph is torn to pieces." He tore his clothes and put sackcloth around his waist, mourning for many days. None of his family could comfort him during this time of bereavement and he spoke of mourning until he died.

The truth within the narrative was that Joseph's older brothers had turned on him, apprehended him, and ultimately sold him into slavery on a caravan headed for Egypt.

=== Famine of the Near East ===
Twenty years later, throughout the Middle East a severe famine occurred like none other that lasted seven years. It crippled nations. The word was that the only kingdom prospering was Egypt. In the second year of this great famine, when Israel (Jacob) was about 130 years old, he told his 10 sons of Leah, Bilhah and Zilpah, to go to Egypt and buy grain. Israel's youngest son Benjamin, born from Rachel, stayed behind by his father's order to keep him safe.

Nine of the sons returned to their father Israel from Egypt, stockpiled with grain on their donkeys. They relayed to their father all that had happened in Egypt. They spoke of being accused as spies and that their brother Simeon had been taken prisoner. When Reuben, the eldest, mentioned that they needed to bring Benjamin to Egypt to prove their word as honest men, their father became furious with them. He couldn't understand how they were put in a position to tell the Egyptians all about their family. When the sons of Israel opened their sacks, they saw their money that they used to pay for the grain. It was still in their possession, and so they all became afraid. Israel then became angry with the loss of Joseph, Simeon, and now possibly Benjamin.

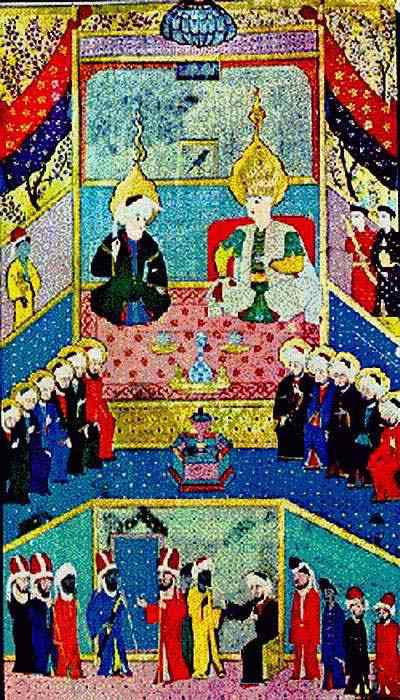
Joseph with his father Jacob and brothers in Egypt (Zubdat al-Tawarikh)

It turned out that Joseph, who identified his brothers in Egypt, was able to secretly return the money that they used to pay for the grain, back to them. When the house of Israel consumed all the grain that they brought from Egypt, Israel told his sons to go back and buy more. This time, Judah spoke to his father in order to persuade him about having Benjamin accompany them, so as to prevent Egyptian retribution. In hopes of retrieving Simeon and ensuring Benjamin's return, Israel told them to bring the best fruits of their land, including: balm, honey, spices, myrrh, pistachio nuts and almonds. Israel also mentioned that the money that was returned to their money sacks was probably a mistake or an oversight on their part. So, he told them to bring that money back and use double that amount to pay for the new grain. Lastly, he let Benjamin go with them and said "may God Almighty give you mercy... If I am bereaved, I am bereaved!"

=== Migration to Egypt ===
West Asiatic visitors to Egypt (c.1900 BCE)
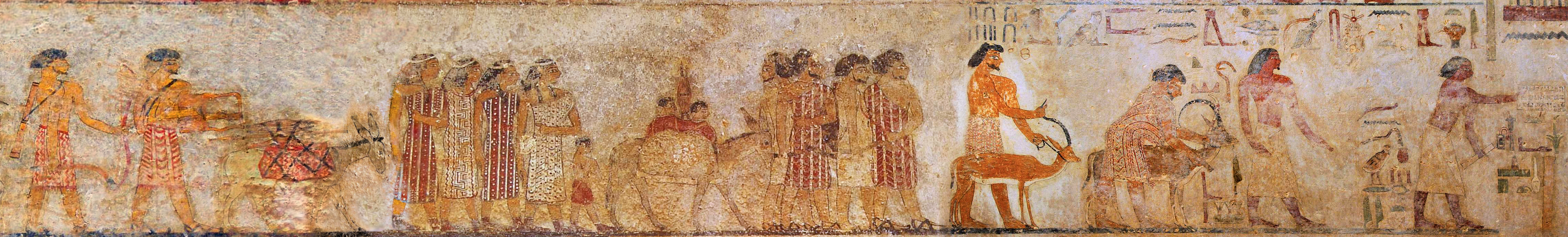
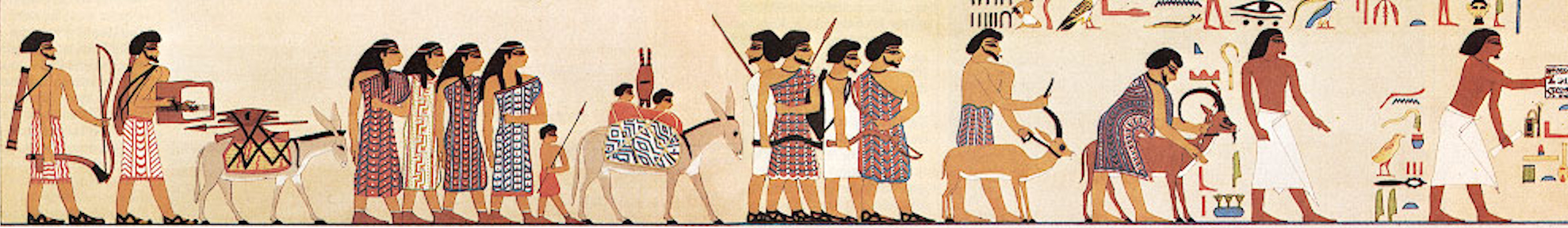
A group of West Asiatic foreigners, possibly Canaanites, visiting the Egyptian official Khnumhotep II c. 1900 BC. Tomb of 12th-dynasty official Khnumhotep II, at Beni Hasan.

When the sons of Israel (Jacob) returned to Hebron from their second trip, they came back with 20 additional donkeys carrying all kinds of goods and supplies as well as Egyptian transport wagons. When their father came out to meet them, his sons told him that Joseph was still alive, that he was the governor over all of Egypt and that he wanted the house of Israel to move to Egypt. Israel's heart "stood still" and just couldn't believe what he was hearing. Looking upon the wagons he declared "Joseph my son is still alive. I will go and see him before I die."

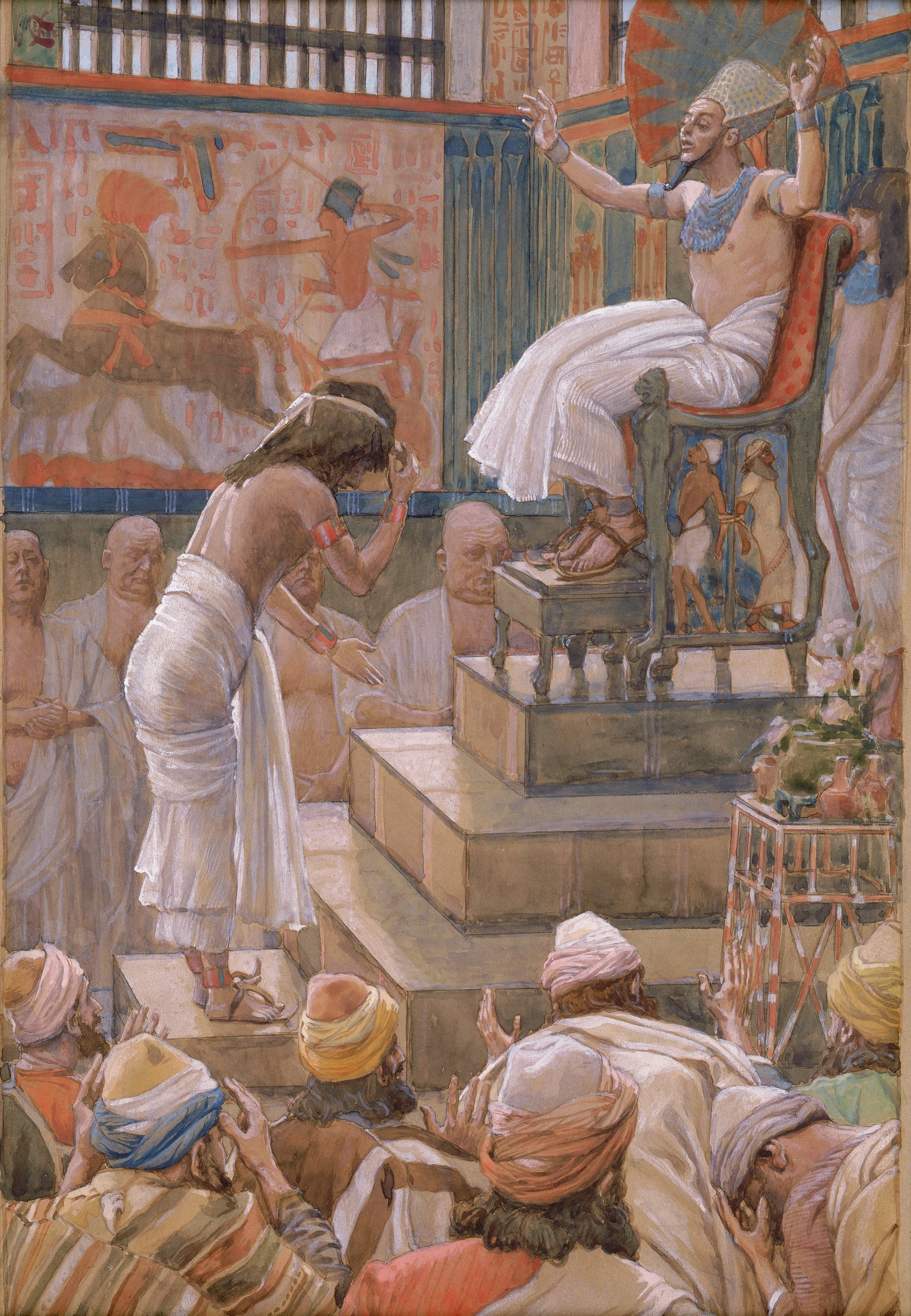
House of Israel welcomed by Pharaoh, watercolor by James Tissot (c. 1900)

Israel and his entire house of 70, gathered up with all their livestock and began their journey to Egypt. En route, Israel stopped at Beersheba for the night to make a sacrificial offering to his God, Yahweh. Apparently he had some reservations about leaving the land of his forefathers, but God reassured him not to fear that he would rise again. God also assured that he would be with him, he would prosper, and he would also see his son Joseph who would lay him to rest. Continuing their journey to Egypt, when they approached in proximity, Israel sent his son Judah ahead to find out where the caravans were to stop. They were directed to disembark at Goshen. It was here, after 22 years, that Jacob saw his son Joseph once again. They embraced each other and wept together for quite a while. Israel then said, "Now let me die, since I have seen your face, because you are still alive."

==== Pharaoh's meeting ====
The time had come for Joseph's family to personally meet the Pharaoh of Egypt. After Joseph prepared his family for the meeting, the brothers came before the Pharaoh first, formally requesting to pasture in Egyptian lands. The Pharaoh honored their stay and even made the notion that if there were any competent men in their house, then they may elect a chief herdsman to oversee Egyptian livestock. Finally, Joseph's father was brought out to meet the Pharaoh. Because the Pharaoh had such a high regard for Joseph, practically making him his equal, it was an honor to meet his father. Thus, Israel was able to bless the Pharaoh. The two chatted for a bit, the Pharaoh even inquiring of Israel's age which happened to be 130 years old at that time. After the meeting, the families were directed to pasture in the land of Ramses where they lived in the province of Goshen. The house of Israel acquired many possessions and multiplied exceedingly during the course of 17 years, even through the worst of the seven-year famine.

=== Final days: Blessing of Jacob ===
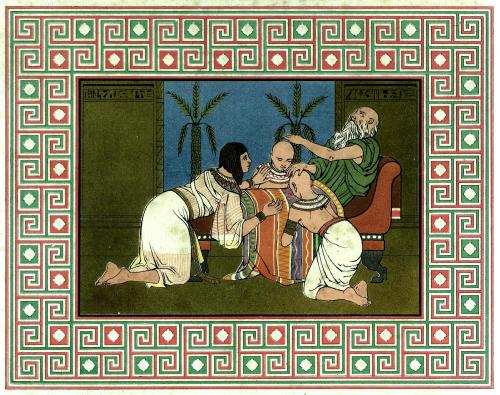
Jacob blessing Ephraim and Manasseh

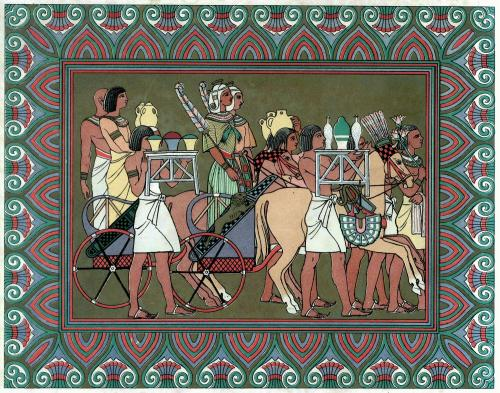
Jacob's funeral procession

Israel (Jacob) was 147 years old when he called to his favorite son Joseph and pleaded that he not be buried in Egypt. Rather, he requested to be carried to the land of Canaan to be buried with his forefathers. Joseph swore to do as his father asked of him. Not too long afterward, Israel had fallen ill, losing much of his vision. When Joseph came to visit his father, he brought with him his two sons, Ephraim and Manasseh. Israel declared that they would be heirs to the inheritance of the house of Israel, as if they were his own children, just as Reuben and Simeon were. Then Israel laid his right hand on the younger Ephraim's head and his left hand on the eldest Manasseh's head and blessed Joseph. However, Joseph was displeased that his father's right hand was not on the head of his firstborn, so he switched his father's hands. But Israel refused saying, "but truly his younger brother shall be greater than he". A declaration he made, just as Israel himself was to his firstborn brother Esau. Then Israel called all of his sons in and prophesied their blessings or curses to all twelve of them in order of their ages.

==== Death ====
Afterward, Israel died and the family, including the Egyptians, mourned him for 70 days. Israel was embalmed for 40 days and a great ceremonial journey to Canaan was prepared by Joseph. He led the servants of Pharaoh, and the elders of the houses Israel and Egypt beyond the Jordan River to Atad where they observed seven days of mourning. Their lamentation was so great that it caught the attention of surrounding Canaanites who remarked "This is a deep mourning of the Egyptians." This spot was then named Abel Mizraim. Then they buried him in the cave of Machpelah, the property of Abraham when he bought it from the Hittite Ephron.

=== Children of Israel ===
Jacob, through his two wives and his two concubines had 12 biological sons; Reuben, Simeon, Levi, Judah, Dan, Naphtali, Gad, Asher, Issachar, Zebulun, Joseph and Benjamin. The scene of Jacob mourning Joseph makes mention of him having a number of daughters, but no details are provided. Only one daughter, Dinah, is known by name. In addition, Jacob also adopted the two sons of Joseph, Manasseh and Ephraim.

The offspring of Jacob's sons became the tribes of Israel following the Exodus, when the Israelites conquered and settled in the Land of Israel.

== Religious perspectives ==
=== Judaism ===
There are two opinions in the Midrash as to how old Rebecca was at the time of her marriage and, consequently, at the twins' birth. According to the traditional counting cited by Rashi, Isaac was 37 years old at the time of the Binding of Isaac, and news of Rebecca's birth reached Abraham immediately after that event. In that case, since Isaac was 60 when Jacob and Esau were born and they had been married for 20 years, then Isaac was 40 years old when he married Rebecca (Gen. 25:20), making Rebecca three years old at the time of her marriage, and 23 years old at the birth of Jacob and Esau. According to the second opinion, Rebecca was 14 years old at the time of their marriage, and 34 years old at the birth of Jacob and Esau. In either case, Isaac and Rebecca were married for 20 years before Jacob and Esau were born. The Midrash says that during Rebecca's pregnancy whenever she would pass a house of Torah study, Jacob would struggle to come out; whenever she would pass a house of idolatry, Esau would agitate to come out.

Rashi explained that Isaac, when blessing Jacob instead of Esau, smelled the heavenly scent of Gan Eden (Paradise) when Jacob entered his room and, in contrast, perceived Gehenna opening beneath Esau when the latter entered the room, showing him that he had been deceived all along by Esau's show of piety.

According to Pirkei DeRabbi Eliezer, the ladder of Jacob's dream signified the exiles that the Jewish people would suffer before the coming of the Jewish Messiah: the angels that represented the exiles of Babylonia, Persia, and Greece each climbed up a certain number of steps, paralleling the years of the exile, before they "fell down"; but the angel representing the last exile, that of Edom, kept climbing higher and higher into the clouds. Jacob feared that his descendants would never be free of Esau's domination, but God assured him that at the End of Days, Edom too would come falling down.

According to the Talmud, Jacob did not flee directly to Haran (as would seem from the biblical text), but rather studied for 14 years at the study house of Shem and Eber before continuing towards Haran.

Jewish tradition and calculations back from Jacob's age as stated in Genesis 47:9, when he met Pharaoh, suggest that he was 77 years old when he arrived in Haran and met Rachel, and therefore 84, seven years later.

When Laban planned to deceive Jacob into marrying Leah instead of Rachel, the Midrash recounts that both Jacob and Rachel suspected that Laban would pull such a trick; Laban was known as the "Aramean" (deceiver), and changed Jacob's wages ten times during his employ (Genesis 31:7). The couple therefore devised a series of signs by which Jacob could identify the veiled bride on his wedding night. But when Rachel saw her sister being taken out to the wedding canopy, her heart went out to her for the public shame Leah would suffer if she were exposed. Rachel therefore gave Leah the signs so that Jacob would not realize the switch.

According to Rashi, the being Jacob wrestled with was the guardian angel of Esau himself, sent to destroy Jacob before he could return to the land of Canaan.

Jacob had still another reason for grieving the loss of Joseph. God had promised to him: "If none of your sons dies during your lifetime, you may look upon it as a token that you will not be put in (Hell of) Gehenna after your death." Thinking Joseph to be dead, Jacob had his own destiny to lament because he considered that he was doomed to that Hell.

Jewish apocalyptic literature of the Hellenistic period includes many ancient texts with narratives about Jacob, many times with details different from Genesis. The more important are the Book of Jubilees and the Book of Biblical Antiquities. Jacob is also the protagonist of the Testament of Jacob, of the Ladder of Jacob and of the Prayer of Joseph, which interpret the experience of this Patriarch in the context of merkabah mysticism.

=== Christianity ===
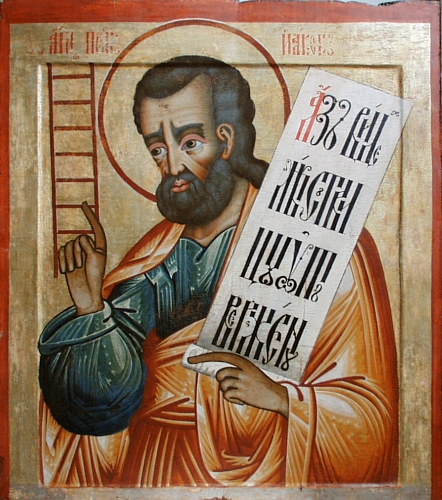
Russian Orthodox Icon of St. Jacob, 18th century (Iconostasis) of Kizhi monastery, Russia

The Eastern Orthodox Church and those Eastern Catholic Churches which follow the Byzantine Rite see Jacob's dream as a prophecy of the incarnation of the Logos, whereby Jacob's ladder is understood as a symbol of the Theotokos (Virgin Mary), who, according to Eastern Orthodox theology, united heaven and earth in her womb. The biblical account of this vision is one of the standard Old Testament readings at Vespers on Great Feasts of the Theotokos.

The Eastern and Western Churches consider Jacob as a saint along with other biblical patriarchs. Along with other patriarchs his feast day is celebrated in the Byzantine rite on the Second Sunday before the Advent (December 11–17), under the title the Sunday of the Forefathers.

Regarding the episode of Jacob's encounter, because the terminology is ambiguous ("el" in Yisra'el) and inconsistent, and because this being refused to reveal his name, there are varying views as to whether he was a man, an angel, or God. Josephus uses only the terms "angel", "divine angel," and "angel of God," describing the struggle as no small victory. Trachtenberg theorized that the being refused to identify itself for fear that, if its secret name was known, it would be conjurable by incantations. Literal Christian interpreters like Henry M. Morris say that the stranger was "God Himself and, therefore, Christ in His preincarnate state", citing Jacob's own evaluation and the name he assumed thereafter, "one who fights victoriously with God", and adding that God had appeared in the human form of the Angel of the Lord to eat a meal with Abraham in Genesis 18. Geller wrote that, "in the context of the wrestling bout, the name implies that Jacob won this supremacy, linked to that of God's, by a kind of theomachy."

=== Islam ===
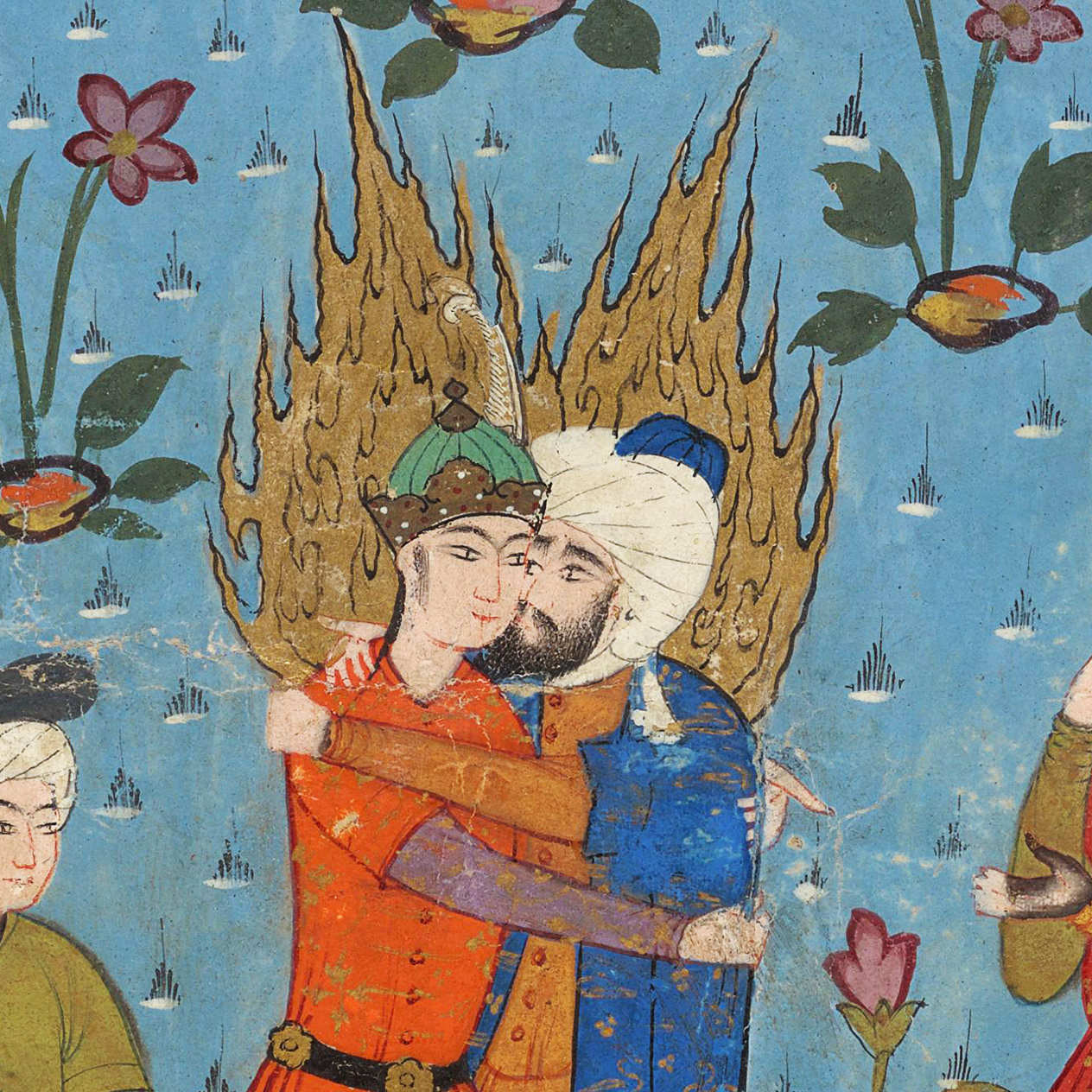
Islamic miniature of Ya'qub (right) joyously embraces and kisses his son (left), the returned Islamic prophet Yusuf, whom he thought dead.

Two further references to Isra'il (Arabic: إِسْرَآئِیل [ˈisraāˈiyl]; Classical/ Quranic Arabic: إِسْرَآءِیْل [ˈisraāãˈiyl]) are believed to be mention of Jacob. The Arabic form Ya'qub (Arabic: يَعْقُوب, romanized: Yaʿqūb) may be direct from the Hebrew or indirect through Syriac.

He is recognized in Islam as a prophet who received inspiration from God. He is acknowledged as a patriarch of Islam. Muslims believe that he preached the same monotheistic faith as his forefathers ʾIbrāhīm, ʾIsḥāq and ʾIsmā'īl. Jacob is mentioned 16 times in the Quran. In the majority of these references, Jacob is mentioned alongside fellow prophets and patriarchs as an ancient and pious prophet. According to the Quran, Jacob remained in the company of the elect throughout his life. (38:47) The Quran specifically mentions that Jacob was guided (6:84) and inspired (4:163) and was chosen to enforce the awareness of the Hereafter. (38:46) Jacob is described as a good-doer (21:72) and the Quran further makes it clear that God inspired Jacob to contribute towards purification and hold the contact prayer. (21:73) Jacob is further described as being resourceful and a possessor of great vision (38:45) and is further spoken of as being granted a "tongue [voice] of truthfulness to be heard." (19:50)

Of the life of Jacob, the Quran narrates two especially important events. The first is the role he plays in the story of his son Joseph. The Quran narrates the story of Joseph in detail, and Jacob, being Joseph's father, is mentioned thrice and is referenced another 25 times. In the narrative, Jacob does not trust some of his older sons (12: 11, 18, 23) because they do not respect him. (12: 8, 16–17) Jacob's prophetic nature is evident from his foreknowledge of Joseph's future greatness (12:6), his foreboding and response to the supposed death of Joseph (12: 13, 18) and in his response to the sons' plight in Egypt. (12: 83, 86–87, 96) Islamic literature fleshes out the narrative of Jacob, and mentions that his wives included Rachel. Jacob is later mentioned in the Quran in the context of the promise bestowed to Zechariah, regarding the birth of John the Baptist. (19:6) Jacob's second mention is in the Quran's second chapter. As Jacob lay on his deathbed, he asked his 12 sons to testify their faith to him before he departed from this world to the next. (2:132) Each son testified in front of Jacob that they would promise to remain Muslim (in submission to God) until the day of their death; that is they would surrender their wholeselves to God alone and would worship only Him.

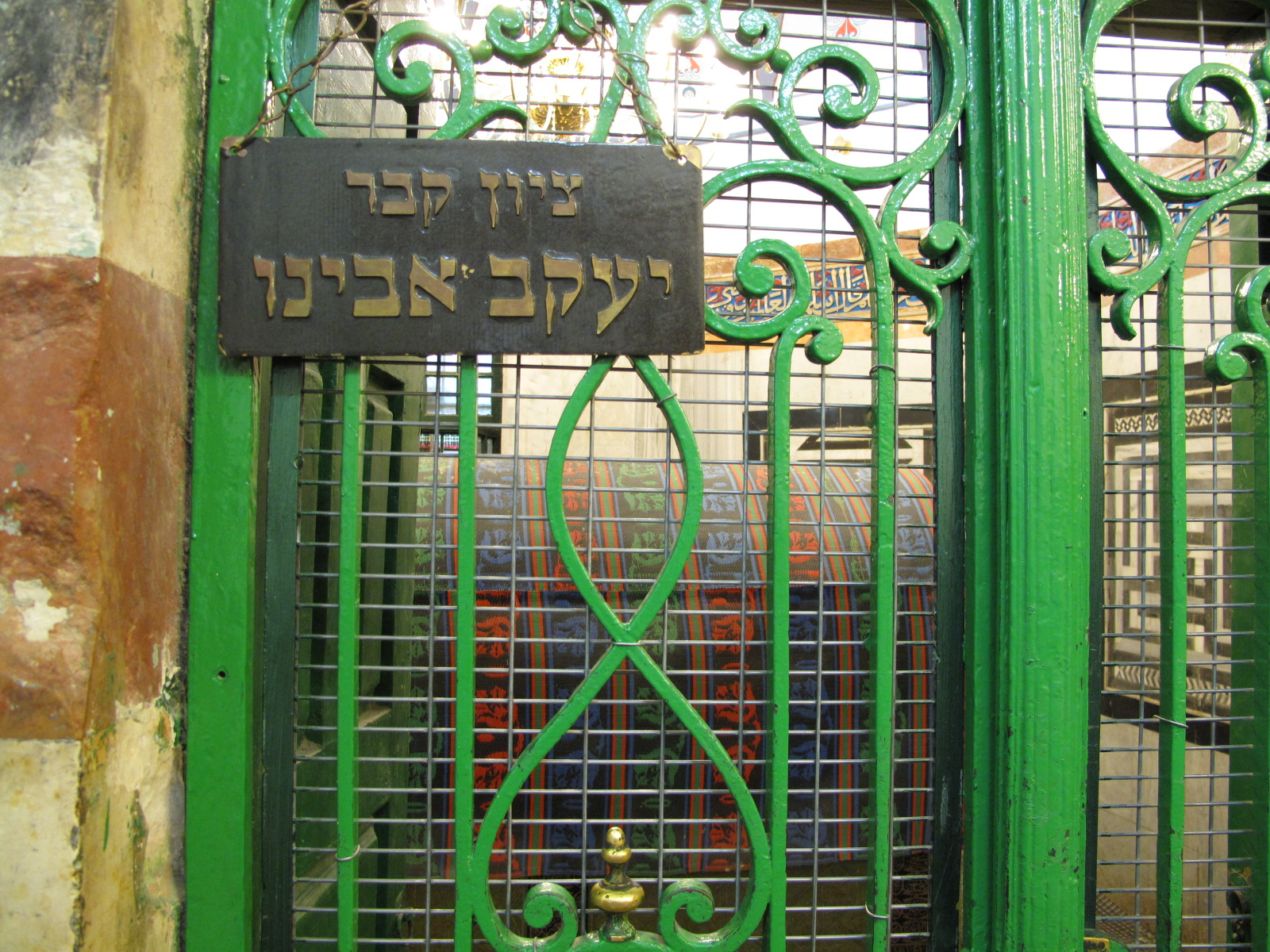
Cenotaph of Jacob, Cave of the Patriarchs, Hebron, Palestine

In contrast to the Judeo-Christian view of Jacob, one main difference is that the story of Jacob's blessing, in which he deceives Isaac, is not accepted in Islam. The Quran makes it clear that Jacob was blessed by God as a prophet and, therefore, Muslims believe that his father, being a prophet as well, also knew of his son's greatness. Jacob is also cited in the Hadith as an example of one who was patient and trusting in God in the face of suffering.

=== Nation of Islam ===
According to the teachings of the Nation of Islam (NOI), the original inhabitants of the world were black (referred to as the "Asiatic Blackman"), while the white race are "devils" who were created 6,000 years ago on what is today the Greek island of Patmos by the biblical and quranic Jacob, whom the group refers to as the "bigheaded scientist" Yakub. Though rejected by the vast majority of American Muslims, several NOI breakaway sects, including the Five-Percent Nation, subscribe to this narrative. The Nuwaubian Nation, an NOI offshoot headed by Malachi Z. York, promotes an alternative version of the Yakub story. In contrast to both the Bible and Qu'ran, the NOI and its offshoots teach that Yakub was born in Mecca.

== Historicity ==
Although archaeologist and biblical scholar William F. Albright maintained (c. 1961) that the narratives of Abraham and Jacob could be dated to about the 19th century BCE, John J. Bimson wrote in 1980: "Since then ... there has been a strong reaction against the use of archaeological evidence in support of the biblical traditions, and Albright's comment could not be repeated with any truth today." Nahum M. Sarna (1978) noted that an inability to date the narratives of the patriarchs does not necessarily invalidate their historicity, a view supported by Bimson, who admitted that "Our knowledge of the centuries around 2000 BCE is very small, and our ignorance very great."

Gerhard von Rad, in his Old Testament Theology (1962), postulated that the patriarchal narratives describe actual events subsequently interpreted by the community through its own experience. Other scholars, such as Thomas L. Thompson, view the narratives as late literary compositions (6th and 5th centuries BCE) that have ideological and theological purposes but are unreliable for historical reconstruction of the pre-settlement period of the Israelites. In The Historicity of the Patriarchal Narratives (1974), Thompson suggested that the narratives arose in a response to some emergent situation, expressed as an imaginative picture of the past to embody hope.

In The Ascent of Man (1973), Jacob Bronowski pointed out similarities between Jacob and Bakhtyar, who lends his name to Iran's Bakhtiari people. Both were herdsmen who had two wives, and are regarded as the ancestral patriarch of their nomadic people.

Archaeologist William G. Dever wrote in 2001: "After a century of exhaustive investigation, all respectable archaeologists have given up hope of recovering any context that would make Abraham, Isaac, or Jacob 'historical figures.'" Excavations in the Timna Valley produced what may be the earliest camel bones found in Israel or even outside the Arabian Peninsula, dating to around 930 BCE. This is seen by some as evidence that the stories of Abraham, Jacob, and Joseph (said to have taken place a thousand years earlier) were written no earlier than the 10th century BCE. While there is no support of their existence, Dever speculates that if there is anything to be said, it is possible that some patriarchs may have been Amorites.

Israel Finkelstein proposed that the Jacob-Esau narratives could have originated from 8th century BCE Kingdom of Israel because the conflict with Edom fits well not only in a Judahite context but also in an 8th century BCE Israelite context. Other scholars have suggested that the story could fit also in a 2nd millennium BCE context. Finkelstein suggests that there is archaeological evidence that 8th-century Israel interacted with Edom: the graffiti of Kuntillet Ajrud that mention both a "YHWH of Samaria" (center of Israel) and a "YHWH of Teman" (center of Edom). He proposed that the Jacob-Laban narrative might stem from the 8th century BCE, as Haran was then the western capital of the Assyrian empire. He also proposed that the earliest layer of Jacob cycle or the oldest Jacob tradition, which is the story of him and his uncle Laban establishing the border between them, might be a pre-monarchic tradition and could have originated from Gilead.

== See also ==
- Jacob sheep
- Jacob's Well
