= Atad =

Atad is an Old Testament Hebrew name meaning buckthorn.

Atad was the place where Joseph and his brothers, when on their way from Egypt to Hebron with the remains of their father Jacob, made for seven days a "great and very sore lamentation". On this account the Canaanites called it "Abel-mizraim" (Genesis 50:10–11). It was probably near Hebron, although it is described in these verses of Genesis as "beyond (west of) the River Jordan" and associated with threshing.

'Atad' is rendered as “bramble” in Judges 9:14–15, and as “thorns” in Psalm 58:9.
