= Simon of Peraea =

Former slave of Herod the Great who rebelled

Simon of Peraea, also known as Simon son of Joseph, was a former slave of Herod the Great who rebelled and was killed by the Romans some time after Herod's death. Some have identified him as possibly being the messiah of Gabriel's Revelation, but this is disputed. He is mentioned by Josephus and Tacitus.

== History ==
According to Josephus:

"There was also Simon, who had been a slave of king Herod, but in other respects a comely person, of a tall and robust body; he was one that was much superior to others of his order, and had great things committed to his care. This man was elevated at the disorderly state of things, and was so bold as to put a diadem on his head, while a certain number of the people stood by him, and by them he was declared to be a king, and he thought himself more worthy of that dignity than any one else."
"He burnt down the royal palace at Jericho, and plundered what was left in it. He also set fire to many other of the king's houses in several places of the country, utterly destroyed them, and permitted those that were with him to take what was left in them for a prey. He would have done greater things, but care was taken to repress him immediately. [The commander of Herod's infantry] Gratus joined himself to some Roman soldiers, took the forces he had with him, and met Simon. And after a great and a long fight, no small part of those that had come from Peraea (a disordered body of men, fighting rather in a bold than in a skillful manner) were destroyed. Although Simon thought he had saved himself by flying away through a certain valley, Gratus overtook him, and cut off his head."

== Messiah claim ==
A tablet, known as the Gabriel's Revelation or the Jeselsohn Stone, was likely found near the Dead Sea some time around the year 2000. It has been associated with the same community which created the Dead Sea scrolls, but does not mention Simon. Israel Knohl formerly read the inscription as a command from the angel Gabriel "to rise from the dead within three days". He took this command to be directed at a 1st-century Jewish rebel called Simon, who was killed by the Romans after Herod's death. Knohl believed that the finding "calls for a complete reassessment of all previous scholarship on the subject of messianism, Jewish and Christian alike". In 2009 the National Geographic Channel aired The First Jesus? which addressed the claims and controversy.

Knohl has eventually abandoned this reading, in favor of Ronald Hendel's reading (followed by Qimron & Yuditsky): "By three days the sign". He still maintains the historical background of the inscription to be as mentioned above. He now views Simon's death, according to the inscription, as "an essential part of the redemptive process. The blood of the slain messiah paves the way for the final salvation".

According to Livius.org, "Simon of Peraea may have 'put a diadem on his head', and his men must have created sufficient trouble to make the Romans send in the legions, but there are no indications that he was considered the Messiah."

== See also ==
- Jewish Messiah claimants
