= Divi filius =

Latin phrase meaning "son of a god"

Divi filius is a Latin phrase meaning "son of a god", and was a title much used by the emperor Augustus, the grand-nephew and adopted son of Julius Caesar.

== Octavian ==
On 1 January 42 BC, nearly two years after the assassination of Julius Caesar on 15 March 44 BC, but before the final victory of the Second Triumvirate over the conspirators who had taken his life, the Roman Senate recognised Caesar as a divinity. He was therefore referred to as Divus Iulius ("the divine Julius"), and his adopted son Octavian styled himself Divi filius ("son of the deified one, son of the god"). The fuller form, divi Iuli filius ("son of the divine Julius"), was also used.

Octavian used the title divi filius to advance his political position, finally overcoming all rivals for power within the Roman state. The title was for him "a useful propaganda tool", and was displayed on the coins that he issued.

== Other emperors ==
Since Augustus (Note: The title Augustus was officially conferred on Octavian by the Senate in 27 BC.) himself, some other Roman emperors were deified after death. The title Divi Filius was also applied to some of Augustus' successors, notably Tiberius, Nero, and Domitian.

== See also ==
- Lineage (anthropology)
