= Prayer of Joseph =

Pseudepigraphic text in the Old Testament

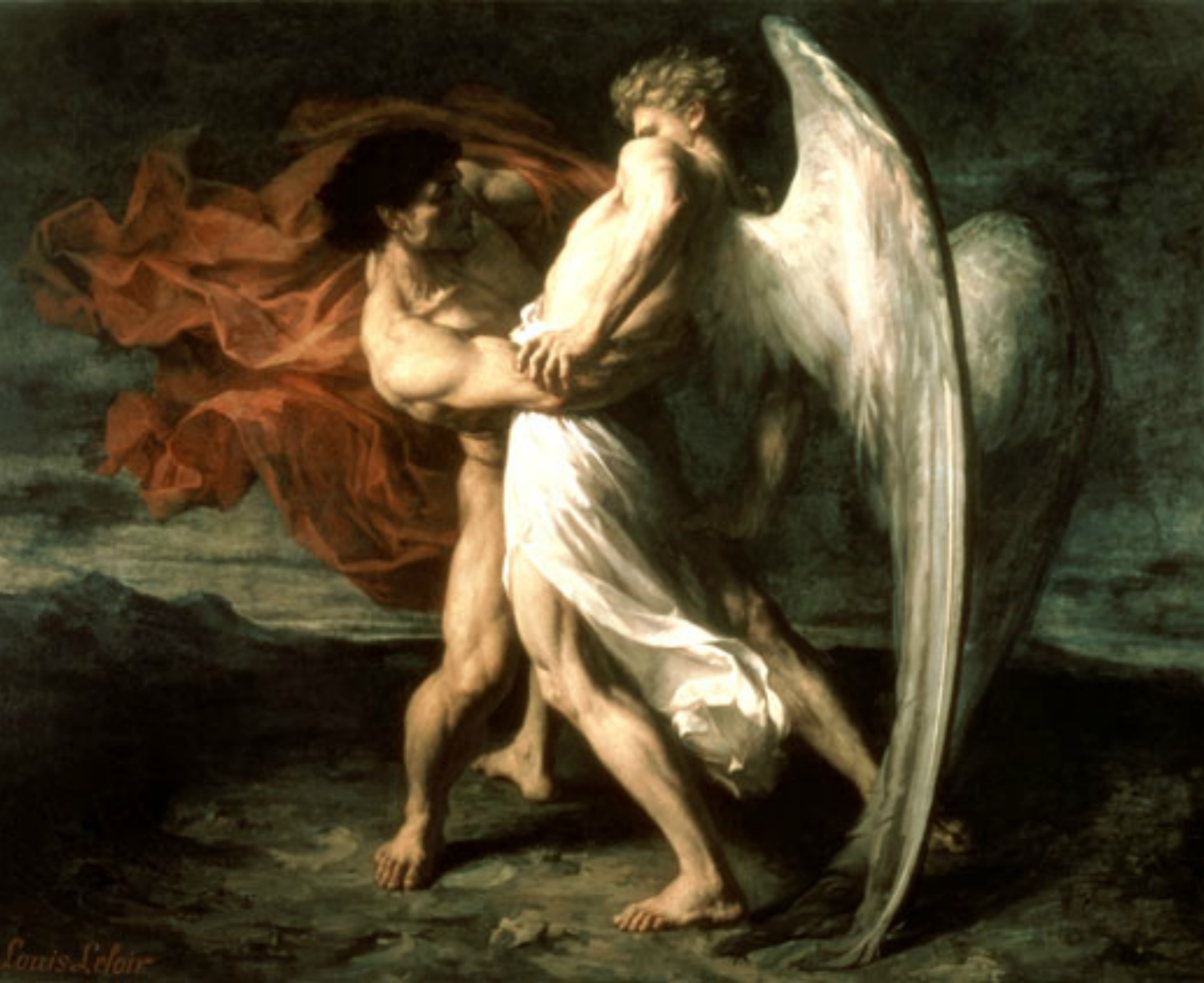
Jacob Wrestling with the Angel, by Alexander Leloir

The Prayer of Joseph is a pseudepigraphic writing (a text whose claimed authorship is unfounded) of the Old Testament. It was composed either in Aramaic (if Jewish) or in Greek (if Christian) in the 1st century AD. The text is almost lost and only a few fragments have survived in ancient quotations concerning the Biblical patriarch Jacob. The Prayer of Joseph narrates that Jacob was the incarnation of the angel Israel who competed with Uriel over their rank in heaven.

The Prayer of Joseph was well known in the early 3rd century by Origen who speaks of it as a writing not to be despised, and expressly states that it was in use among the Jews. The Prayer of Joseph is usually considered to be part of the Apocalyptic literature.

== Manuscript tradition and Provenance ==
Only three fragments have survived of the Prayer of Joseph: Fragment A, which is the longest, was preserved in Origen's "Commentary on the Gospel of John"- Book 2.31(25).186-192. Fragment B, a single sentence, has been found in the Praeparatio Evangelica - Book VI, of Eusebius of Caesarea as well as in the Commentary on Genesis of Procopius of Gaza and in an anthology of the writings of Origen compiled by Saint Basil the Great and Saint Gregory Nazianzus usually named Philokalia. Fragment C, also found in Philokalia, paraphrases the other fragments. The title itself Prayer of Joseph is found in many ancient documents. The Stichometry of Nicephorus shows that the Prayer of Joseph had a length of eleven hundred lines, thus only a very short part has survived.

Due to the shortness of the extant text, it is almost impossible to determine the provenance. Some scholars suggest it should be considered Jewish-Christian, others gnostic, others Jewish anti-Christian, others Christian anti-Jewish, while the probable thesis according to J. Z. Smith and others is that Origen was right to consider it Jewish.

== Content ==
The text of Fragment B is only one line, where Jacob says:

For I read in the tablets of heaven all things that shall happen to you and to your sons.

The context could be an elaboration of Jacob's blessing of his sons (in particular Joseph) found in chapter 48 and 49 of Genesis (compare Genesis 49:1). This could explain the reference to Joseph in the title of this writing even if the main character is Jacob.

The text of Fragment A is:

Thus Jacob says: "I, Jacob, who speak to you, I am also Israel, I am an angel of God, a ruling spirit, and Abraham and Isaac were created before every work of God; and I am Jacob, called Jacob by men, but my name is Israel, called Israel by God, a man seeing God, because I am the first-born of every creature which God caused to live.
And he adds: "When I was coming from Mesopotamia of Syria, Uriel, the angel of God, came forth, and said, I have come down to the earth and made my dwelling among men, and I am called Jacob by name. He was angry with me and fought with me and wrestled against me, saying that his name and the name of Him who is before every angel should be before my name. And I told him his name and how great he was among the sons of God;
Are you not Uriel my eighth, and I am Israel and archangel of the power of the Lord and a chief captain among the sons of God? Am not I Israel, the first minister in the sight of God, and I invoked my God by the inextinguishable name?"

== Theology ==
Fragment A is based on the Biblical struggle of Jacob with an angel in (Genesis 32:25–30) and takes a stand on the main issues of such Biblical episode:

- the etymology of the name Israel is shown to be derived from "a man seeing God". This etymology is possible with a Hebrew play of words, but it is not found in any ancient Hebrew text, while it is found in Philo's writings and in Greek hellenistic texts;
- the mysterious being who wrestled with Jacob is identified as Uriel, who is declared to be the least powerful of the seven archangels. This is in opposition to Justin's exegesis that saw in the mysterious being a figure of Christ himself;
- Jacob identifies himself using titles as ruling spirit, Angel of God, a man seeing God, the firstborn of every living thing, Chief Captain among the sons of God, the First Minister in the sight of God, which are used for Michael by the rabbinic literature, for the Logos by Philo, for Metatron by the Jewish mysticism and even for Christ by the early Christianity. These titles, that can be found in ancient Jewish writings, relate the Prayer of Joseph with the early Merkabah tradition.

The presence of angelic rivalry (both Israel and Uriel are here archangels) can be found in other apocryphal texts as the Apocalypse of Abraham and are related to Job 25:2.

== See also ==
- Jacob's Ladder
