= Gabriel's Revelation =

Ancient stone tablet found in Jordan

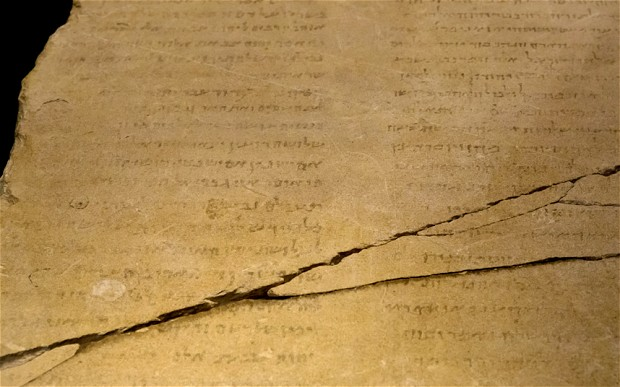
A detail of the Gabriel Revelation Stone on display in the Israel Museum (fair use full view).

Gabriel's Revelation, also called Hazon Gabriel (the Vision of Gabriel) or the Jeselsohn Stone, is a stone tablet with 87 lines of Hebrew text written in ink, containing a collection of short prophecies written in the first person. It is dated to the late 1st century BCE or early 1st century CE and is important for understanding Jewish messianic expectations in the Second Temple period.

== Description ==
Gabriel's Revelation is a gray micritic limestone tablet with 87 lines of Hebrew text written in ink. It measures 37 centimeters (width) by 93 or 96 centimeters (height). While the front of the stone is polished, the back is rough, suggesting it was mounted in a wall.

The writing is a collection of short prophecies written in the first person by someone identifying as Gabriel to someone else in the second person singular. The writing has been dated to the 1st century BCE or the early 1st century CE by its script and language. David Hamidovic's analysis instead suggests a date after 50 CE. A physical analysis of the stone found no evidence of modern treatment of the surface, and found the attached soil most consistent with the area east of the Lisan Peninsula of the Dead Sea. The text as a whole is unknown from other sources; it is fragmentary, so the meaning is quite uncertain. It is considered very similar to the Dead Sea Scrolls. The artifact is relatively rare in its use of ink on stone.

Scholars have characterized the genre of Gabriel's Revelation as prophetic, although biblical Hebrew scholar Ian Young expresses surprise that it does not use Hebrew language characteristic of biblical prophetic texts. Other scholars describe its genre as a revelatory dialogue similar to 4 Ezra or 2 Baruch or even as an apocalypse.

== Origins and reception ==
The unprovenanced tablet was reportedly found by a Bedouin man in Jordan on the eastern banks of the Dead Sea around the year 2000. It was owned by Ghassan Rihani, a Jordanian antiquities dealer working in Jordan and London, who sold it to David Jeselsohn, a Swiss–Israeli collector. At the time of his purchase, Jeselsohn says that he was unaware of its significance. Lenny Wolfe, an antiquities dealer in Jerusalem, reports having seen it prior to Rihani obtaining possession of it. Expert Hebrew paleographer and epigrapher Ada Yardeni reports that she first saw photographs of the tablet in 2003.

The first scholarly description of the find and the editio princeps of the text was published in April 2007 in an article written by Yardeni in consultation with Binyamin Elizur. (Note: Elizur is a specialist on the 9th century CE Pesikta Rabbati (Septimus 2015, p. 153).) Yardeni gave the writing the name "Hazon Gabriel".

As of 2011, the stone was located in Zurich. In 2013, the stone was loaned to the Israel Museum to be displayed in an exhibit there.

The stone has received wide attention in the media starting in July 2008, primarily due to Israel Knohl's interpretations.

== Authenticity ==
Most scholars have tentatively accepted it to be authentic, although Årstein Justnes, a biblical studies professor, has published a refutation of its authenticity. Doubts have further been expressed by Kenneth Atkinson and Jonathan Klawans.

== Interpretation and significance ==
Hillel Halkin in his blog in The New York Sun wrote that it "would seem to be in many ways a typical late-Second-Temple-period eschatological text" and expressed doubts that it provided anything "sensationally new" on Christianity's origins in Judaism.

Translations of line 80

- "In three days, live, I Gabriel com[mand] yo[u]" (Knohl 2008c)
- "In three days the sign will be [given]. I am Gabriel ..." (Qimron & Yuditsky 2009, p. 36)
- "In three days ..., I, Gabriel ... [?]" (Yardeni & Elizur 2011, p. 17 )
- "By three days, the sign. I Gabriel ..." (Knohl 2011, p. 59)

The finding has caused controversy among scholars. Israel Knohl, an expert in Talmudic and biblical language at Jerusalem's Hebrew University, translated line 80 of the inscription as "In three days, live, I Gabriel com[mand] yo[u]". He interpreted this as a command from the angel Gabriel to rise from the dead within three days, and understood the recipient of this command to be Simon of Peraea, a Jewish rebel who was killed by the Romans in 4 BCE. Knohl asserted that the finding "calls for a complete reassessment of all previous scholarship on the subject of messianism, Jewish and Christian alike". In 2008, Ada Yardeni was reported to have agreed with Knohl's reading. Ben Witherington noted that the word Knohl translated as "rise" could alternately mean "show up".

Other scholars, however, reconstructed the faint writing on the stone as a different word entirely, rejecting Knohl's reading. Instead, Ronald Hendel's (2009) reading of "In three days, the sign ..." has gained widespread support. In 2011, Knohl accepted that "sign" is a more probable reading than "live", although he maintains that "live" is a possible reading. However, the meaning of the phrase in the currently accepted reading is still unclear. Knohl still maintains the historical background of the inscription to be as mentioned above. He now views Simon's death, according to the inscription, as "an essential part of the redemptive process. The blood of the slain messiah paves the way for the final salvation".

David Hamidovic suggests it was written in the context of the Roman Emperor Titus’ siege of Jerusalem in 70 CE.

Gabriel's Revelation is considered important for broader scholarly discussion about Jewish messianic expectations in the Second Temple Period, specifically the themes of the suffering messiah and the Messiah ben Joseph, both of which are otherwise believed to be later developments. as well as the Davidic messiah.

== Publications ==
The Hebrew text and translation are available in several editions: Yardeni & Elizur (2007), (Note: Yardeni & Elizur (2007) includes only the Hebrew text. The English translation was first published in Yardeni (2008). The Hebrew and English were republished in Yardeni & Elizur (2011, pp. 13–17), with a note from the authors that Qimron & Yuditsky (2009) contained "important corrections ... to our reading", some of which were included in that edition (Yardeni & Elizur 2011, p. 11).) Knohl (2008c), Qimron & Yuditsky (2009), Knohl (2011), and Elgvin (2014). Photographs of the stone are printed in Henze (2011a, pp. 189–194). Newer high resolution images are available from the InscriptiFact Digital Image Library. Detailed linguistic studies have been performed by Bar-Asher (2008), Rendsburg (2011), and Young (2013).
