= Lia (miniseries) =

- Also known as: O desafio de Lia
- Genre: Miniseries; Drama; Biblical epic
- Created by: Paula Richard
- Written by: Cláudia Valli; Larissa de Oliveira; Méuri Luiza; Natália Piserni
- Directed by: Juan Pablo Pires
- Starring: Bruna Pazinato; Graziella Schmitt; Felipe Cardoso; Augusto Garcia; Leandro Lima; Brenno Leone; Júlia Maggessi; Suzana Alves
- Country of origin: Brazil
- Original language: Portuguese
- No. of seasons: 1
- No. of episodes: 10

Production
- Camera setup: Multi-camera
- Production companies: RecordTV; Casablanca

Original release
- Network: RecordTV
- Release: 26 June – 9 July 2018

Lia is a Brazilian miniseries produced by RecordTV and Casablanca. The series is created by Paula Richard. It premiered on 26 June 2018 and ended on 9 July 2018. Bruna Pazinato stars as the titular character. The series also has the participation of Graziella Schmitt, Felipe Cardoso, Augusto Garcia, Leandro Lima, Brenno Leone, Júlia Maggessi, and Suzana Alves.

The production of miniseries began in May 2018.

== Plot ==
Lia is a strong and good-hearted young woman who has never stopped believing in love despite the mishaps in her life. After losing her mother as a child and going through various mistreatment in the hands of her stepmother Laila, she falls in love with Jacó, but he only has eyes for her cunning sister, Raquel, a girl who likes to seduce the boys and covets riches, though she decides to accept his advances to make Lia suffer. Jacó made a deal with the young women's father, Labão, to work seven years in exchange for Raquel's hand, but on the wedding day, Lia is covered with a veil and is given in marriage by her father. After discovering the exchange the next day, Jacó questions Labão, who states that the family tradition is that the eldest daughter marry first, but that he could also marry Raquel in return for another seven years of work, which the boy accepts, obsessed with her sensuality.

Married to the same man, the sisters vie for the attention of Jacó, who attends to Raquel's luxurious desires, while humiliating Lia, and having to deal with Jacó's involvement with the two servants of the house, Bila and Zilpa. In spite of all contempt, Lia gives Jacó seven children: Rubem, Simeão, Levi, Judá, Issacar, Zebulom, and Diná, the only daughter in the house and the only child to receive affection from her father, which causes envy of the other brothers. Meanwhile Raquel manages to have only José, whom his father has as the only one worthy of true love, which causes rebellion in the children of Lia. Determined not to let her family collapse and prove her true love, Lia can gradually show Jacó that kindness can heal scars and that she is the right woman for him.

== Cast ==
- Bruna Pazinato as Lia Paddan
  - Laura Svacina as Young Lia
- Graziella Schmitt as Raquel Paddan
  - Sofia Budke as Young Raquel
- Felipe Cardoso as Jacó de Israel
- Augusto Garcia as Saul
- Leandro Lima as Rubem de Israel Paddan
- Brenno Leone as Simeão de Israel Paddan
- Júlia Maggessi as Diná de Israel Paddan
- Suzana Alves as Laila
- Théo Becker as Labão Paddan
- Saulo Meneghetti as Hananias
- Thaís Müller as Zilpa Mayan
  - Isabella Tigre as Young Zilpa
- Caca Ottoni as Bila Mut
- Felipe Cunha as Eliabe
- Bruno Peixoto as José de Israel Paddan
- Maurício Pitanga as Levi de Israel Paddan
- Bru Malucelli as Judá de Israel Paddan
- Marcus Bessa as Issacar de Israel Paddan
- Igor Fernandez as Zebulom de Israel Paddan
- Matheus Venâncio as Aser Mayan
- Walter Nunes as Gade Mayan
- Caio Lucas Leão as Naftali Mut
- Rafael Awi as Dã Mut
- Paula Jubé as Adinah
- Mariana Cysne as Dalila
- Pedro Monteiro as Esaú
- Silvio Matos as Isaque
- Rose Abdallah as Rebeca
- Paulo Carvalho as Rei Hamor
- Bruno Ahmed as Príncipe Siquém
- Nica Bonfim as Parteira

== Ratings ==
Season	Timeslot (BRT/AMT)	Episodes	First aired		Last aired	
Season	Timeslot (BRT/AMT)	Episodes	Date	Viewers (in points)	Date	Viewers (in points)
1	Mon–Fri 8:45pm	10	26 June 2018	9.9	9 July 2018	8.6
