= Simeon in rabbinic literature =

Allusions in rabbinic literature to the biblical character Simeon, son of Jacob, contain various expansions, elaborations and inferences beyond what is presented in the text of the Bible itself.

== Name ==
In the Rabbinic literature, Simeon's name is interpreted in a number of different ways. Genesis Rabbah takes it to mean "he who listens to the words of God". The Midrash HaGadol, however, interprets it as "there is sin", and sees in the name an allusion to Zimri, the Simeonite prince who sinned with the Midianite woman.

== Incident in Shechem ==
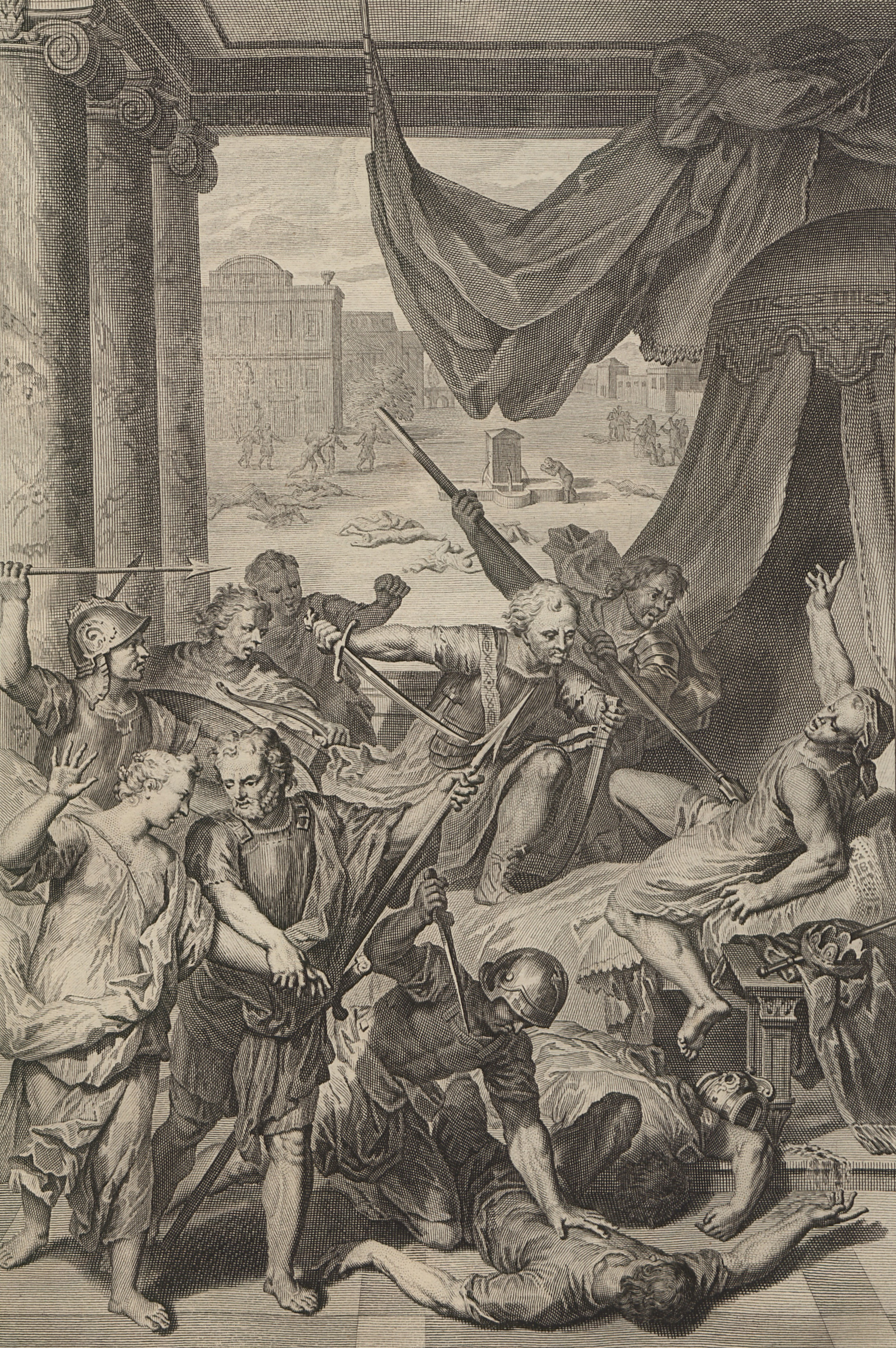
Simeon and Levi slay the Shechemites

Genesis 34 describes how Simeon and Levi kill the people of Shechem. The Sefer haYashar expands on this narrative, and says that when Hamor asked Dinah's hand for his son Shechem, Simeon and Levi, to outwit him, replied that some delay was necessary in order to consult their grandfather Isaac about the matter. After Hamor had gone it was Simeon who advised his brothers to require all the men of Shechem to be circumcised, and by this means place them at their mercy. The Sefer haYashar also has Simeon marrying his sister, Dinah.

The Sefer haYashar also presents Simeon as having a particularly powerful voice, and says that once, in the brunt of a battle, when he shouted, the enemy fled in terror at the sound.

== Relationship with Joseph ==
Among Joseph's brothers, Simeon was considered his most bitter antagonist. According to Sefer haYashar, it was Simeon who said: "Behold, this dreamer cometh. Come now therefore, and let us slay him" (Genesis 37:19-20). The Rabbis also held that it was Simeon who cast Joseph into the pit, and that afterwards he ordered that stones be thrown into it.

Rabbinic literature gives two reasons why Joseph chose Simeon, and not another brother, as a hostage (Genesis 42:24). First, Joseph desired to punish Simeon for having thrown him into the pit. Secondly, Joseph wished to separate Simeon from Levi, lest they together might destroy Egypt as they had destroyed Shechem.

According to Sefer haYashar, Simeon naturally was unwilling to go to prison; and when, at Joseph's call, seventy mighty Egyptians approached to take him by force, he uttered a cry so terrible that they became frightened and ran away. It was Manasseh, Joseph's son, who subdued Simeon and led him to prison.

== Death ==
According to the Seder Olam Zutta, Simeon died aged 120, seventy-five years after Jacob and his children went to Egypt, and hence three years before Reuben's death.

It is said that the remains of all the Patriarchs were enclosed in coffins and taken to the land of Canaan by the Israelites at the time of the Exodus.
