= Ahihud (biblical figure) =

Ahihud is the name of two biblical figures. In English, both figures are called "Ahihud," which represents two different names in Hebrew.

- Ahihud (Hebrew: אֲחִיחֻד ’Ǎḥîḥuḏ), a son of Bela, the son of Benjamin (1 Chronicles 8:7).
- Ahihud (Hebrew: אֲחִיהוּד ’Ǎḥîhuḏ), son of Shelomi. Ahihud was chief of the tribe of Asher; one of those appointed by Moses to superintend the division of Canaan (Numbers 34:27).
