= Flávia Lucini =

Brazilian model (born 1989)

- Born: 21 March 1989 (age 37); Francisco Beltrão, Paraná, Brazil
- Occupation: Model
- Partner(s): Leandro Lima (2012–present)
- Modeling information
- Height: 1.80 m (5 ft 11 in)
- Hair color: Light Brown
- Eye color: Brown
- Agency: Marilyn Agency (New York); Premium Models (Paris); The Lab Models (Milan); Premier Model Management (London); Trend Model Management (Barcelona); Munich Models (Munich); Joy Model Management (Sao Paulo); Stocksholmgruppen (Stockholm); MC2 Tel Aviv (Tel Aviv); METRO Models (Zurich)

Flávia Lucini (born March 21, 1989) is a Brazilian model.

== Biography ==
Lucini was born in Francisco Beltrão, 315 miles from Curitiba, state of Paraná, but was raised in Itapejara d'Oeste, also in Paraná. She is of Italian descent.

She was discovered by a scout who saw her driving a tractor. However, she decided to finish school before moving to São Paulo, where she worked at the now-defunct model agency, Wired.

Her first job as a model was a bikini feature for Vogue Brasil, posing for Bob Wolfenson.

== Career ==
=== International career ===
In 2006, when 16 years old, Flavia Lucini emerged on the international scene when she performed in her first fashion show, for the designer Jil Sander during Milan Fashion Week.

She posed for the British and American editions of Vogue, one of the lasts jobs made by Patrick Demarchelier, recognized for being one of the main collaborators of the Publisher Condé Nast publications, working mostly for the American, British and Chinese Vogue Magazine, as well as advertising campaigns for Calvin Klein, Carolina Herrera and other brands. Flavia's first cover magazine was made by the Bulgarian photographer Eliana Kechicheva, for Jalouse. Soon following came her first advertising campaign for Missoni Sport.

In 2016, he starred in the music video for Peter Yorn.

=== Fashion Shows ===
Miu Miu, Christian Lacroix, Andrew GN, Costume National, Chanel, Barbara Bui, Marc Jacobs, Calvin Klein, Byblos, Alberta Ferretti, Vivienne Westwood, Francesco Scognamiglio, Jill Stuart, Emporio Armani, Giorgio Armani, Hakan, Raphael Lauren, Oscar de la Renta, Carolina Herrera, Ralph & Russo, among others.

=== Campaigns ===
Missoni Sport, Furla, Etam, 212 Carolina Herrera fragrances, Liviana Conti, Nacre Voyage, Borsalino, Clarins, Lenny e Cia., Sonia Fortuna, Jogê, Verdissima, Cia. Marítima, Mango Sport, The Kloopes, among others.

=== Editorials ===
Vogue (Brazil, United States, England, Japan e Turkey), Amica Italian, Flair Magazine, Vanity Fair, Harper's Bazaar Italy, A Magazine, Elle (Brazil, Italy, France, Germany and Mexico), Jalouse Magazine, Profile Magazine, among others.

=== Record Holder of Catwalk ===
In 2007, Lucini set a recordfor the highest number of fashion shows in the same edition at Fashion Rio and São Paulo Fashion Week, scoring presence on the catwalks for brands like Lenny, Alexandre Herchcovitch, Gloria Coelho, Água de Coco, Blue Man, Reinaldo Lourenço, Colcci and many others .

== Filmography ==
- Pete Yorn - "She Was Weird"

== Personal life ==
She is married to the Brazilian actor, singer and model Leandro Lima. They met in Milan. They got engaged at 2015 Christmas, after four years of relationship. In 2015, the couple were photographed together for the French brand The Kooples. In 2022, she had a son, Tony, with her husband.
