= List of miniseries of RecordTV =

The following is a list of miniseries produced by RecordTV.

== 1990s ==
#	Year	Title	Author	Director
1	1997	A Filha do Demônio	Ronaldo Ciambroni	Atílio Riccó
2	1997	Olho da Terra	Ronaldo Ciambroni	Atílio Riccó
3	1997	Direito de Vencer	Ronaldo Ciambroni	Atílio Riccó
4	1997	Por Amor e Ódio	Vívian de Oliveira	Atílio Riccó
5	1997	Uma Janela para o Céu	Lilinha Viveiros; Paulo Cabral	Atílio Riccó
6	1997	Velas de Sangue	Lilinha Viveiros; Paulo Cabral	Atílio Riccó
7	1997	O Desafio de Elias	Yves Dumont	Luís Antônio Piá
8	1997	A Sétima Bala	Ronaldo Ciambroni	Atílio Riccó
9	1998	Alma de Pedra	Vívian de Oliveira	Atílio Riccó
10	1998	Do Fundo do Coração	Lilinha Viveiros; Paulo Cabral	Atílio Riccó
11	1998	A História de Ester	Yves Dumont	Luís Antônio Piá

== 2010s ==
#	Year	Title	Author	Director	Ref.
12	2010	A História de Ester	Vívian de Oliveira	João Camargo	
13	2011	Sansão e Dalila	Gustavo Reiz	João Camargo	
14	2012	Rei Davi	Vívian de Oliveira	Edson Spinello	
15	2013	José do Egito	Vívian de Oliveira	Alexandre Avancini	
16	2014	Milagres de Jesus	Renato Modesto	João Camargo	
17	2014	Plano Alto	Marcílio Moraes	Ivan Zettel	
18	2018	Lia	Paula Richard	Juan Pablo Pires	
