= Leandro Lima (actor) =

Brazilian model and actor (born 1982)

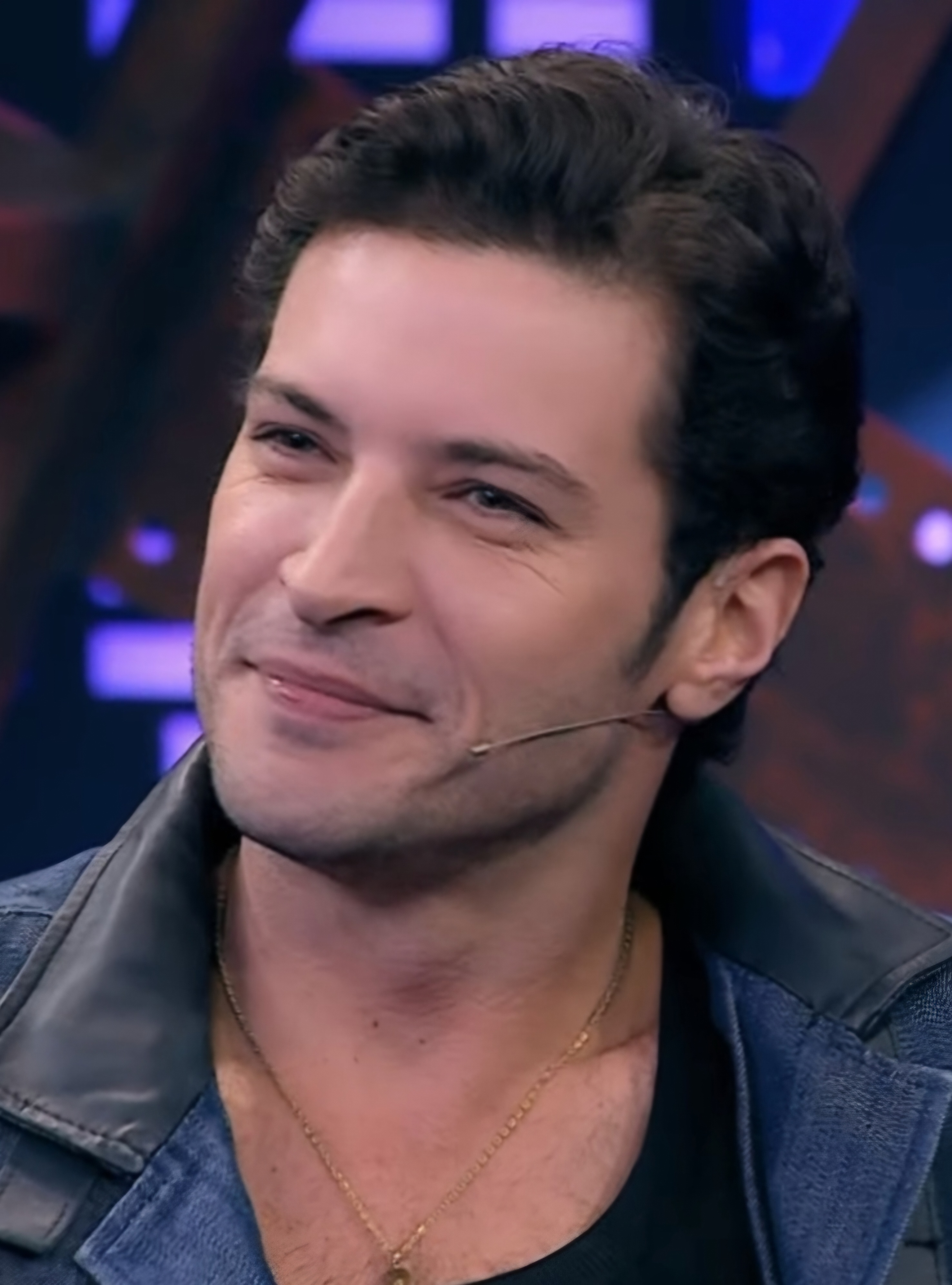
- Lima in 2024
- Born: Leandro Lima Lemos; 25 February 1982 (age 44); João Pessoa, Paraíba, Brazil
- Education: Lee Strasberg Theatre and Film Institute
- Occupations: Model; actor
- Years active: 1999–present
- Partner(s): Flávia Lucini (2012–present)
- Children: 2
- Modelling information
- Height: 1.85 m (6 ft 1 in)
- Hair colour: Brown
- Eye colour: Green
- Agency: Joy Model Management (São Paulo); New Madison (Paris); I LOVE Models Management (Milan); Storm Management (London); Traffic Models (Barcelona); Dominique Models (Brussels)

Leandro Lima Lemos (born 25 February 1982) is a Brazilian model and actor.

== Biography ==
Lima was born in João Pessoa, Brazil. He graduated in Publicity and Advertising at Centro Universitário de João Pessoa in 2004. In 2011 he graduated in theater from the José Lins do Rêgo Cultural Space. In 2012, Leandro studied performing arts at the Lee Strasberg Theatre and Film Institute in New York City.

== Career ==
In 1999, at the age of seventeen, he founded the axé band Ala Ursa, in which he became a vocalist and performed throughout the Northeast region of Brazil, in addition to singing every year in the traditional Carnival of João Pessoa. In 2005, aiming to gain recognition for the group, he participated in the fourth season of talent show Fama, in which he did not reach among the semifinalists, being eliminated in the first selections.

In 2006 he was invited by a producer to take a test to become a model, in which he was approved and signed with Joy Models, contrary to the common, where the boys appear to the world of fashion during adolescence. Leandro left the band Ala Ursa to pursue his career as a model, moving to Europe, where he paraded for major labels such as Versace, Calvin Klein and Christian Dior S.A., as well as advertising campaigns in Milan, Paris, London and Madrid. During that time he made small special appearances in soap operas during the time he was in Brazil, including a male prostitute in Passione, lover of the character of the actress Maitê Proença. In 2011 he starred in his first telenovela in the main cast, Insensato Coração, playing Patrick. In 2012, Lima moved to New York City to pursue his modeling career.

In 2013 he performed the tests to play Viktor in the telenovela Joia Rara, in Rede Globo but the actor Rafael Cardoso was eventually chosen for the role. The decision was made by director Amora Mautner, who believed that Leandro would fit better into the character David, which had not yet been filled. The actor premiered his first soap opera in the mainstream as a soldier who had fought in World War II and became a paraplegic.

This year also paraded in São Paulo Fashion Week. Without a fixed contract with the TV channel, Leandro returned to New York, where he modeled for labels such as Intimissimi and Ellus and for magazines such as Vogue Spain.

In 2017 he passed the tests for the medieval telenovela Belaventura, on TV Record, where he played Jacques, son of Machiavellian counts.

== Personal life ==
In 1999 he began to date journalist Daniela Lins, with whom he remained until 2007. The couple had a daughter, Giulia, born in 2000, when Leandro was only seventeen. In 2012 he started dating model Flávia Lucini, to whom he was engaged in December 2015.

== Filmography ==
=== Television ===
Year	Title	Role	Notes
2009	Poder Paralelo	Mafioso	Episode: "15 April 2009"
2009	Caras & Bocas	Gallery Customer	Episode: "14 May 2009"
2009	Caminho das Índias	Puja party politician	Episode: "4 September 2009"
2010	Dalva e Herivelto	Radialist	Episode: "6 January 2010"
2010	Viver a Vida	Bartender	Episode: "10 February 2010"
2010	Passione	Vitório	Episode: "16–19 August 2010"
2011	Insensato Coração	Patrick de Jesus	
2013	Joia Rara	Davi Monteiro	
2015	Saltibum	Participant	Season 2
2016	Chapa Quente	Alberto	Episode: "De Ciumento e Louco..."
2017	Belaventura	Jacques de Alencastro Bourbon	
2018–present	Dancing Brasil	Reporter	
2018	Lia	Rubem de Israel Paddan	
2019	Most Beautiful Thing	Francisco “Chico” Carvalho	Also known as "Girls from Ipanema"
2020	La Doña 2		
2022	Pantanal	Levi	Episode: "15 April - 13 June 2022"
2023	Terra e Paixão	Delegado Marino Guerra	
2025	Três Graças	Herculano Gomide	

=== Film ===
Year	Title	Role
2017	Solteira Quase Surtando	Felipe
