= Simeon (son of Jacob) =

Biblical figure and son of Jacob and Leah

- שִׁמְעוֹן
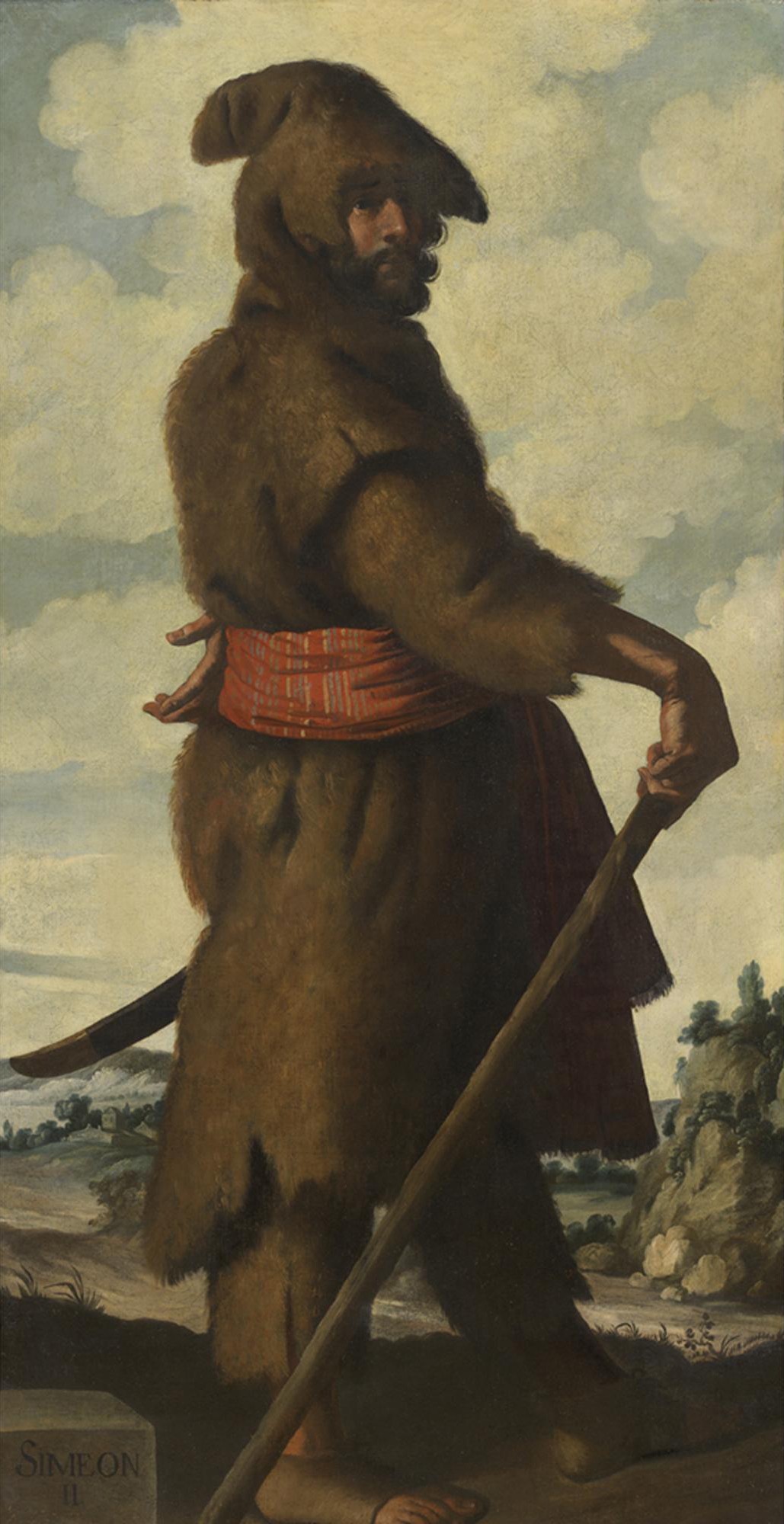
- Painting by Francisco de Zurbarán (from Jacob and his twelve sons, c. 1640–45)
- Pronunciation: Šim'ōn
- Born: 1568 BCE or 1567 BCE (21 or 28 Tevet, AM 2194); Harran, Paddan Aram
- Died: Aged 120 or 127
- Resting place: Maybe Shim'on Ben Ya'akov Tomb, Israel; 32.202224°N 34.959608°E
- Children: Jemuel/Nemuel (son/fourth and fifth cousin); Jamin (son/fourth and fifth cousin); Ohad (son/fourth and fifth cousin); Jachin (son/fourth and fifth cousin); Zohar (son/fourth and fifth cousin); Shaul (son of the Canaanite woman)
- Parents: Jacob (father); Leah (mother)
- Relatives: Reuben (brother); Levi (brother); Judah (brother); Dan (half brother); Naphtali (half brother); Gad (half brother); Asher (half brother); Issachar (brother); Zebulun (brother); Dinah (sister); Joseph (half brother); Benjamin (half brother); Rachel (aunt/stepmother); Esau (uncle); Aholibamah/Judith (aunt); Basemath/Adah (aunt); Mahalath/Bashemath (aunt); Laban (grandfather); Isaac (grandfather); Rebecca (grandmother); Abraham (great-grandfather); Sarah (great-grandmother)

Simeon (Hebrew: שִׁמְעוֹן, Modern: Šīmʾōn, Tiberian: Šīmʾōn) was the second of the six sons of Jacob and Leah, and the founder of the Israelite tribe of Simeon, according to the Book of Genesis in the Hebrew Bible. Biblical scholars regard the tribe as part of the original Israelite confederation. Simeon is absent from some of the passages in the Bible which list the other tribes, and some scholars think that it was not initially regarded as a distinct tribe. Some Biblical scholars believe that Simeon was not considered a distinct tribe due to the Zimri scandal. The Blessing of Moses, before his death, had omitted the Tribe of Simeon because Jacob had castigated him, Genesis 49:5-7, and because of the affair of Baal-peor.

== Simeon's name ==
The text of the Torah states that the name of Simeon reflects Leah's belief that God had heard that she was unloved by Jacob, who preferred her sister Rachel. This implies a derivation from the Hebrew root (שְׁמַע) šāma, meaning 'to hear', 'to listen', and the verb (אוֹנִי) ʾōnī, meaning 'my suffering'. At other times, it is thought to derive from (שָׁם) šhām and (עָוֺן) ʿāvōn, meaning 'there is sin', which is argued to be a prophetic reference to Zimri's sexual miscegenation with a Midianite woman, a type of relationship which rabbinical sources regard as sinful.

Alternatively, Ferdinand Hitzig, W. R. Smith, Stade, and Kerber compared שִׁמְעוֹן Šīmə‘ōn to Arabic سِمع simˤ, 'the offspring of the hyena and the female wolf'; as supports, Smith points to Arabic tribal names Simˤ, 'a subdivision of the defenders (the Medinites)', and Samˤān, 'a subdivision of Tamim'.

== Biblical narrative ==
=== Birth ===
Genesis 29:31-35 records the birth of four sons to Jacob and Leah: Reuben, Simeon, Levi, and Judah. Leah then "stopped having children" for a time, although she subsequently gave birth to Issachar, Zebulun and Dinah.

=== Simeon in Shechem ===
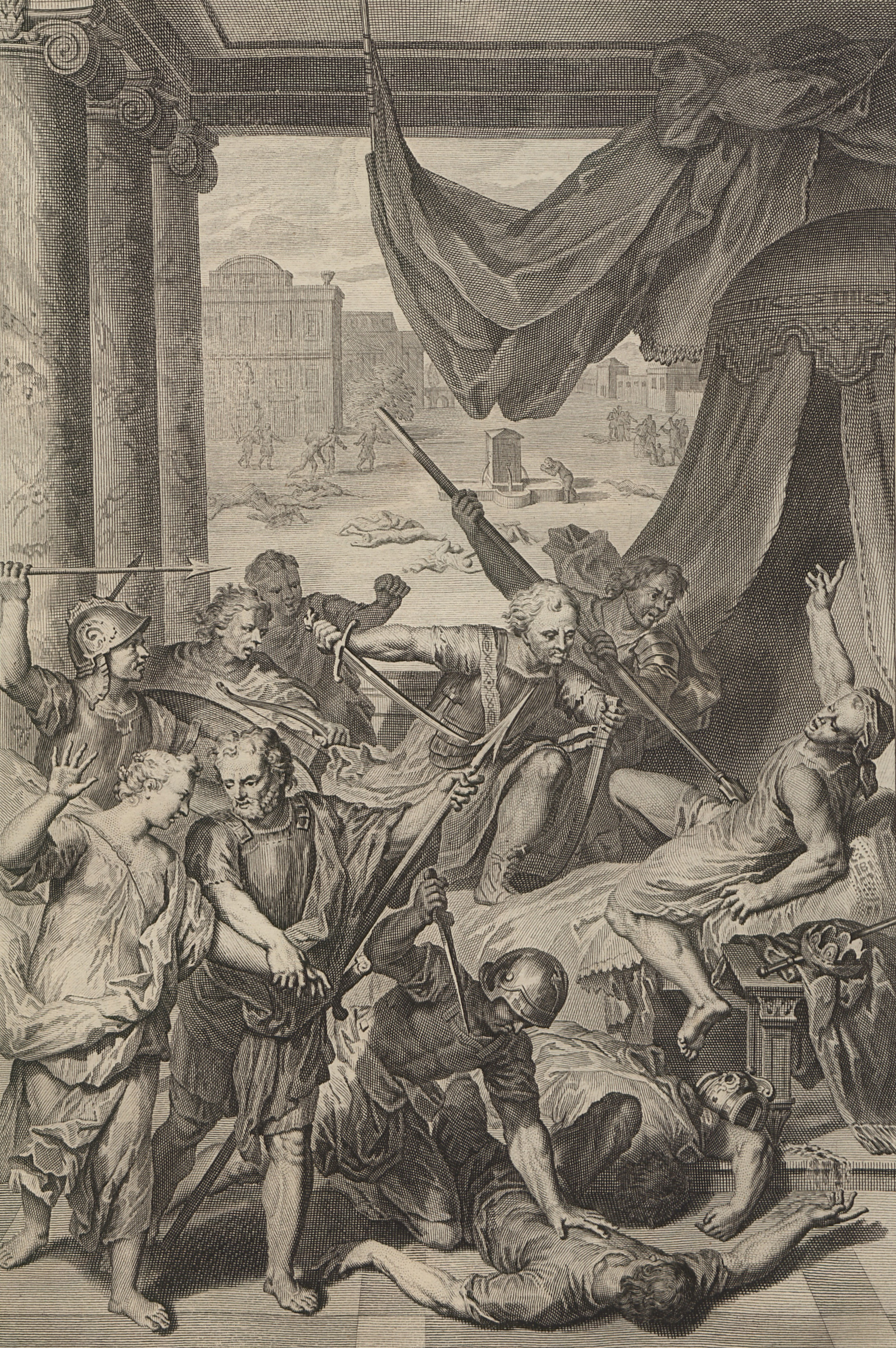
Simeon and Levi slay the Shechemites

In the Torah account, Simeon's sister Dinah is raped (or in some versions, seduced) by a Canaanite named Shechem. Simeon and his brother Levi take violent revenge against the inhabitants of Shechem by tricking them into circumcising themselves and then massacring them while they are weakened. The account dramatizes the tension between marriage within a group (endogamy) and with outsiders (exogamy).

Jacob castigates Simeon and Levi for this, as their actions have placed the family in danger of a retaliatory strike by their neighbors. Later, in his final blessing, he condemns Simeon's descendants to become divided and scattered. Some Biblical scholars regard the account of the rape of Dinah as an aetiological myth, created by the Jahwist, to justify the presence of a sanctuary at Shechem; in comparison to the Elohist's justification of the Shechem sanctuary, where the land is simply purchased by Jacob, and dedicated to El Elohe Israel (meaning El is the God of Israel, mighty is the God of Israel, or God, the God of Israel). The Jahwist's account is viewed as a veiled slight against the sanctuary.

Biblical scholars view Simeon's vengeance and punishment in the blessing as aetiological postdictions designed to explain why, in the time of the author of the blessing (900-700BC), the tribe of Simeon was dwindling out of existence. The midrashic book of Jasher argues that Simeon deceived Hamor by insisting that the men of Shechem would need to be circumcised. It goes on to say that Simeon was extremely strong, despite only being 14 years old, and was able to slaughter all the men of Shechem nearly single-handedly, only having assistance from his brother Levi, and captured 100 young women, marrying the one named "Bonah."

=== Relation with Joseph ===
The classical rabbinical sources argue that Simeon was very fearless, but also was particularly envious, and so had always been antagonistic and spiteful towards Joseph, owing to Joseph being Jacob's favourite son. The midrashic book of Jasher argues that Simeon was the one who proposed that the brothers should kill Joseph. Other classical sources argue that it was Simeon who threw Joseph into a pit and became furious when he found out that Judah had sold Joseph rather than killed him. According to the classical sources, Simeon suffered divine punishment for this inhumanity, with his right hand withered, but this caused Simeon to repent, so his hand was restored a week later.

In the biblical Joseph narrative, when Joseph, having settled in Egypt, asks his brothers to bring Benjamin to him, he takes Simeon hostage to ensure they return. According to classical rabbinical sources, Joseph chose Simeon to be the hostage because he was concerned that if Simeon was not separated from Levi, then Levi and Simeon might destroy Egypt together, since they had already destroyed Shechem. Another theory was that Joseph singled out Simeon due to his prominent role in Joseph's betrayal. According to the midrashic book of Jasher, Simeon was not willing to become a hostage, so Joseph sent 70 strong Egyptians to take Simeon by force, but Simeon had a very powerful voice, and so was able to scare off the Egyptians simply by shouting. The text states that Simeon was eventually subdued by Manasseh, and imprisoned.

According to the Book of Jubilees, Simeon was born on 21 Tevet, and according to the Book of Genesis, he had six sons. Although some classical rabbinical sources argue that the mother of his children, and his wife, was Bonah, one of the women from Shechem, other classical rabbinical sources argue that Simeon's wife (and the mother of his children) was Dinah, his sister, who had insisted on the marriage before she would be willing to leave Shechem's home (Shechem was her rapist/lover). Many of the rabbinical sources argue that Simeon died aged 120, roughly three years before the death of his brother Reuben. However, Numbers Rabbah states that Simeon became the senior of the brothers after Reuben had died.

== Tomb ==
A Samaritan tradition recorded in the late 19th century considered Neby Shem'on, a maqam near Kfar Saba, to be the burial place of Simeon.

== Children ==
- Jemuel (also called Nemuel) - The Clan of The Nemuelites
- Jamin - The Clan of The Jaminites
- Ohad
- Jachin (also called Jarib) - The Clan of The Jachinites
- Zohar (also called Zerah) - The Clan of The Zerahites
- Shaul (also called Saul) (Son of The Canaanite Woman) - The Clan of The Saulites

== See also ==
- Tribe of Simeon
- Simeon in rabbinic literature
