= Leah =

Biblical matriarch

- לֵאָה
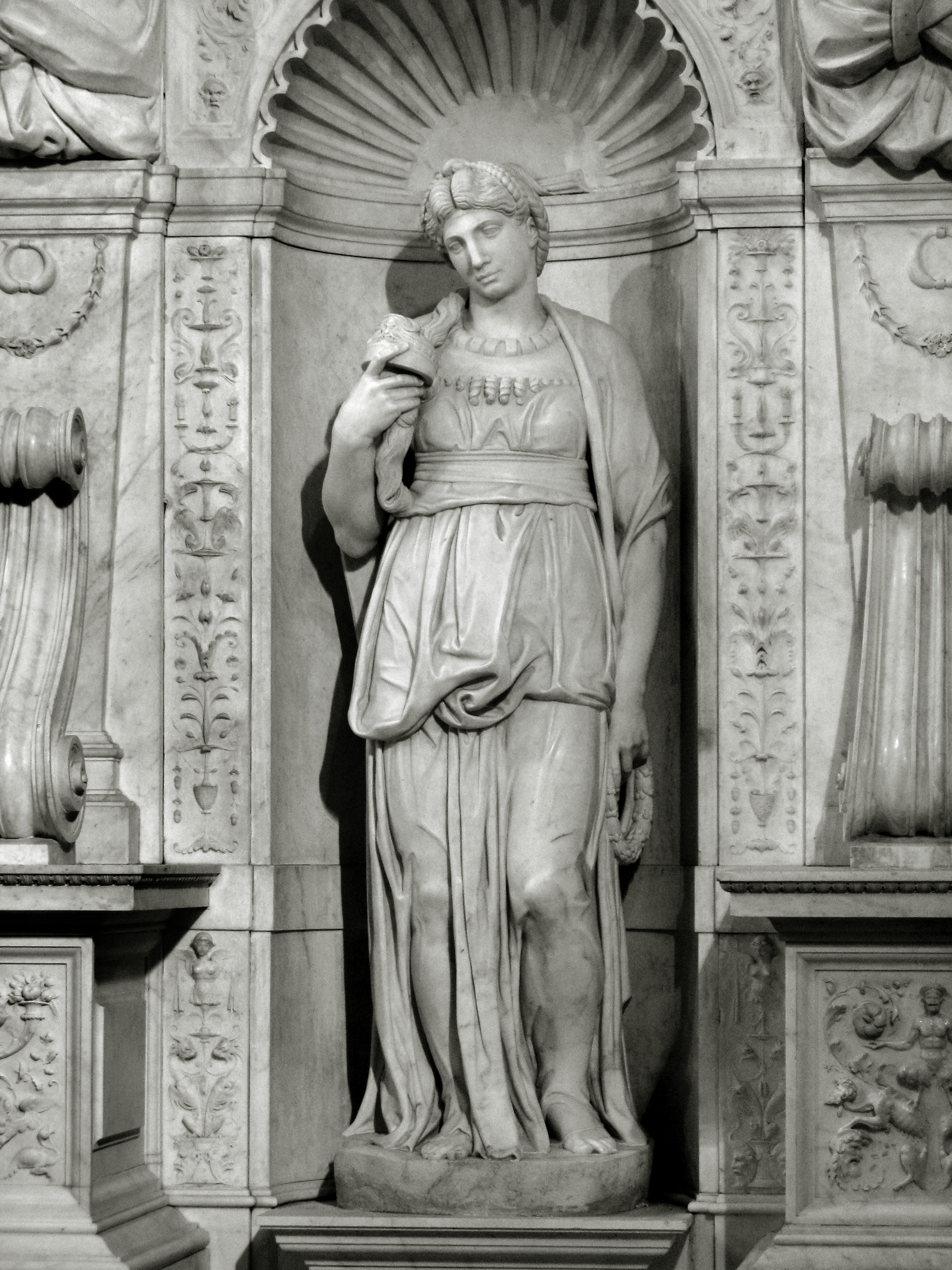
- Michelangelo's Leah at the tomb of Pope Julius II at San Pietro in Vincoli
- Born: Paddan Aram, Aram-Naharaim (present-day Harran, Turkey)
- Died: Canaan (present-day Israel)
- Spouse: Jacob
- Children: Reuben; Simeon; Levi; Judah; Issachar; Zebulun; Dinah
- Father: Laban
- Relatives: Rachel (sister)

Leah (Note: Hebrew: לֵאָה, Modern: Lēʼa, Tiberian: Lēʼā, ISO 259-3 Leˀa; Syriac: ܠܝܐ La'ya; from 𒀖 littu (Akkadian for 'cow')) (/ˈliːə/) appears in the Hebrew Bible as one of the two wives of the Israelite patriarch Jacob. She was Jacob's first wife and the elder sister of his second (and favored) wife, Rachel. Jacob was tricked into marrying Leah by her father, Laban, and subsequently married Rachel. The narrative stated that Leah was "hated" [by Jacob], or at any rate loved less than her sister.

Leah was the mother of Jacob's first son Reuben. She had three more sons, namely Simeon, Levi and Judah, but did not bear another son until Rachel offered her a night with Jacob in exchange for some mandrake root (דודאים, dûdâ'îm). Leah gave birth to two more sons after this, Issachar and Zebulun, and to Jacob's only daughter, Dinah.

== Name ==
The name Leah is associated with the Hebrew word for "fatigue" or being "worn out".

Leah may mean "cow", derived from Proto-Semitic *laˀay-at-, *layˀ-at-. Scott Noegel says there is an irony involving Laban's flocks within this detail, one is on generative acts. Herein also lies a subtle pun on Leah's name, which occurs again in Genesis 29:23. (Note: Note, however, that references to bovines and their fertility would not have been an unkind association in the ancient near East, where the cultural attitude toward cattle is reflected by the ubiquity of boviform gods) Give me my wife for my days are fulfilled, that I may go in to her (Hebrew: אליה, romanized: ëléah, lit. '(on)to her'; Gen 29:21).

== Biblical narrative ==
=== Overview ===
Leah first appears in the Book of Genesis, in Genesis 29, which describes her as the daughter of Laban and the elder sister of Rachel and says that she does not compare to Rachel's physical beauty and that she has tender eyes. (Note: "Leah had tender eyes" (Biblical Hebrew: ועיני לאה רכות) (Genesis 29:17). It is debated as to whether the adjective "tender" (רכות) should be taken to mean "delicate and soft" or "weary". Some translations say that it may have meant blue or light-colored eyes. Some say that Leah spent most of her time weeping and praying to God to change her destined mate; thus the Torah describes her eyes as "soft" from weeping. See the section #Appearance for further reading.) Earlier passages in the Book of Genesis give some background on her father's family, noting that through him, she is the niece of Rebecca, who is the wife of Isaac and the mother of Jacob and Esau, and the granddaughter of Bethuel, and rabbinic literature goes even further, with the Book of Jasher claiming Leah and Rachel were twins and recording her mother's name as Adinah and her brothers' names as Beor, Alub, and Murash. Rabbinical literature contradicts itself on whether Leah and Rachel were half-siblings to Zilpah and Bilhah, two sisters who would serve as mistresses to Leah's future husband, Jacob, and whose children she and Rachel would raise as their own, as one source lists them as being daughters of Laban, but not his wife Adinah, and another lists them as being the daughters of Rotheus, a man who was close to Laban but not related to him. If Zilpah and Bilhah were indeed half-sisters of Leah, this would make Leah's adoptive sons, Gad and Asher, and Rachel's adoptive sons, Dan and Naphtali, her nephews. According to Genesis 28:2, the family resided in Paddan Aram, an area believed to correspond with the historical Upper Mesopotamia [7].

Before Leah and Rachel enter the narrative, Genesis recounts how Jacob, aided by his mother, Rebecca, deceived his elderly father Isaac into giving him the blessing intended for his twin brother Esau. Fearing Esau’s retaliation, Jacob fled to Haran, where he met his maternal uncle Laban and Laban’s daughters. Genesis describes Rachel as beautiful, while Leah is said only to have "weary", "tired", or "tender" eyes. Jacob agreed to work for Laban for seven years in order to marry Rachel. At the end of this period, however, Laban substituted Leah for Rachel at the wedding, explaining that local custom required the elder daughter to marry first. Jacob married Rachel after completing the week-long celebration of his marriage to Leah and agreed to work another seven years for Laban. Genesis states that Jacob loved Rachel more than Leah; when God saw that Leah was unloved, he enabled her to conceive, while Rachel remained childless.

Despite Rachel's infertility, Jacob still favored Rachel over her. He also favored Rachel's sons, Joseph and Benjamin, over Leah's, and made no attempts to hide that from her or his other children. According to 1 Chronicles 5:1, Jacob took the firstborn's birthright, which entitles a firstborn to a larger inheritance in Jewish law, from Reuben, his oldest son, to Joseph, who was his second-youngest son, and, in Genesis 33:2, when he is confronted by Esau, puts Leah, along with Zilpah and Bilhah and all of their sons, in front of himself, Rachel, and Joseph, to be used as something of a buffer or a shield to protect himself in the event the confrontation turned violent.

=== Appearance ===
The Torah introduces Leah by describing her with the phrase, "Leah had tender eyes" (Biblical Hebrew: ועיני לאה רכות) (Genesis 29:17). It is argued as to whether the adjective "tender" (רכות) should be taken to mean "delicate and soft" or rather "weary" or "weak".

The commentary of Rashi cites a Rabbinic interpretation of how Leah's eyes became weak. According to this story, Leah was destined to marry Jacob's older twin brother, Esau. In the Rabbinic mind, the two brothers are polar opposites; Jacob being a God-fearing scholar and Esau being a hunter who also indulges in idolatry and adultery. But people were saying, "Laban has two daughters and his sister, Rebekah, has two sons. The older daughter (Leah) will marry the older son (Esau), and the younger daughter (Rachel) will marry the younger son (Jacob)." Hearing this, Leah spent most of her time weeping and praying to God to change her destined mate. Thus the Torah describes her eyes as "soft" from weeping. God hearkens to Leah's tears and prayers and allows her to marry Jacob even before Rachel does.

=== Marriage to Jacob ===
Leah becomes Jacob's wife through a deception on the part of her father, Laban. In the Biblical account, Jacob is dispatched to the hometown of Laban—the brother of his mother Rebekah—to avoid being killed by his brother Esau, and to find a wife. Out by the well, he encounters Laban's younger daughter Rachel tending her father's sheep, and decides to marry her. Laban is willing to give Rachel's hand to Jacob as long as he works seven years for her.

On the wedding night, however, Laban switches Leah for Rachel. Later Laban claims that it is uncustomary to give the younger daughter away in marriage before the older one (Genesis 29:16–30). Laban offers to give Rachel to Jacob in marriage in return for another seven years of work (Genesis 29:27). Jacob accepts the offer and marries Rachel after the week-long celebration of his marriage to Leah.

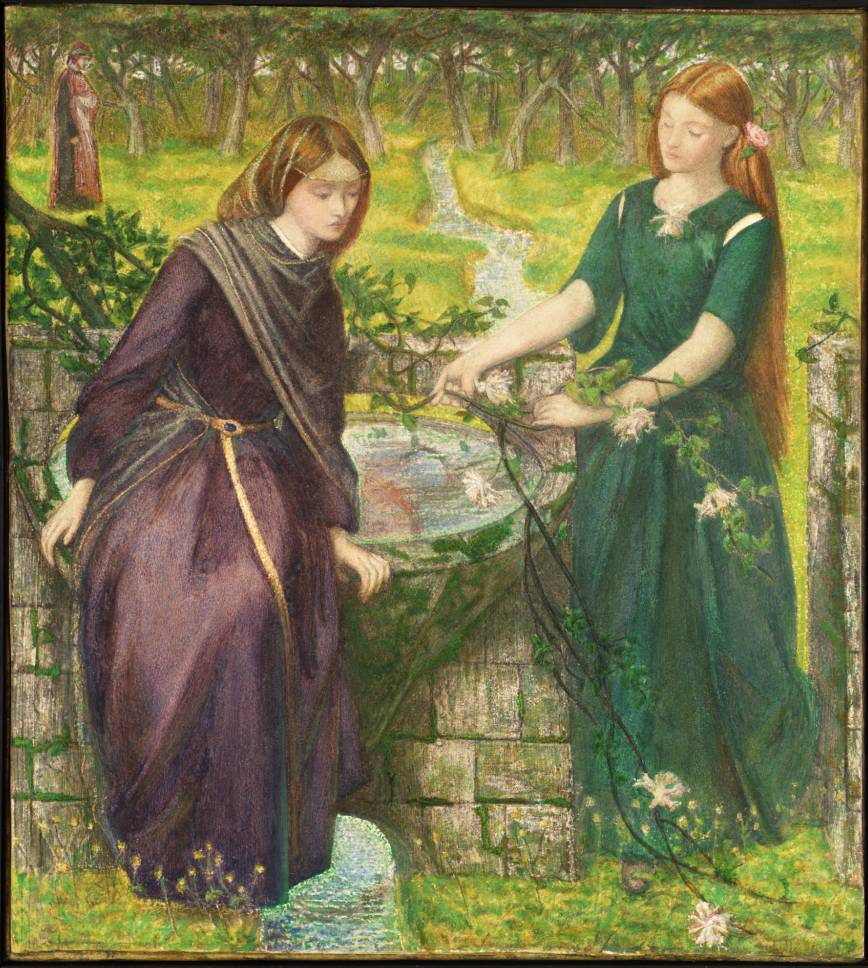
Dante's Vision of Rachel and Leah – Dante Gabriel Rossetti, 1855

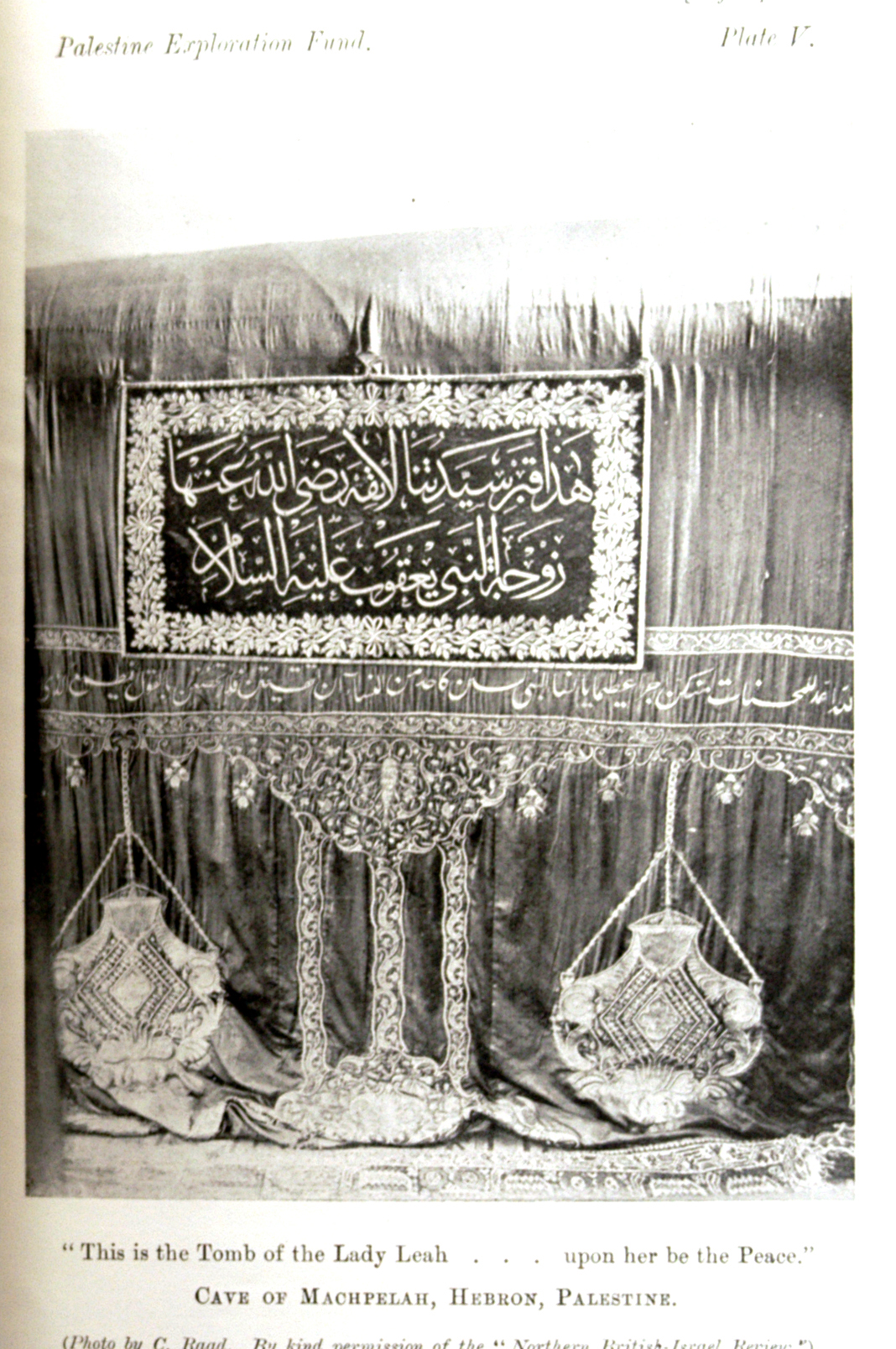
Tomb of Leah, 1911

=== Motherhood ===
Leah was the mother of six of Jacob's sons, including his first four (Reuben, Simeon, Levi, and Judah), and later two more (Issachar and Zebulun), and a daughter (Dinah). According to the scriptures, God saw that Leah was "unloved" and opened her womb as consolation. Through her sons Levi and Judah, she is thus the matriarch of both the priestly (Levite) and royal (Judahite) tribes in Israel.

Seeing that she was unable to conceive, Rachel offered her handmaid Bilhah to Jacob, and named and raised the two sons (Dan and Naphtali) that Bilhah gave birth to. Leah responded by offering her handmaid Zilpah to Jacob, and named and raised the two sons (Gad and Asher) that Zilpah gave birth to. According to some commentaries, Bilhah and Zilpah were actually half-sisters of Leah and Rachel.

One day, Leah's firstborn son Reuben returned from the field with mandrakes for his mother. Leah had not conceived for a while, and the plant, whose roots resemble the human body, was thought to be an aid to fertility. Frustrated that she was not able to conceive at all, Rachel offered to trade her night with their husband with Leah in return for the mandrakes. Leah agreed, and that night she slept with Jacob and conceived Issachar. Afterwards she gave birth to Zebulun and to a daughter, Dinah. After that, God remembered Rachel and gave her two sons, Joseph and Benjamin.

=== Departure from Paddam Aram ===
Following Joseph's birth and prompted by God's guidance (Genesis 31:3), Jacob decided to return to the land of Canaan with his family. Fearing that Laban would deter him, he fled with his two wives, Leah and Rachel, and his children, without informing his father-in-law.

=== Death and burial ===
Leah died some time before Jacob (according to Genesis 49:31). She is thought to be buried in the Cave of the Patriarchs in Hebron alongside Jacob. This cave also houses the graves of Abraham and Sarah, and Isaac and Rebekah.

== Jewish interpretation ==
On a homiletical level, the classic Chassidic texts explain the sisters' rivalry as more than marital jealousy. Each woman desired to grow spiritually in her avodat HaShem (service of God), and therefore sought closeness to the tzadik (Jacob) who is God's personal emissary in this world. By marrying Jacob and bearing his sons, who would be raised in the tzadik's home and continue his mission into the next generation (indeed, all 12 sons became tzadikim in their own right and formed the foundation of the Nation of Israel), they would develop an even closer relationship to God. Therefore, Leah and Rachel each wanted to have as many of those sons as possible, going so far as to offer their handmaids as proxies to Jacob so they could have a share in the upbringing of their handmaids' sons, too.

Each woman also continually questioned whether she was doing enough in her personal efforts toward increased spirituality, and would use the other's example to spur herself on. Rachel envied Leah's tearful prayers, by which she merited to marry the tzaddik and bear six of his twelve sons. The Talmud (Megillah 13b) says that Rachel revealed to Leah the secret signs which she and Jacob had devised to identify the veiled bride, because they both suspected Laban would pull such a trick.

== Medieval Christian symbolism ==
In medieval Christian symbolism, Rachel was taken as a symbol of the contemplative (monastic) Christian life, and Leah as a symbol of the active (non-monastic) life. Dante Alighieri's Purgatorio includes a dream of Rachel and Leah, which inspired illustrations by Dante Gabriel Rossetti and others:

"... in my dream, I seemed to see a woman
both young and fair; along a plain she gathered
flowers, and even as she sang, she said:
Whoever asks my name, know that I'm Leah,
and I apply my lovely hands to fashion
a garland of the flowers I have gathered."
