= Zebulun =

Biblical figure and son of Jacob and Leah

- זְבֻלוּן
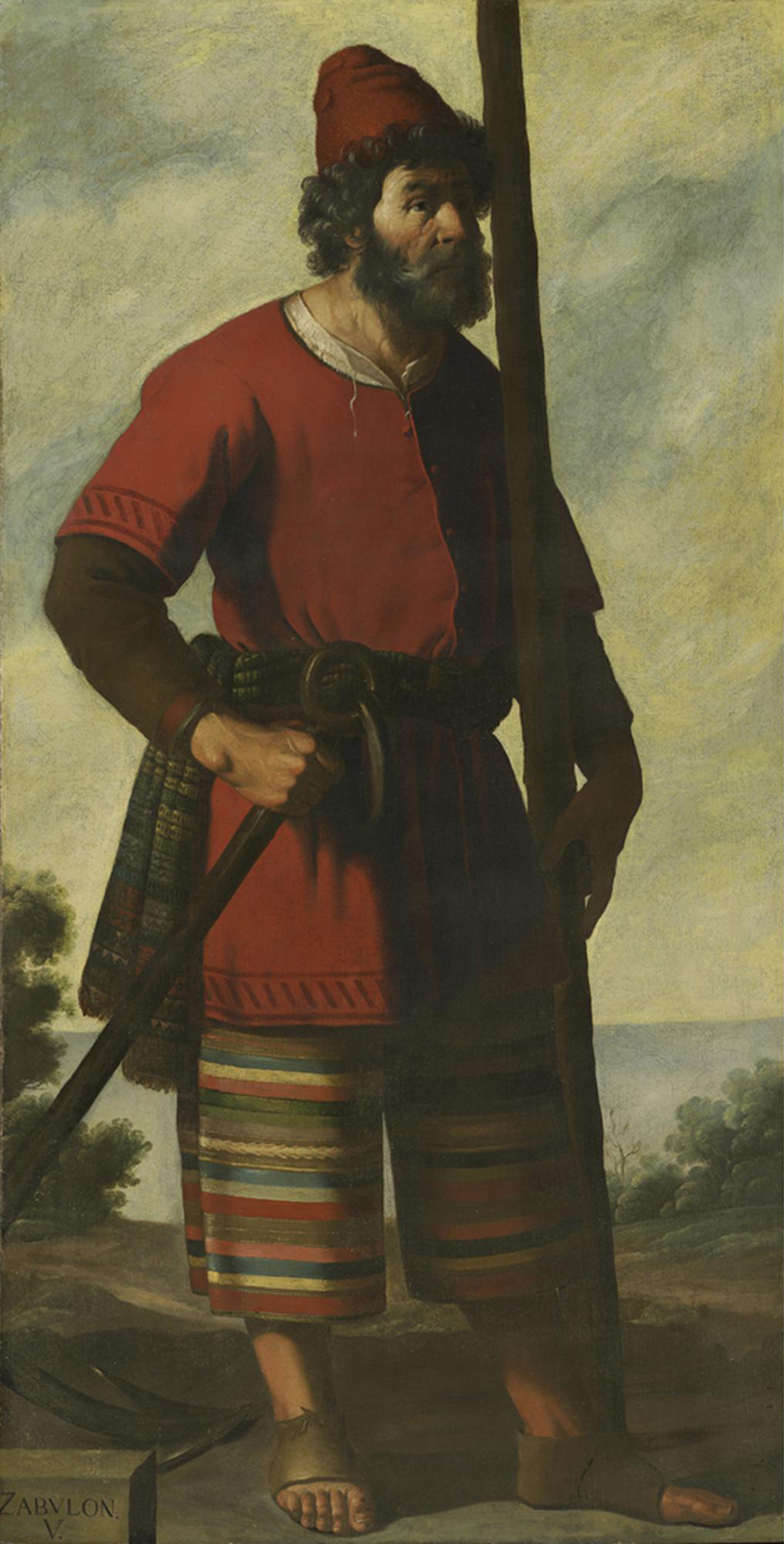
- Painting by Francisco de Zurbarán from Jacob and His Twelve Sons, c. 1640–45
- Pronunciation: Zəvulun
- Born: 7 Tishrei; Paddan Aram
- Spouse: Merishah
- Children: Sered (son); Elon (son); Jahleel (son)
- Parents: Jacob (father); Leah (mother)
- Relatives: Reuben (brother); Simeon (brother); Levi (brother); Judah (brother); Dan (half brother); Naphtali (half brother); Gad (half brother); Asher (half brother); Issachar (brother); Dinah (sister); Joseph (half brother); Benjamin (half brother); Rachel (aunt/stepmother)

Zebulun (Hebrew: זְבֻלוּן/זְבוּלֻן/זְבוּלוּן, Modern: Zəvūlūn, Tiberian: Zăḇūlūn; also Zebulon, Zabulon, or Zaboules in Antiquities of the Jews by Josephus) was, according to the Books of Genesis and Numbers, Jacob's tenth son, the last of the six sons of Jacob and Leah, and the founder of the Israelite tribe of Zebulun. With Leah as a matriarch, biblical scholars believe the tribe to have been regarded by the text's authors as a part of the original Israelite confederation.

The Tomb of Zebulun is located in Sidon, Lebanon. In the past, towards the end of Iyyar, Jews from the most distant parts of the land of Israel would make a pilgrimage to this tomb.

== Etymology ==
The name is derived from the triliteral root zbl, common in 2nd millennium BCE Ugaritic texts as an epithet (title) of the god Baal, as well as in Phoenician and (frequently) in Biblical Hebrew in personal names.

The text of the Torah gives two different etymologies for the name Zebulun, which textual scholars attribute to different sources – one to the Jahwist and the other to the Elohist; the first being that it derives from zebed, the word for gift, from Leah's view that her gaining of six sons was a gift from God; the second being that it derives from yizbeleni, meaning honour, for Leah's hope that Jacob would give her honour now that she had given birth to six sons. In Deuteronomy 33, however, an allusion is made to a third potential etymology: that it may be connected with zibhe, literally meaning sacrifice, about commercial activities of the tribe of Zebulun – a commercial agreement made at Mount Tabor between the tribe of Zebulun and a group of non-Israelites was referred to as zibhe-tzedek, literally meaning sacrifice to justice or sacrifice to Tzedek.

== Biblical account ==
The Torah states that Leah conceived again, after the birth of Issachar, whose conception was linked to an incident involving mandrakes and a deal between Rachel and Leah. At this point Leah had six sons, "a good endowment" from God. She went on to give birth to a daughter, Dinah.

Zebulun had three sons – Sered, Elon, and Jahleel. Each became the eponymous founder of a clan. They risked their lives on the battlefield with Naphtali from Judges 5's Song of Deborah and Barak: "Zebulun is a people who exposed its soul to death, Naphtali also - on high places of the field."

== Druze ==
In the Druze faith, the prophet Sabalan is often identified with Zebulun. Sabalan's Tomb is located in the village Hurfeish.
