= Naphtali =

Biblical figure, son of Jacob and his concubine Bilhah

- נַפְתָּלִי
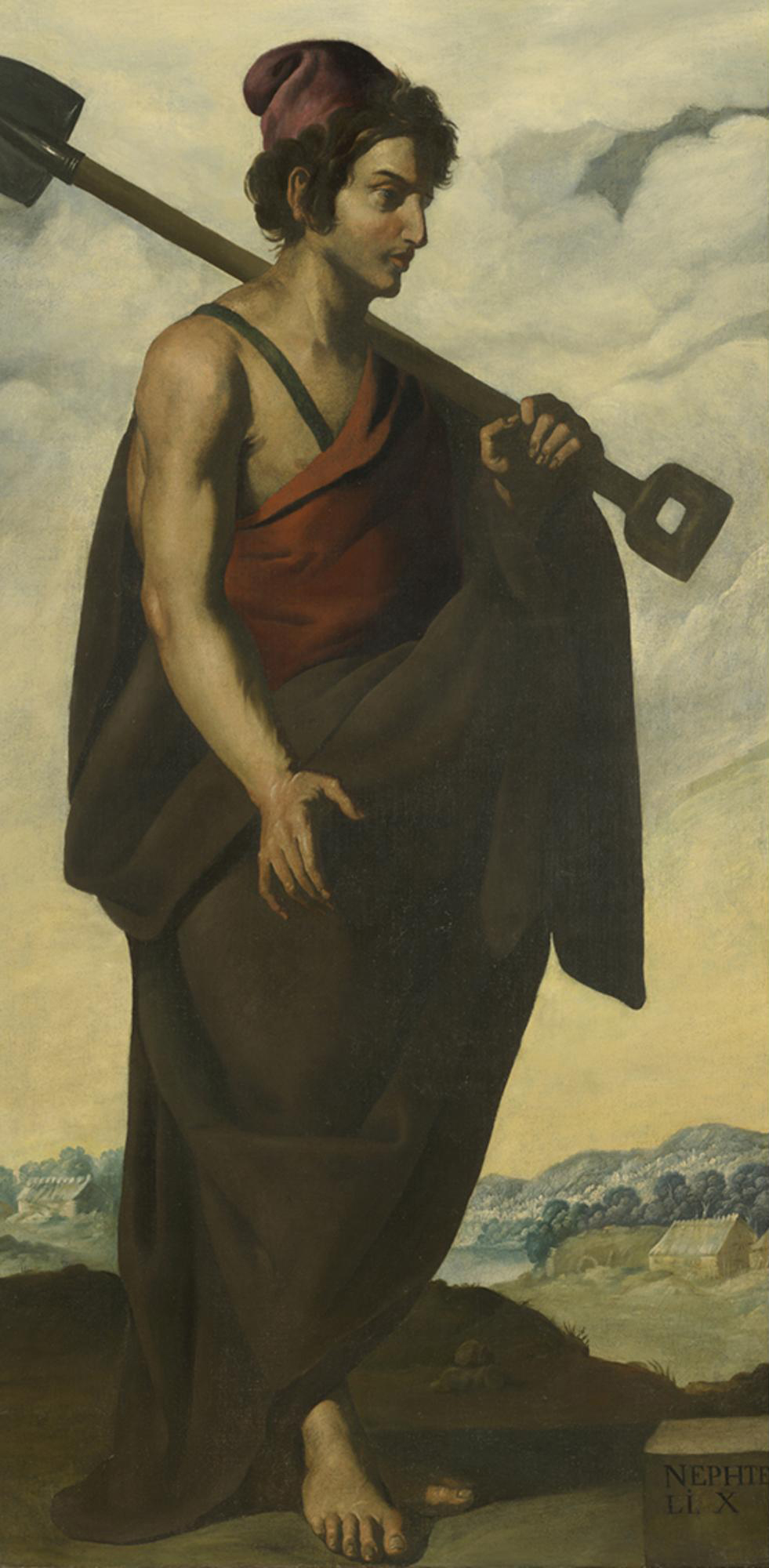
- Painting by Francisco de Zurbarán (from Jacob and his twelve sons, c. 1640–45)
- Pronunciation: /ˈnæftəlaɪ/
- Born: 5 Tishrei or 5 Sivan
- Spouse: Merimah
- Children: Jahziel (son); Guni (son); Jezer (son); Shillem (son)
- Parents: Jacob (father); Bilhah (mother)
- Relatives: Reuben (half brother); Simeon (half brother); Levi (half brother); Judah (half brother); Dan (brother); Gad (half brother); Asher (half brother); Issachar (half brother); Zebulun (half brother); Dinah (half sister); Joseph (half brother); Benjamin (half brother)

According to the Book of Genesis, Naphtali (/ˈnæftəlaɪ/; Hebrew: נַפְתָּלִי, Modern: Naftalī, Tiberian: Nap̄tālī, "my struggle") was the sixth son of Jacob, the second of his two sons born of Bilhah. He was the founder of the Israelite tribe of Naphtali.

Some biblical commentators have suggested that the name Naphtali may refer to the struggle between Rachel and Leah for the favours of Jacob. Bilhah was the handmaid of Rachel, who was infertile at the time, and had persuaded Jacob to have a child with Bilhah as a proxy for having one with herself.

== Biblical references ==
Naphtali's birth is reported in Genesis 30:1-8. Leah, Jacob's first wife, has four sons by this time, while Rachel, his second but "preferred" wife, has none and fears she may be barren. She suggests that Jacob takes her handmaid Bilhah as a concubine, and through this arrangement Bilhah gives birth to Dan and then to Naphtali, enabling Rachel to identify herself as their mother through the agency of her servant. Rachel herself names both boys. "Naphtali" reflects her saying that "with mighty wrestlings I have wrestled with my sister and have prevailed".

Naphtali is listed in Deuteronomy 34:2, when God takes Moses up to Mount Nebo and shows him the extent of the land that He had promised to Abraham, Isaac, and Jacob. See article on Tribe of Simeon for a map of the twelve tribes of Israel.

According to Genesis 46:24, Naphtali had four sons: Jahzeel, Guni, Jezer, and Shillem. The name of his wife/wives are not given. He and his family migrated to Egypt, with the rest of the clan, where they remained until the Exodus.

== Other writings ==
According to the Targum Pseudo-Jonathan, Naphtali was a swift runner, though this appears to have been inferred from the Blessing of Jacob, which equates Naphtali to a red deer. However, Biblical scholars believe this to be a description of the tribe of Naphtali.

In the Book of Jubilees 44:30, a son of Naphtali is listed as 'Iv. This child does not show up in Genesis and is not referenced beyond that single chapter, where one verse after, it says 'Iv died in Egypt.

=== Testament of Naphtali ===
In this apocryphal material, Naphtali gave his sons no commandment except regarding the fear of God, that they should serve Him and follow after Him, also admonished them not to join themselves unto the sons of Joseph but join the sons of Levi and Judah. He also had a vision about the division of tribes of Israel and told to them that Abraham was chosen by God for his faith. According to the apocryphal Testament of the Twelve Patriarchs, Naphtali died at age 137 and was buried in Egypt.
