= Benjamin =

Biblical figure and son of Jacob and Rachel

- בִּנְיָמִין
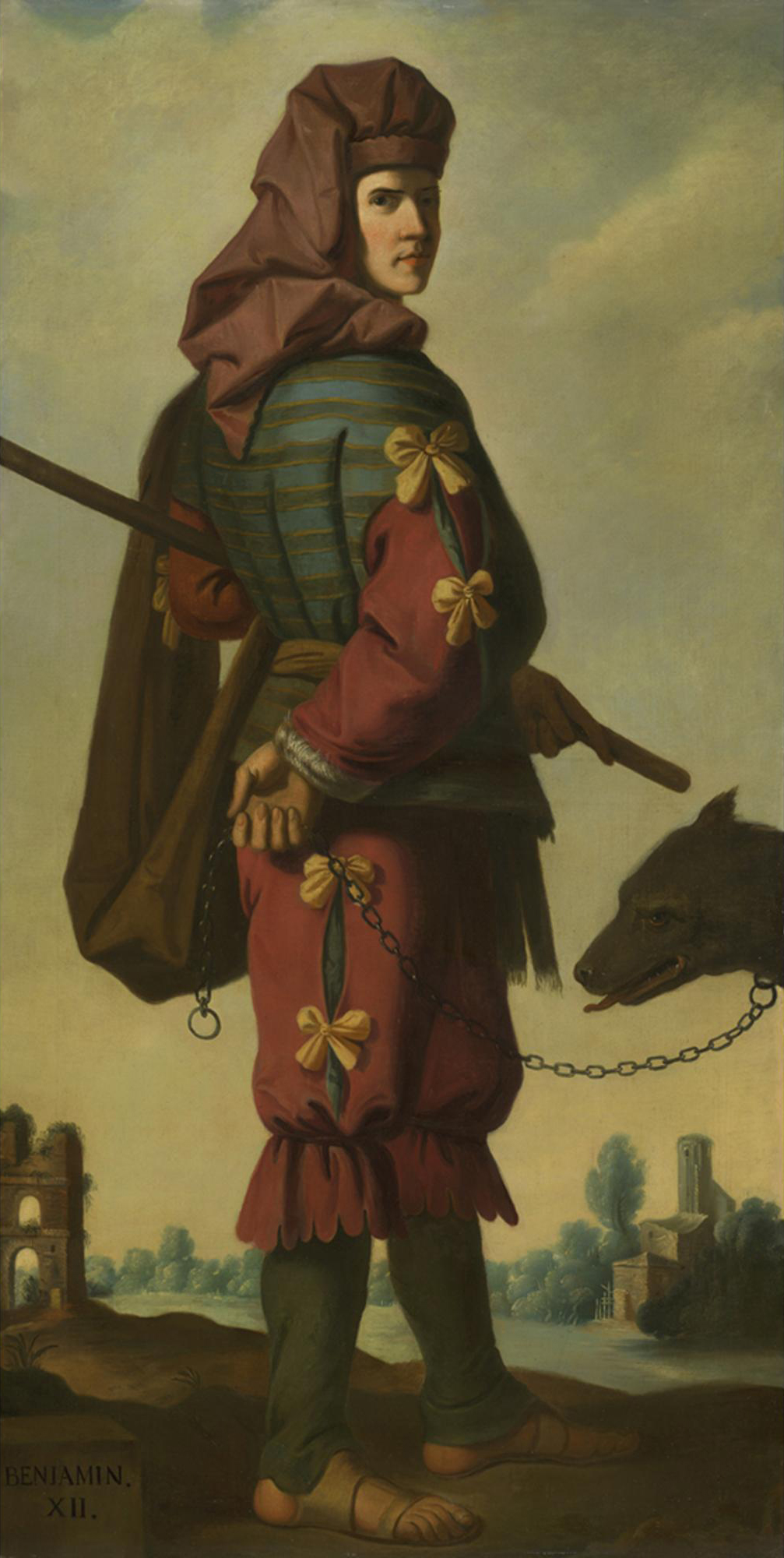
- Painting by Arthur Pond (1745) after Francisco de Zurbarán's portrait from the series (Jacob and His Twelve Sons) c. 1640 – c. 1645
- Born: 11 Cheshvan
- Children: Bela (son); Beker (son); Ashbel (son); Gera (son); Naaman (son); Ehi (son); Rosh (son); Muppim (son); Huppim (son); Ard (son)
- Parents: Jacob (father); Rachel (mother)
- Relatives: Reuben (half brother); Simeon (half brother); Levi (half brother); Judah (half brother); Dan (half brother); Naphtali (half brother); Gad (half brother); Asher (half brother); Issachar (half brother); Zebulun (half brother); Dinah (half sister); Joseph (brother); Leah (aunt/stepmother)

Benjamin (Hebrew: בִּנְיָמִין, Bīnyāmīn 'Son of (the) right') was the younger of the two sons of Jacob and Rachel, and Jacob's twelfth and youngest son overall in Jewish, Christian and Islamic tradition. He was also considered the progenitor of the Israelite Tribe of Benjamin. Unlike Rachel's first son, Joseph, Benjamin was born in Canaan according to biblical narrative.

In the Samaritan Pentateuch, Benjamin's name appears as "Binyamēm" (Samaritan Hebrew: ࠁࠪࠍࠬࠉࠣࠌࠜࠉࠌࠬ 'son of days'). In the Quran, Benjamin is referred to as a righteous young child, who remained with Jacob when the older brothers plotted against Joseph. Later rabbinic traditions name him as one of four ancient Israelites who died without sin, the other three being Chileab, Jesse and Amram.

== Name ==
The name is first mentioned in letters from King Sîn-kāšid of Uruk (1801–1771 BC), who called himself “King of Amnanum” and was a member of the Amorite tribal group the “Binu-Jamina” (single name “Binjamin”; Akkadian Mar-Jamin). This name means "Sons/Son of the South" and is linguistically related to the Old Testament name "Benjamin".

According to the Hebrew Bible, Benjamin's name arose when Jacob deliberately changed the name "Benoni", the original name of Benjamin, since Benoni was an allusion to Rachel's dying just after she had given birth, as it means "son of my pain". Textual scholars regard these two names as fragments of naming narratives coming from different sources - one being the Jahwist and the other being the Elohist.

Unusual for one of the 12 tribes of Israel, the Bible does not explain the etymology of Benjamin's name. Medieval commentator Rashi gives two different explanations, based on Midrashic sources. "Son of the south", with south derived from the word for the right hand side, referring to the birth of Benjamin in Canaan, as compared with the birth of all the other sons of Jacob in Aram. Modern scholars have proposed that "son of the south" / "right" is a reference to the tribe being subordinate to the more dominant tribe of Ephraim. Alternatively, Rashi suggests it means "son of days", meaning a son born in Jacob's old age. The Samaritan Pentateuch consistently spells his name "בנימים", with a terminal mem, ("Binyamim"), which could be translated literally as "spirit man" but is in line with the interpretation that the name was a reference to the advanced age of Jacob when Benjamin was born.

According to classical rabbinical sources, Benjamin was only born after Rachel had fasted for a long time, as a religious devotion with the hope of a new child as a reward. By then Jacob had become over 100 years old. Benjamin is treated as a young child in most of the Biblical narrative, but at one point is abruptly described as the father of ten sons. Textual scholars believe that this is the result of the genealogical passage, in which his children are named, being from a much later source than the Jahwist and Elohist narratives, which make up most of the Joseph narrative, and which consistently describe Benjamin as a child.

By allusion to the biblical Benjamin, in French, Polish and Spanish, "Benjamin" (benjamin/ beniamin /benjamín, respectively) is a common noun meaning the youngest child of a family, especially a particularly favoured one (with a similar connotation to "baby of the family").

== Israelites in Egypt ==
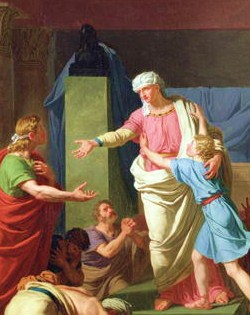
Benjamin (right) embracing his brother Joseph

The Torah's Joseph narrative, at a stage when Joseph is unrecognised by his brothers, describes Joseph as testing whether his brothers have reformed by secretly planting a silver cup in Benjamin's bag. Then, publicly searching the bags for it, and after finding it in Benjamin's possession, demanding that Benjamin become his slave as a punishment.

The narrative goes on to state that when Judah (on behalf of the other brothers) begged Joseph not to enslave Benjamin and instead enslave him, since enslavement of Benjamin would break Jacob's heart. This caused Joseph to recant and reveal his identity. The midrashic book of Jasher argues that prior to revealing his identity, Joseph asked Benjamin to find his missing brother (i.e. Joseph) via astrology, using an astrolabe-like tool. It continues by stating that Benjamin divined that the man on the throne was Joseph, so Joseph identified himself to Benjamin (but not the other brothers), and revealed his scheme (as in the Torah) to test how fraternal the other brothers were.

Some classical rabbinical sources argue that Joseph identified himself for other reasons. In these sources, Benjamin swore an oath, on the memory of Joseph, that he was innocent of theft, and, when challenged about how believable the oath would be, explained that remembering Joseph was so important to him that he had named his sons in Joseph's honour. These sources go on to state that Benjamin's oath touched Joseph so deeply that Joseph was no longer able to pretend to be a stranger.

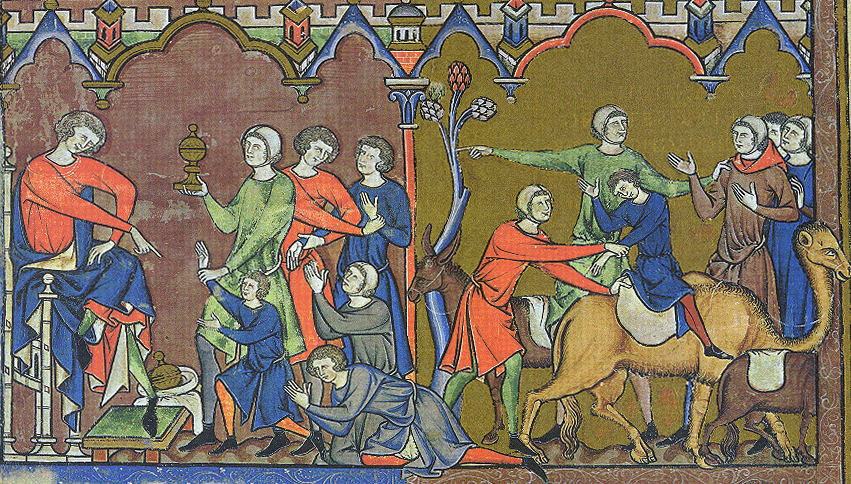
An illustration from the Morgan Bible of Benjamin being returned to Egypt (Genesis 44)

In the narrative, just prior to this test, when Joseph had first met all of his brothers (but not identified himself to them), he had held a feast for them; the narrative heavily implies that Benjamin was Joseph's favorite brother, since he is overcome with tears when he first meets Benjamin in particular, and he gives Benjamin five times as much food as he apportions to the others. According to textual scholars, this is really the Jahwist's account of the reunion after Joseph identifies himself, and the account of the threat to enslave Benjamin is just the Elohist's version of the same event, with the Elohist being more terse about Joseph's emotions towards Benjamin, merely mentioning that Benjamin was given five times as many gifts as the others.

Modern scholars often view these narrative variations as evidence of distinct source traditions that emphasize Benjamin's symbolic and theological significance within the broader Joseph cycle.

== Jacob's blessing ==
Upon his death, the patriarch Jacob blesses his youngest son: "Benjamin is a ravenous wolf; In the morning he consumes the foe, And in the evening he divides the spoil" (Genesis 49:27). This wolf symbolism has been interpreted to refer to several elements of the Tribe of Benjamin, including its heroic members like King Saul and Mordecai, the tribe's often warlike nature, and the tribe's jurisdiction over the Temple in Jerusalem in which sacrifices were 'devoured' by flame.

== Origin ==
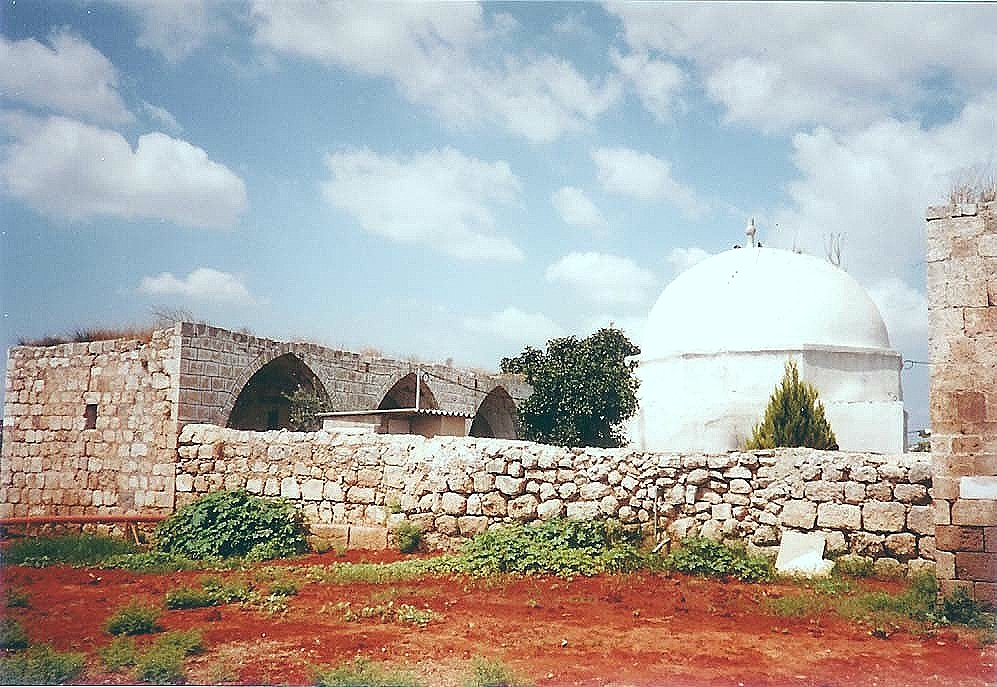
An exterior view of a Mamluk caravanserai complex, including the mausoleum of Nabi Yamin, traditionally believed to be the tomb of Benjamin, located outside Kfar Saba, Israel

Biblical scholars believe, due to their geographic overlap and their treatment in older passages, that Ephraim and Manasseh were originally considered one tribe, that of Joseph. According to several biblical scholars, Benjamin was also originally part of this single tribe, but the biblical account of Joseph as his father became lost.

The description of Benjamin being born after the arrival in Canaan is thought by some scholars to refer to the tribe of Benjamin coming into existence by branching from the Joseph group after the tribe had settled in Canaan. A number of biblical scholars suspect that the distinction of the Joseph tribes (including Benjamin) is that they were the only Israelites which went to Egypt and returned, while the main Israelite tribes simply emerged as a subculture from the Canaanites and had remained in Canaan throughout.

According to this view, the story of Jacob's visit to Laban to obtain a wife originated as a metaphor for this migration, with the property and family which were gained from Laban representing the gains of the Joseph tribes by the time they returned from Egypt. According to textual scholars, the Jahwist version of the Laban narrative only mentions the Joseph tribes and Rachel, and does not mention the other tribal matriarchs whatsoever.

== Benjamin's sons ==
According to Genesis 46:21, Benjamin had ten sons: Bela, Becher, Ashbel, Gera, Naaman, Ehi, Rosh, Muppim, Huppim, and Ard. The name of his wife/wives are not given, but the Book of Jubilees calls his wife Ijasaka and the Book of Jasher mentions two wives, Mechalia the daughter of Aram and Aribath the daughter of Shomron. The classical rabbinical tradition adds that each son's name honors Joseph:

- Belah (meaning swallow), in reference to Joseph disappearing (being swallowed up)
- Becher (meaning first born), in reference to Joseph being the first child of Rachel
- Ashbel (meaning capture), in reference to Joseph having suffered captivity
- Gera (meaning grain), in reference to Joseph living in a foreign land (Egypt)
- Naaman (meaning grace), in reference to Joseph having graceful speech
- Ehi (meaning my brother), in reference to Joseph being Benjamin's only full-brother (as opposed to half-brothers)
- Rosh (meaning elder), in reference to Joseph being older than Benjamin
- Muppim (meaning double mouth), in reference to Joseph passing on what he had been taught by Jacob
- Huppim (meaning marriage canopies), in reference to Joseph being married in Egypt, while Benjamin was not there
- Ard (meaning wanderer/fugitive), in reference to Joseph being like a rose

There is a disparity between the list given in Genesis 46 and that in Numbers 26, where the sons of Benjamin are listed along with the tribes they are the progenitors of.

- Belah, progenitor of the Belaites, is in both lists
- Ashbel, progenitor of the Ashbelites, is in both lists
- Ahiram, progenitor of the Ahiramites, appears in this list but not the first
- Shupham, progenitor of the Shuphamites, corresponds to Muppim from the first list
- Hupham, progenitor of the Huphamites, corresponds to Huppim from the first list

Becher, Gera, Ehi, and Rosh are omitted from the second list. Ard and Naaman, who are the sons of Benjamin according to Numbers 26, are listed as the sons of Belah and are the progenitors of the Ardites and the Naamites respectively.

== In Islam ==
Though not named in the Quran, Benjamin (بنيامين Binyāmīn) is referred to as the righteous youngest son of Jacob, in the narrative of Joseph in Islamic tradition. Apart from that, however, Islamic tradition does not provide much detail regarding Benjamin's life, and refers to him as being born from Jacob's wife Rachel. As with Jewish tradition, it also further links a connection between the names of Benjamin's children and Joseph.

Near Jenin, in Al-Yamun, there is a tomb-shrine known as the "Maqam of Nabi Yamin" or "A-Nabi Binyamin," which is traditionally believed by locals to be the burial site of Benjamin.

== See also ==
- Benjamin (disambiguation)
  - For a list of persons with the given name Benjamin see
- Tribe of Benjamin
- Paul the Apostle, of the Tribe of Benjamin
- Mordecai the Jew, from the Tribe of Benjamin see Esther 2:5
- Esther, also known as Hadassah, the cousin of Mordecai the Jew—see the Book of Esther
- Prophet Joseph (TV series)
