= Itapejara d'Oeste =

Coordinates: 25.965°S 52.8158°W

- Municipality
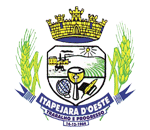
- Flag Coat of arms
- Interactive map of Itapejara d'Oeste
- Country: Brazil
- Region: Southern
- State: Paraná
- Mesoregion: Sudoeste Paranaense

Population (2020)
  - Total: 12,094
- Time zone: UTC−3 (BRT)

Itapejara d'Oeste is a municipality in the state of Paraná in the Southern Region of Brazil.

== See also ==
- List of municipalities in Paraná
