= Reuben (son of Jacob) =

Biblical figure and son of Jacob and Leah

Reuben רְאוּבֵן
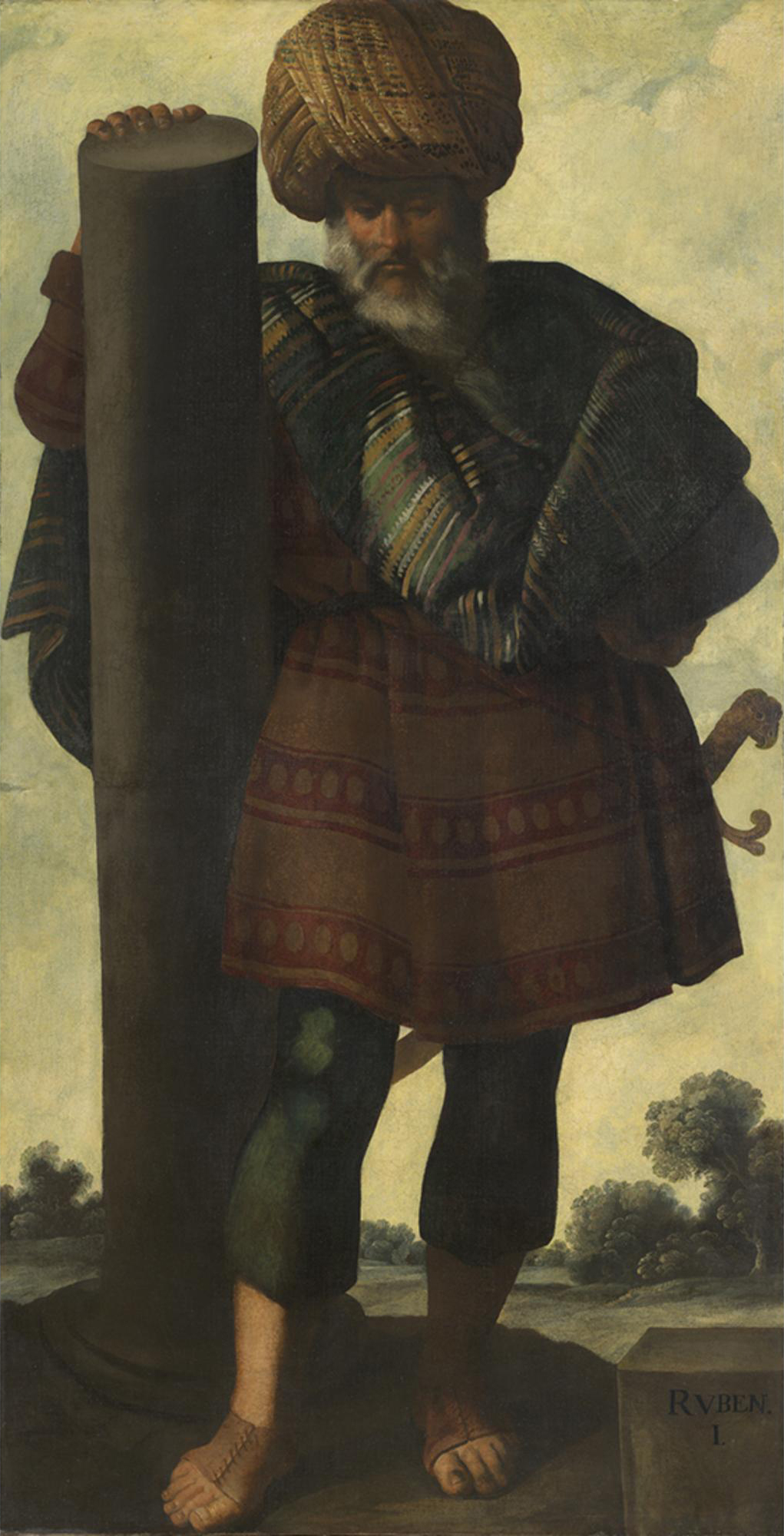
- Pronunciation: Rəʾuven
- Born: 1568 BC (14 Kislev, AM 2192 or AM 2193); Paddan Aram
- Died: 1445 BC or 1444 BC (AM 2317 or AM 2318) (aged 125)
- Resting place: Tomb of Reuben, Israel; 31°55′46″N 34°44′02″E
- Spouse: Eliuram
- Children: Hanok (son); Pallu (son); Hezron (son); Karmi (son)
- Parents: Jacob (father); Leah (mother)
- Relatives: Simeon (brother); Levi (brother); Judah (brother); Dan (half brother); Naphtali (half brother); Gad (half brother); Asher (half brother); Issachar (brother); Zebulun (brother); Dinah (sister); Joseph (half brother); Benjamin (half brother); Rachel (aunt/stepmother)

Reuben or Reuven (Hebrew: רְאוּבֵן, Standard Rəʾūven, Tiberian Rŭʾūḇēn) was the first of the six sons of Jacob and Leah, according to the Book of Genesis. He was a disappointment to Jacob and lost the pre-eminent position which should have been his as Jacob's firstborn. He was the founder of the Israelite Tribe of Reuben.

== Etymology ==
The text of the Torah gives two different etymologies for the name of Reuben, which textual scholars attribute to various sources: one to the Yahwist and the other to the Elohist:

- the first explanation states that the name refers to Yahweh having witnessed Leah's misery, concerning her status as the less-favourite of Jacob's wives, implying that the etymology of Reuben derives from Hebrew: רָאָה בְּעָנְיִי, lit. 'He looked in my eyes';
- the second explanation is that the name refers to Leah's hope that Reuben's birth will make Jacob love her, and thus his name means "He will love me".

Another Hebrew phrase to which Reuben is particularly close is "Behold, a son!", which is how classical rabbinical literature interpreted it. Some of these sources argue that Leah used the term to make an implied distinction between Reuben and Esau, his uncle. Some scholars suspect that the final consonant may originally have been an l similar to an n in the Paleo-Hebrew alphabet, and Josephus rendered the name as Reubel; it is thus possible that Reuben's name is cognate with an Arabic term meaning "wolf" or "lion". (Note: Arabic: رِئْبال)

== Biblical references ==
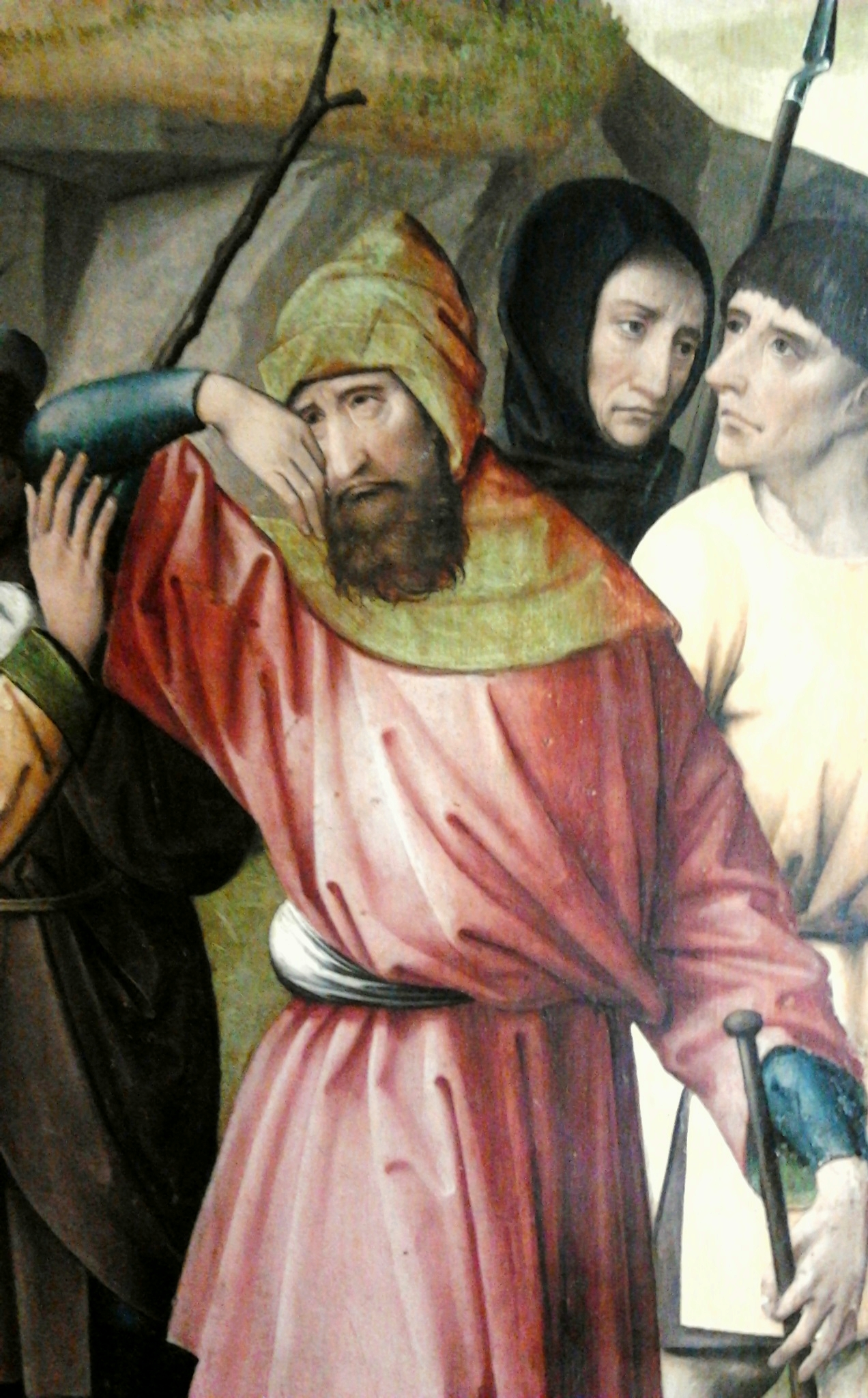
Reuben and his brothers by Colijn de Coter, ca. 1500, fragment of a painting in the National Museum in Warsaw

Reuben's birth is recorded in Genesis 29:32.

He found mandrakes in Genesis 30:14, which were instrumental in determining that Leah could lie with Jacob, leading to the birth of his brother Issachar. Later in the Book of Genesis, Reuben is briefly described as having had sexual activity with Bilhah, his stepmother's maid and father's concubine, and the narrative states that Jacob was made aware of the incident.

Reuben plays an integral part in the story leading up to his half-brother Joseph being sold to Midianite traders in Genesis 37, being the one who suggests that Joseph be dropped into a pit or cistern, (Note: Some translations refer to a dry or empty well.) but not killed. The text explains that Reuben's intention was to rescue Joseph and "restore him to his father". Reuben appears not to have been with his brothers when Joseph was sold: Genesis 37:29 reports that he "returned to the pit" and was distressed to see that Joseph was no longer there.

On his deathbed, Jacob declares that Reuben "will no longer excel, for you went up onto your father's bed, onto my couch and defiled it". Reuben's behaviour angered Jacob to the extent that he gave Reuben's birthright (as firstborn) to Joseph: a comment within 1 Chronicles 5:1 makes the same point.

Genealogies in Genesis 35:23 and 46:9 refer to Reuben. According to the latter, Reuben had four sons: Hanoch, Phallu, Hezron, and Carmi.

According to Joshua 15:6, a stone of Bohan, the son of Reuben marked a point along the boundary of the land allocated to the tribe of Judah.

== Interpretation ==
Classical rabbinical sources argue that the birthright had included the right of his descendants, the tribe of Reuben, to become ruler over the tribes and the priests, a right transferred to the Tribe of Judah and the Levites, respectively. However, some of these sources argue that Reuben had not had sexual activity with Bilhah but instead had simply supported the cause of his mother, Leah, by harming of Bilhah, angering Jacob; in these sources, it is argued that after the death of Rachel, Jacob's favourite wife, Jacob sought to give the precedence to Bilhah, as he had formerly preferred her as his mistress. Reuben removed Bilhah's bed from where Jacob wished to have it. The classical rabbinical texts argue that Reuben immediately showed contrition for his actions regarding Bilhah and thus was the "first penitent" initially, according to these sources, Reuben practiced penitence by secretly meditating, and also by abstaining from meat and wine, but when Judah confessed to the matter of Tamar, Reuben admitted what he had done, lest his other brothers might be suspected of his deed and punished for it. The classical sources go on to state that in honour of this voluntary penance and confession, God gave the tribe of Reuben Hosea as a member, and Reuben was given a reward in the future world.

Although part of the plot against Joseph, it is Reuben who persuades the others not to kill Joseph, aiming to rescue him instead. Reuben later concludes that the trouble the brothers run into in Egypt was divine punishment for the plot. Josephus speaks of Reuben reading his brothers' intentions, the "horrid nature" of what they planned being an affront to God and man. In Josephus' account, Reuben pleaded with his brothers to see the evil in what they were planning to do.

In classical rabbinical literature, Reuben is described as being motivated by a sense of responsibility over his brothers (since he was the eldest), and as having become angry when he discovers that Joseph had gone missing as a result of his brothers selling him to Ishmaelites, (Note: Textual scholars attribute this version of the narrative to the Yahwist.) or of Joseph being found and taken by Midianites. (Note: Textual scholars attribute this version of the narrative to the Elohist.) The rabbinical sources argue that the first Cities of Refuge were located in the territory of the tribe of Reuben because their eponym had tried to save Joseph from the mob of his brothers.

Classical rabbinical sources argue that Reuben was born on 14 Kislev, and died at the age of 125. The Sefer haYashar argues that when he died, Reuben's body was placed in a coffin and was later taken back to Israel, where it was buried.

== Tomb ==
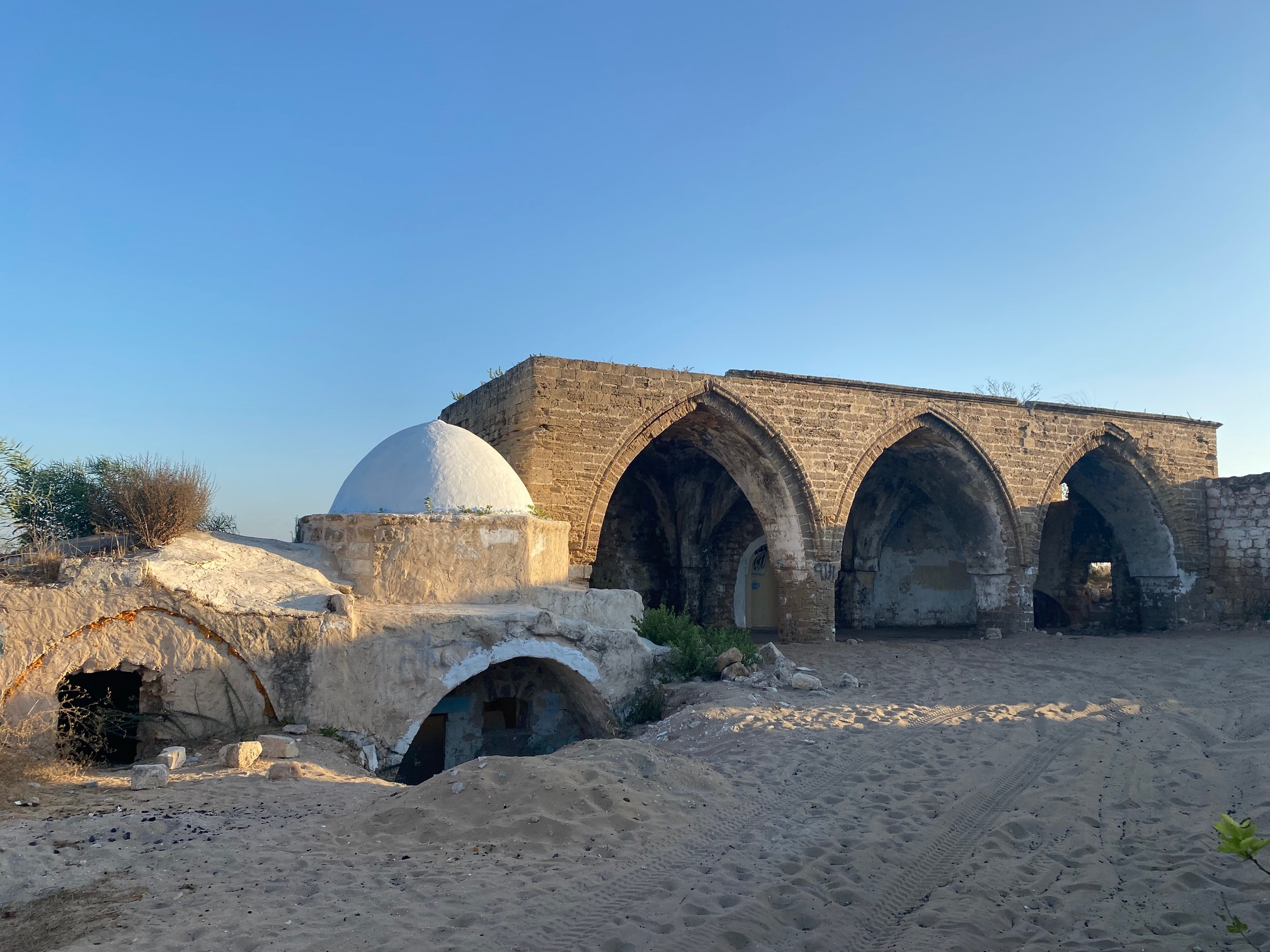
Reuben's tomb in the ruins of the ancient Arab village of Nabi Rubin, now in the Palmachim National Park, Israel

There is a tradition that Reuben was buried at a shrine in the former village of Nabi Rubin; the site was a place of pilgrimage and an annual festival before the Israeli Declaration of Independence in 1948. The ruins of the shrine containing the Tomb of Reuben and those of an adjacent mosque, nowadays abandoned, are today part of Palmachim Beach, a national park of Israel.

== See also ==
- Tribe of Reuben
