= Zimri (prince) =

Biblical figure

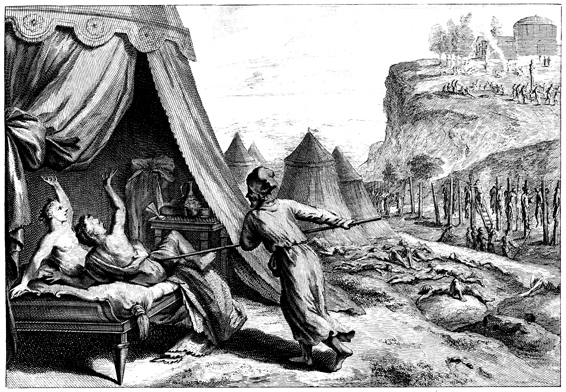
Zimri and Kozbi portrayed as having sex in a regular tent when Phinehas kills them (1700). (Note: In this interpretation of Numbers 25, Phinehas killed the Israelite man Zimri and the Midianite princess Kozbi (verse 7–8) as they were having sex in an ordinary tent in the Israelite military camp (verse 6) at Shittim near Mount Peor (verses 1–3). Outside the tents, people lay dead; apparently these are Israelites struck by the plague (verses 8–9). On the edge of the camp, soldiers stand on guard. Just outside the camp, a number of people are impaled (verse 4–5): the chiefs of the Israelite men, who engaged in sexual immorality with Moabite women and worshipped their gods (verse 1–3); this last act appears to be shown in the far background, with people on a mountain gathering around a pole, perhaps a Moabite godly idol. Engraving from Historie des Ouden en Nieuwen Testaments : verrykt met meer dan vierhonderd printverbeeldingen in koper gesneeden) ("History of the Old and New Testaments: enriched with more than four hundred printed illustrations cut in copper") (1700), published by David Martin in Amsterdam.)

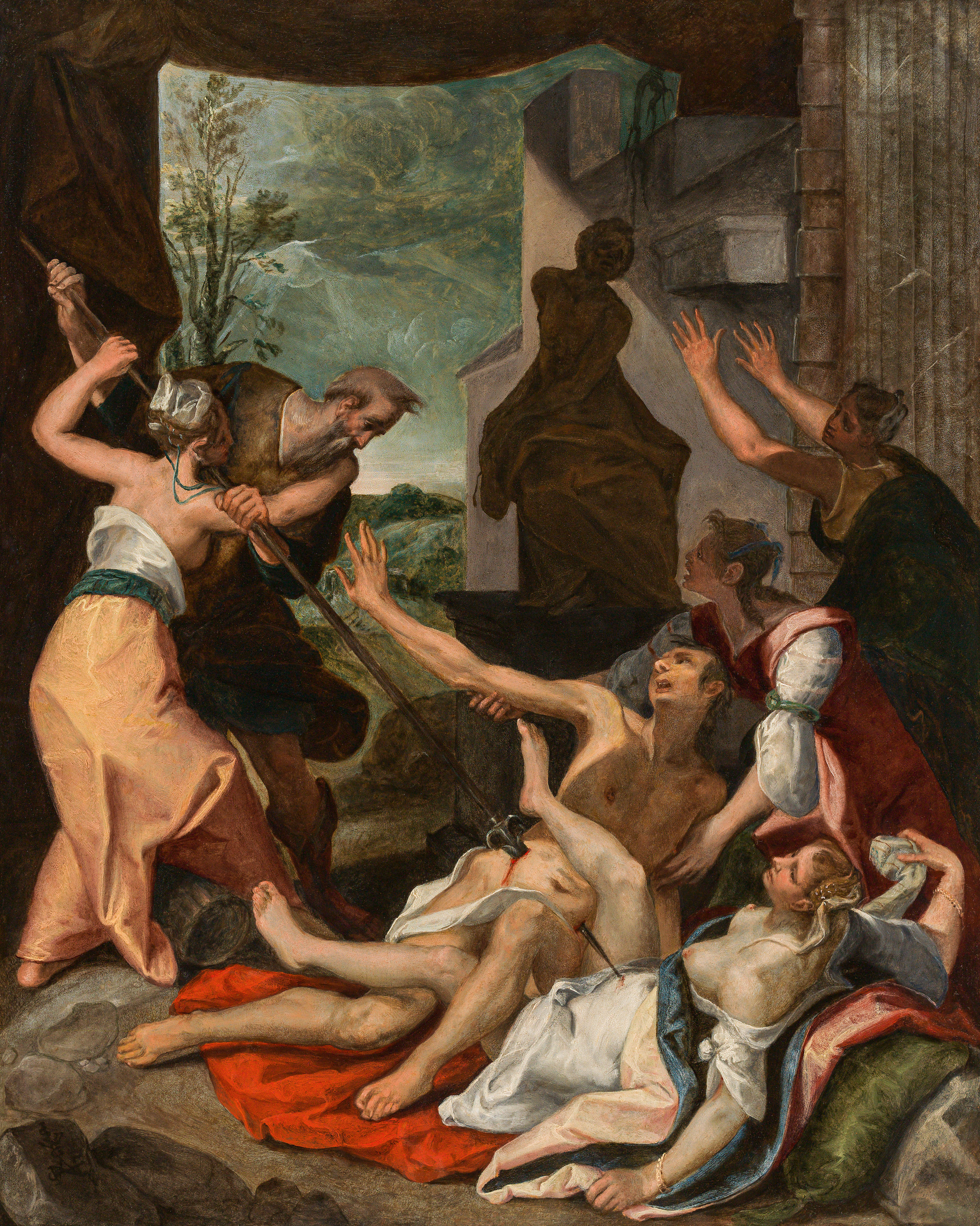
Painting by Jeremias van Winghe of Phinehas slaying Zimri and Kozbi

Zimri (Hebrew: זִמְרִי, Zīmrī; lit. 'praiseworthy') son of Salu was the prince or leader of a family within the Tribe of Simeon during the time of the Israelites’ Exodus in the wilderness at the time when they were approaching the Promised Land. The Book of Numbers in the Hebrew Bible describes how, at Abila or Shittim, he took part in the Heresy of Peor, taking as a paramour a Midianite woman, Cozbi (or Kozbi). For this sin, Phinehas, grandson of Aaron, killed them both by impaling them on a spear as they had sex (Numbers 25:6–15).

The incident was then taken by the Israelites as a pretext for the War against the Midianites in Numbers 31.

== Interpretations ==
=== Judaism ===
Since many of the sinners were from the tribe of Shimon, the tribesmen came to Zimri, who was one of the leaders of the tribe, and demanded that he do something that would save them. Zimri decided that prostitution with a non-Jew was not punishable by death, and cited evidence of Moses' marriage with Jethro's daughter, even though she had converted to Judaism before her marriage with him. In order to substantiate this ruling, he decided to prostitute with Cozbi, the daughter of Zur, the king of Midian, and to publicize this deed. He came to her and asked her to cooperate with him. She told him that since she was the daughter of a king and exalted from a nation, her father would not allow her to prostitute with anyone, but only with the greatest of the people of Israel, Moses. Zimri told her that he was more important than Moses, since Moses was the leader of the third tribe, the Tribe of Levi, while he himself was the leader of the Tribe of Shimon, the second tribe. Cozbi agreed to cooperate, and Zimri grabbed her in Belorita and brought her to Moshe, where he defied him and asked if Cozbi was allowed to do so, since she was just like Moshe's wife, Tzipora, who was also a Midianite. When the people saw Zimri's act of provocation, they all wept. The Babylonian Talmud asserts that Zimri and Cozbi engaged in 424 acts of coitus in their public encounter before Phinehas zealously killed them. The meaning of that exact number of coituses in their multi-coital encounter and whether or not that figure was meant to be taken literally has been debated by scholars.

According to a midrash (Tanhuma Pinhas 2.1; Sanhedrin 82b), Zimri was the same person as Shelumiel son of Zurishaddai.

=== Islam ===
In Islam, Zimri appears under the name as-Sāmirī (الـسّٰامِرِي). Islam also assigns to him a major role in the earlier affair of the Golden Calf, which is not attested in the Bible, although this is only one of several theories for the man’s identity. The Islamic account attributes to Zimri/Samiri many of the actions which the Hebrew Bible assigns to Aaron - thus exonerating the latter, Islam's prophet Harun, from involvement in the sinful worship of the Calf.

=== Christianity ===
According to the Revelations of Saint Bridget, after his death, Zimri's soul was condemned to hell (Book 7, Chapter 19).

== Later influence ==
In the deutero-canonical First Book of Maccabees, the zeal of Mattathias, leader of the Maccabean revolt, is said to be inspired by the zeal shown by Phinehas:

Thus he showed his zeal for the law, just as Phinehas did with Zimri, son of Salu. Then Mattathias cried out in the city, "Let everyone who is zealous for the law and who stands by the covenant follow me!"

The Phineas Priests, a modern-day U.S. terrorist movement, believe the story of Phinehas and Zimri provides a divine mandate for committing atrocities against mixed-race couples.
