= Asher =

Biblical figure and son of Jacob and Zilpah

- אָשֵׁר
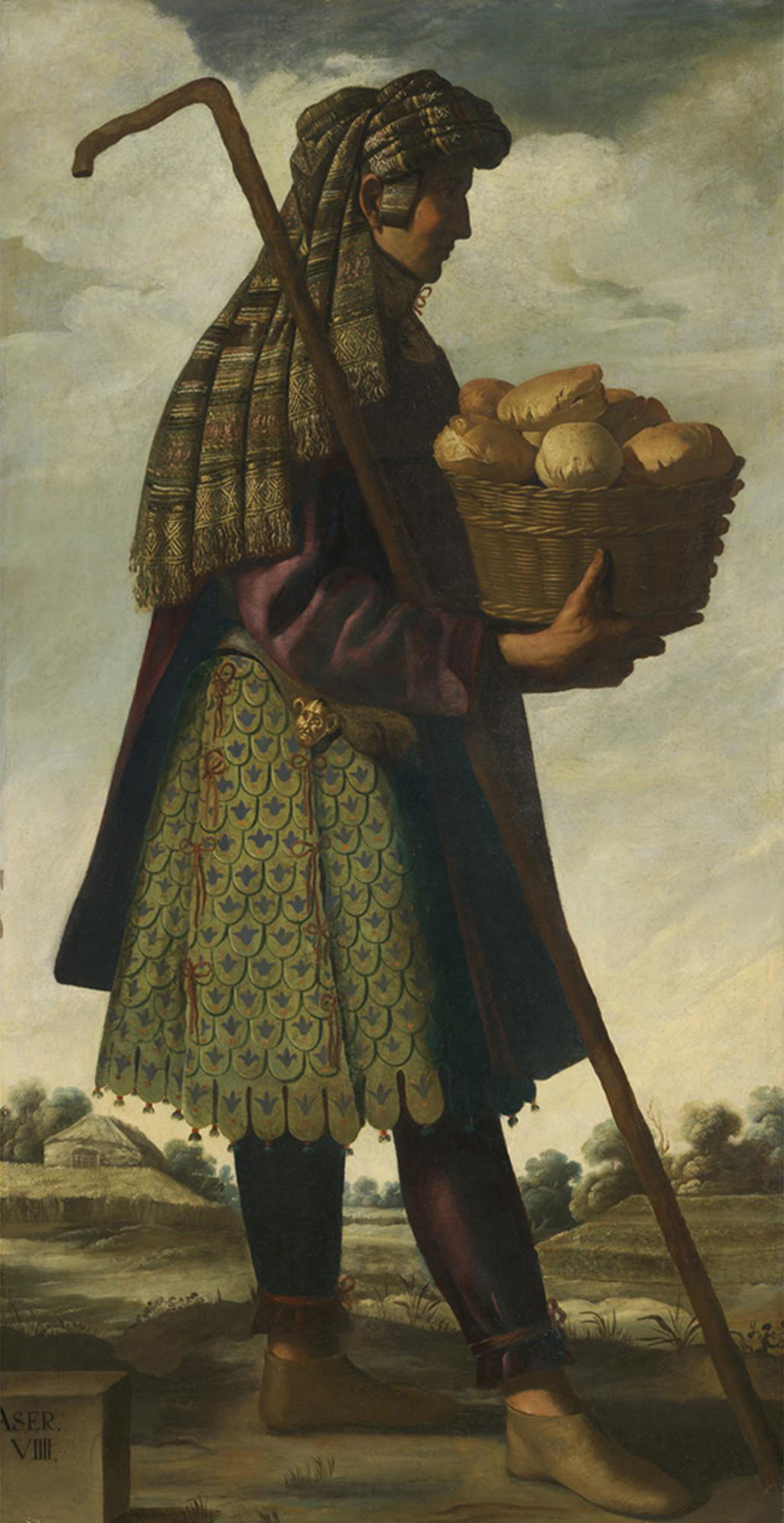
- Painting by Francisco de Zurbarán (from Jacob and his twelve sons, c. 1640–45)
- Pronunciation: Asher
- Born: 2 Shevat or 20 Shevat
- Died: (aged 123)
- Spouses: Adon (first wife); Hadurah (second wife)
- Children: Sons through Hadurah: Imnah (son); Ishvah (son); Ishvi (son); Beriah (son); Serah (daughter)
- Parents: Jacob (father); Zilpah (mother)
- Relatives: Reuben (half brother); Simeon (half brother); Levi (half brother); Judah (half brother); Dan (half brother); Naphtali (half brother); Gad (brother); Issachar (half brother); Zebulun (half brother); Dinah (half sister); Joseph (half brother); Benjamin (half brother)

Asher (Biblical Hebrew: אָשֵׁר, romanized: ’Āšēr), in the Book of Genesis, was the younger of the two sons of Jacob and Zilpah, who was the handmaid of Jacob's wife Leah, and Jacob's eighth son overall. He was the founder of the Israelite Tribe of Asher.

== Name ==
The Torah states that the name אָשֵׁר (Asher) means "happy" or "blessing", implying a derivation from the Biblical Hebrew term osher in two variations: beoshri (meaning 'in my good fortune'), and ishsheruni. At his birth, Leah exclaimed, "Happy am I! for the daughters will call me happy: so she called his name Asher", meaning "happy".

The name אָשֵׁר is a typical Semitic name, deriving from the Hebrew root ʔ-š-r ('to be happy') and the stative nominal stem.

== Biblical narrative ==
The biblical account records that Zilpah, Leah's handmaid, was offered to Jacob to provide him with more children after Leah had given birth to four sons and thought she would have no more children. Gad was Zilpah's first-born son, and Asher her second.

Asher and his four sons and daughter settled in Canaan. On his deathbed, Jacob blessed Asher by saying that "his bread shall be fat, and he shall yield royal dainties" (Genesis 49:20). Moses said of Asher: "May Asher be blessed above other sons; may he be esteemed by his brothers; may he bathe his feet in olive oil" (Deuteronomy 33:24). Asher was the eighth son of the patriarch Jacob and the traditional progenitor of the tribe of Asher.

The Torah states that Asher had four sons and one daughter, who were born in Canaan and migrated with him to Egypt, with their descendants remaining there until the Exodus; this seems to be partly contradicted by Egyptian records (assuming a late Exodus date), according to which a group named Aseru, a name from which Asher is probably derived, were, in the 14th century BC, living in a similar region to Asher's traditional territory, in Canaan.

Asher's daughter, Serah (also transliterated as Serach), is the only granddaughter of Jacob mentioned in the Torah (Genesis 46:17). Her mother is not named. According to classical Rabbinic literature, Serach's mother was named Hadurah and was a descendant of Eber. Although Hadurah was a wife of Asher, it was her second marriage, and Serach's father was actually Hadurah's first husband, who had died. In the Rabbinic literature, Hadurah's marriage to Asher was his second marriage as well, his first having been to Adon, who was a descendant of Ishmael. The Book of Jubilees contradicts this, arguing instead that Asher's wife was named Ijon (which probably means 'dove'). Asher's sons were Jimnah, Ishuah, Isui, and Beriah.

== In rabbinical literature ==
Asher was the very one whose endeavor it had always been to reconcile the brothers—especially when they disputed which of them was destined to be the ancestor of the priests (Sifre Deuteronomy 355). In Asher 5 of the Testaments of the Twelve Patriarchs, Asher is regarded as the example of a virtuous man who, with singlemindedness, strives only for the general good. According to classical rabbinical literature, Asher had informed his brothers about Reuben's incest with Bilhah. As a result, Asher was on bad terms with his brothers. Once Reuben confessed to incest, the brothers realised they had been unjust towards Asher. Asher's motivation is described by classical rabbinical sources as being entirely innocent of evil intent and always in search of harmony between his brothers.

Asher was born on 20 Shevat 2199 (1562 BCE) and, according to some accounts, died on 2 Shevat.

Asher married twice. His first wife was Adon, a great-granddaughter of Ishmael; his second was Hadurah, a granddaughter of Eber and a widow. By her first marriage, Hadurah had a daughter named Serah, whom Asher treated as if she were his own. According to the Book of Jubilees 34:20, Asher's wife was named Iyon (probably, "dove").

Asher's descendants, in more than one regard, deserved their name ("Asher" meaning "happiness"). The tribe of Asher was the one most blessed with male children, and their women were so beautiful that priests and princes sought them in marriage. The abundance of olive oil in the land possessed by Asher so enriched the tribe that none of them needed to hire a habitation. The soil was so fertile that, in times of scarcity, especially in the Sabbatical year, Asher provided all of Israel with olive oil. The Asherites were also renowned for wisdom.

== In later interpretation ==
Some biblical scholars regard the biblical text as indicating that its authors saw the tribe of Asher as being not of entirely Israelite origin; they believe that Asher consisted of certain clans affiliated with portions of the Israelite tribal confederation, but which were never incorporated into the body politic.

In the New Testament, after the announcement that Mary will become the mother of Jesus, she declares that "from now on all generations will call me blessed". This statement has been seen as an echo of Leah's expression of joy after Asher's birth.

== Tomb ==
A Samaritan tradition recorded in the late 19th century considered Neby Toba near Tubas to be the burial place of Asher.
