= Dinah =

Daughter of Jacob in Hebrew Bible

- דִּינָה
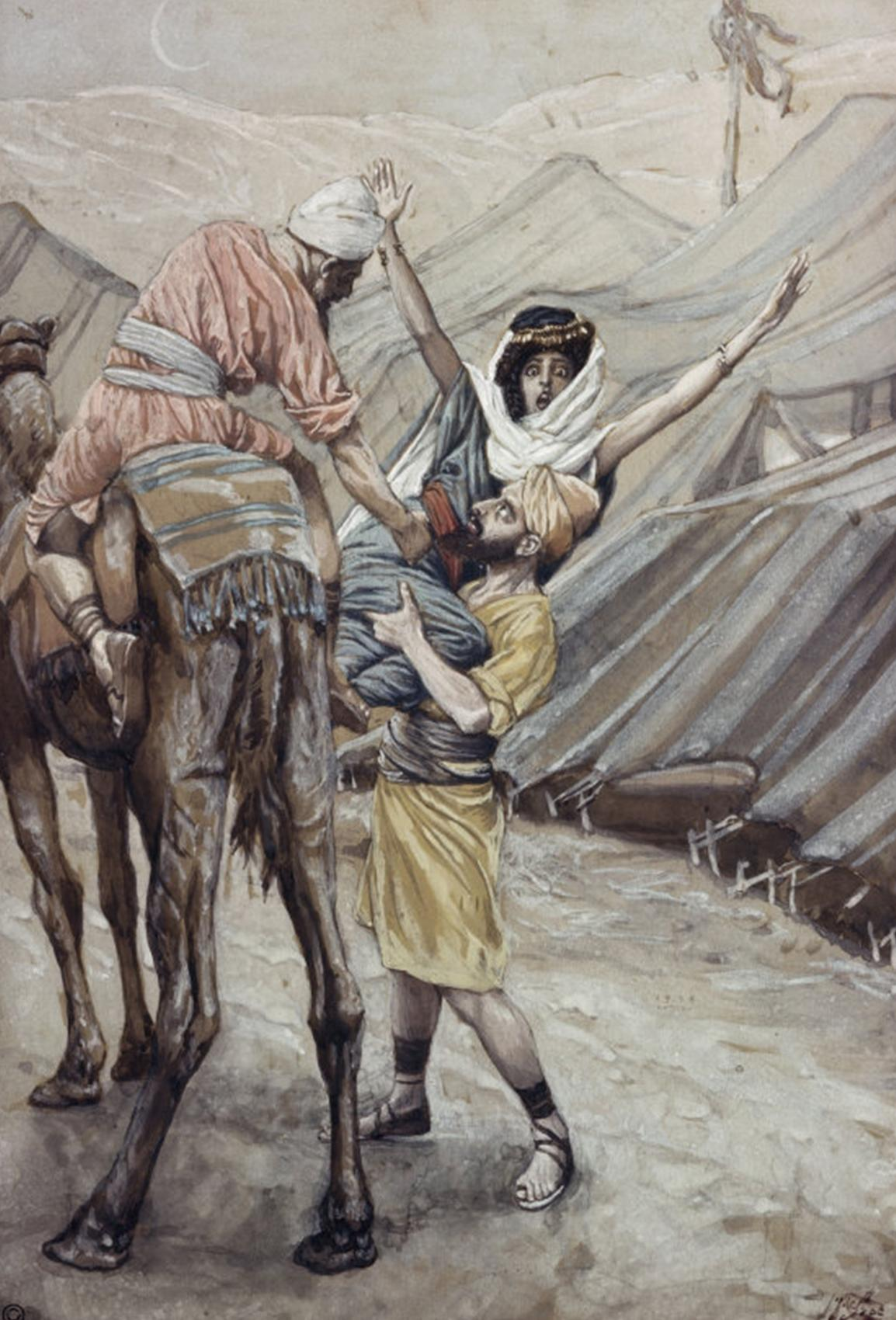
- The abduction of Dinah, depicted by James Tissot
- Pronunciation: Dina
- Born: 7 Tishrei
- Spouse: unknown
- Parents: Jacob (father); Leah (mother)
- Relatives: Reuben (brother); Simeon (brother); Levi (brother); Judah (brother); Dan (half brother); Naphtali (half brother); Gad (half brother); Asher (half brother); Issachar (brother); Zebulun (brother); Joseph (half brother); Benjamin (half brother); Rachel (aunt/step-mother)

In the Hebrew Bible’s Book of Genesis, Dinah (/ˈdaɪnə/; Hebrew: דִּינָה, Modern: Dīna, Tiberian: Dīnā, 'judged'; 'vindicated') was the seventh child and only named daughter of Leah and the Israelite patriarch, Jacob. (Note: Genesis later refers to Jacob's "daughters" (plural), and says of Jacob that "altogether his sons and his daughters numbered thirty-three".) An account of her rape by Shechem, son of a Canaanite or Hivite prince, and the subsequent revenge taken by Dinah's brothers Simeon and Levi, commonly referred to as the rape of Dinah, is told in Genesis 34.

== In Genesis ==
=== Birth ===
Dinah is first mentioned in Genesis 30:21 of the Hebrew Bible as the Israelite daughter of Leah and Jacob, born to Leah after she had borne six sons.

=== Rape and revenge ===
In Genesis 34, Dinah went out to visit the women of Shechem, where her people had made camp and where her father Jacob had purchased the land in which he had pitched his tent. Shechem (son of Hamor, the prince of the land) then took her and raped her, but how this text is to be exactly translated and understood is the subject of scholarly controversy.

Shechem asked his father to obtain Dinah for him as his wife. Hamor came to Jacob and asked for Dinah for his son: "Make marriages with us; give your daughters to us, and take our daughters for yourselves. You shall dwell with us; and the land shall be open to you." Shechem offered Jacob and his sons any bride-price they named. But "the sons of Jacob answered Shechem and his father Hamor deceitfully, because he had defiled their sister Dinah"; they said they would accept the offer if the men of the city agreed to be circumcised like the Hebrews.

So the men of Shechem were deceived, and were circumcised. On the third day, when they were sore, two of the sons of Jacob and Leah, Simeon and Levi, led their army and massacred all the Shechemite men, including Hamor and Shechem, by sword, freed Dinah from Shechem's house, and stole the women and treasures.

"Then Jacob said to Simeon and Levi, 'You have brought trouble on me by making me odious to the inhabitants of the land, the Canaanites and the Perizzites; my numbers are few, and if they gather themselves against me and attack me, I shall be destroyed, both I and my household.' But they said, 'Should he treat our sister as a harlot?'" (Genesis 34:31).

=== Departure to Egypt ===
When Jacob's family prepares to descend to Egypt, Genesis lists the 70 family members who went down together (Genesis 46:8–27). Dinah is specifically listed in verse 15: "These are the sons of Leah, that she bore to Jacob in Padan Aram, and Dinah his daughter". American Rabbi Dovid Rosenfeld states that "That is it. The Torah does not tell us anything about what happened to her for the remainder of her life, nor if she ever married and raised a family".

== Origin of Genesis 34 ==
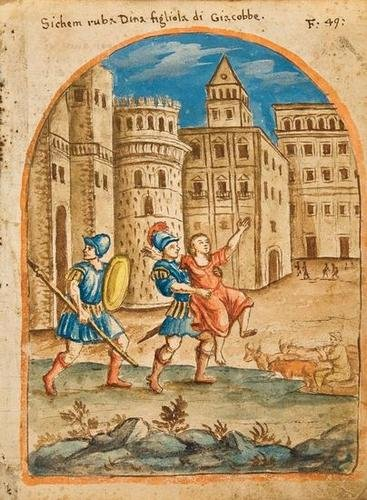
17th-century depiction of the rape of Dinah.

Chapter 34 of the Book of Genesis deals primarily with the family of Abraham and his descendants, including Dinah, her father Jacob, and her brothers. The traditional view is that Moses wrote Genesis as well as almost all the rest of the Torah, doubtlessly drawing on varied sources but synthesizing them into a written history of the Hebrews' ancestors. This view, which has been held for the past several thousand years, although it is not explicitly mentioned in either the Hebrew Bible or the Christian Bible, holds that Moses included this story in the Torah primarily because it happened and he considered it significant. It foreshadows later events and prophecies in Genesis and the Torah concerning the two violent brothers.

Source-critical scholars speculate that Genesis combines separate literary strands with different values and concerns and does not predate the 1st millennium BCE as a unified account. Within Genesis 34 itself, they suggest two layers of narrative: an older account ascribing the killing of Shechem to Simeon and Levi alone, and a later addition (verses 27 to 29) involving all the sons of Jacob. Jonathan Kirsch argues that the narrative combines a Yahwist narrator describing a rape, and an Elohist speaker describing a seduction.

On the other hand, another critical scholar, Alexander Rofé, assumes that the earlier authors would not have considered rape to be defilement in and of itself and posits that the verb describing Dinah as "defiled" was added later: elsewhere in the Bible, only married or betrothed women are "defiled" by rape. He instead says that such a description reflected a "late, post-exilic notion that the idolatrous gentiles are impure [and supports] the prohibition of intermarriage and intercourse with them." Such an alleged concern about ethno-religious intermarriage must therefore indicate a late date for Genesis in the 5th or 4th centuries BCE, when the restored Judean community in Jerusalem was concerned about intermarriage with Samarian groups from a population of mixed origins following the Assyrian and Babylonian deportations. In Rofé's analysis, the "defilement" refers to interracial sex rather than rape.

== In rabbinic literature ==
Midrashic literature contains a series of proposed explanations of the Bible by rabbis. It provides further hypotheses of the story of Dinah, suggesting answers to questions such as her offspring: Osnat a daughter from Shechem, and links to later incidents and characters.

One midrash states that Dinah was conceived as a male in Leah's womb but miraculously changed to a female, lest the maid-servants (Bilhah and Zilpah) be associated with more of the Israelite tribes than Rachel.

Another midrash implicates Jacob in Dinah's misfortune: when he went to meet Esau, he locked Dinah in a box, for fear that Esau would wish to marry her, but God rebuked him in these words: "If thou hadst married off thy daughter in time she would not have been tempted to sin, and might, moreover, have exerted a beneficial influence upon her husband". Her brother Simeon promised to find a husband for her, but she did not wish to leave Shechem, fearing that, after her disgrace, no one would take her to wife. However, she was later married to Job. When she died, Simeon buried her in the land of Canaan. She is therefore referred to as "the Canaanitish woman" (Genesis 46:10). Joseph's wife Asenath (ib.) was her daughter by Shechem. (Note: In the Midrash and Targum Pseudo-Jonathan, she is said to be the daughter of Dinah, Joseph's sister, and Shechem, born of an illicit union, described as either premarital sex or rape, depending on the narrative. A later date apocryphal publication, written in Greek, believed to be a Christian document, called Joseph and Aseneth, supposedly details their relationship and their 48-year long reign over Egypt; in it, Asenath weds Joseph, whose brothers Dan and Gad plot to kill him for the sake of Pharaoh's son, who wants Asenath to be his wife, only for their efforts to be thwarted by Joseph's younger brother Benjamin.)

=== Simeon and Levi ===
On his deathbed, their father Jacob curses Simeon and Levi's "anger" (Genesis 49). Their tribal portions in the land of Israel are dispersed so that they would not be able to regroup and fight arbitrarily. According to the Midrash, Simeon and Levi were only 14 and 13 years old, respectively, at the time of the rape of Dinah. They possessed great moral zealousness (later, in the episode of the Golden Calf, the Tribe of Levi would demonstrate their absolute commitment to Moses' leadership by killing all the people involved in idol worship), but their anger was misdirected here.

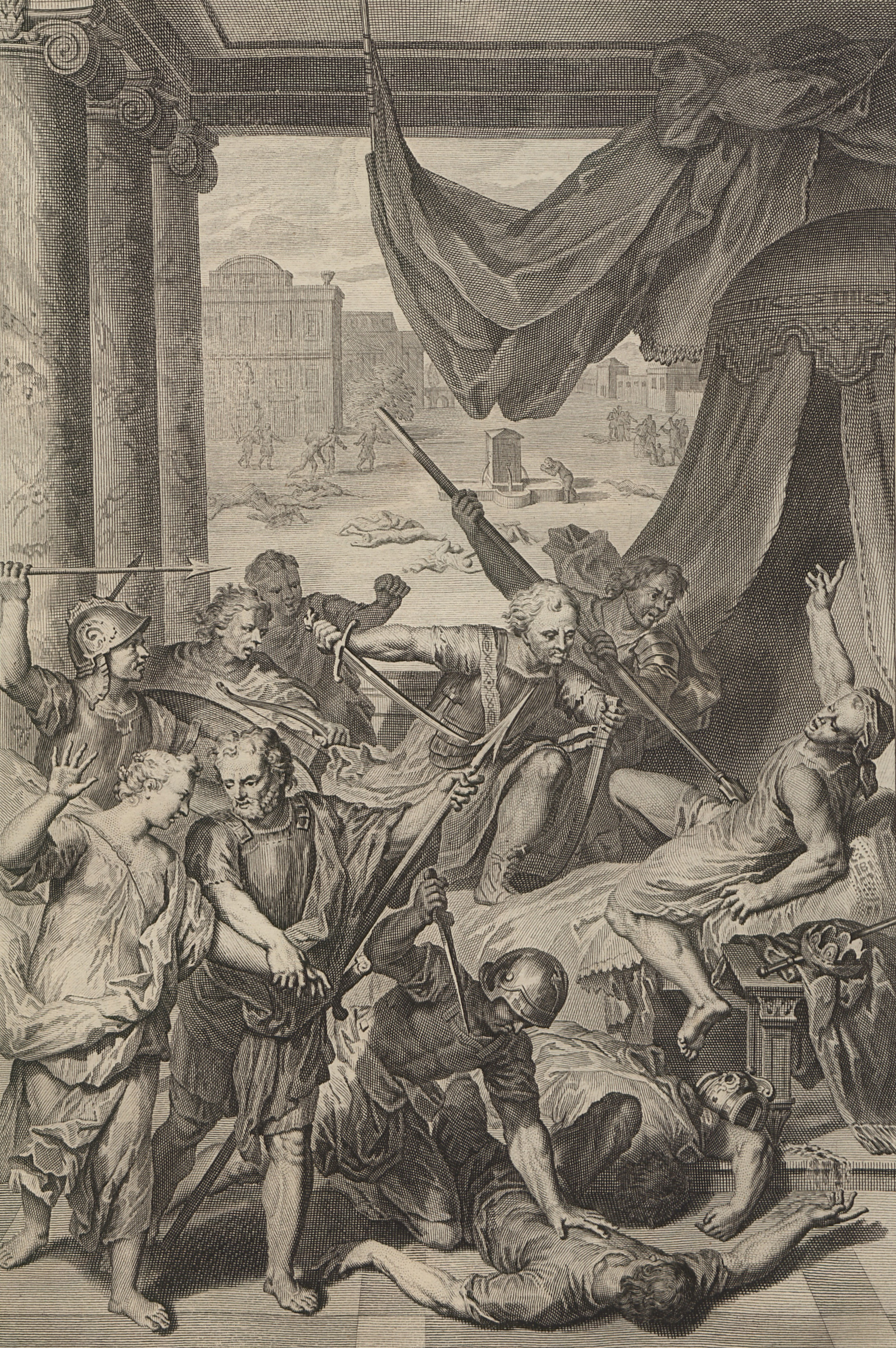
Gerard Hoet: "Simeon and Levi slay the people of Shechem"

One midrash told how Jacob later tried to restrain their hot tempers by dividing their portions in the land of Israel, and neither had lands of their own. Therefore, Dinah's son by Shechem was counted among Simeon's progeny and received a portion of land in Israel, Dinah herself being "the Canaanite woman" mentioned among those who went down into Egypt with Jacob and his sons (Genesis 46:10). When she died, Simeon buried her in the land of Canaan. (According to another tradition, her child from her rape by Shechem was Asenath, the wife of Joseph, and she herself later married the prophet Job.) The Tribe of Simeon received land within the territory of Judah and served as itinerant teachers in Israel, traveling from place to place to earn a living.

In the Hebrew Bible, the tribe of Levi received a few Cities of Refuge spread out over Israel, and relied for their sustenance on the priestly gifts that the Children of Israel gave them.

In medieval rabbinic literature, there were efforts to justify the killing, not merely of Shechem and Hamor, but of all the townsmen. Maimonides argued that the killing was understandable because the townsmen had failed to uphold the seventh Noachide law (denim) to establish a criminal justice system. However, Nachmanides disagreed, partly because he viewed the seventh law as a positive commandment that was not punishable by death. Instead, Nachmanides said that the townsmen presumably violated other Noachide laws, such as idolatry or sexual immorality. Later, the Maharal reframed the issue—not as sin, but rather as a war. That is, he argued that Simeon and Levi acted lawfully insofar as they carried out a military operation as an act of vengeance or retribution for the rape of Dinah.

=== Travel to Egypt ===
The Torah lists the 70 members of Jacob's family who went down together into Egypt (Genesis 46:8–27). Simeon's children include "Shaul the son of a Canaanitish woman" (verse 10). The medieval French rabbi Rashi hypothesized that this Shaul was Dinah's son by Shechem. He suggests that after the brothers killed all the men in the city, including Shechem and his father, Dinah refused to leave the palace unless Simeon agreed to marry her and remove her shame (according to Nachmanides, she only lived in his house and did not have sex with him). Therefore, Shaul is counted among Simeon's progeny, and he received a portion of land in Israel in the time of Joshua. The list of the names of the families of Israel in Egypt is repeated in Exodus 6:14–25 (including "Shaul the son of a Canaanitish woman", verse 15).

== In apocryphical literature ==
In the apocryphal book Testament of Job, Dinah is said to have been Job's second wife after the death of his first wife, who is referred to as "Sitidos".

== In Christianity ==
Early Christian commentators such as Jerome assign some of the responsibility to Dinah, in venturing out to visit the women of Shechem. This story was used to demonstrate the danger to women in the public sphere as contrasted with the relative security of remaining in private.

== In culture ==
=== Symbol of black womanhood ===
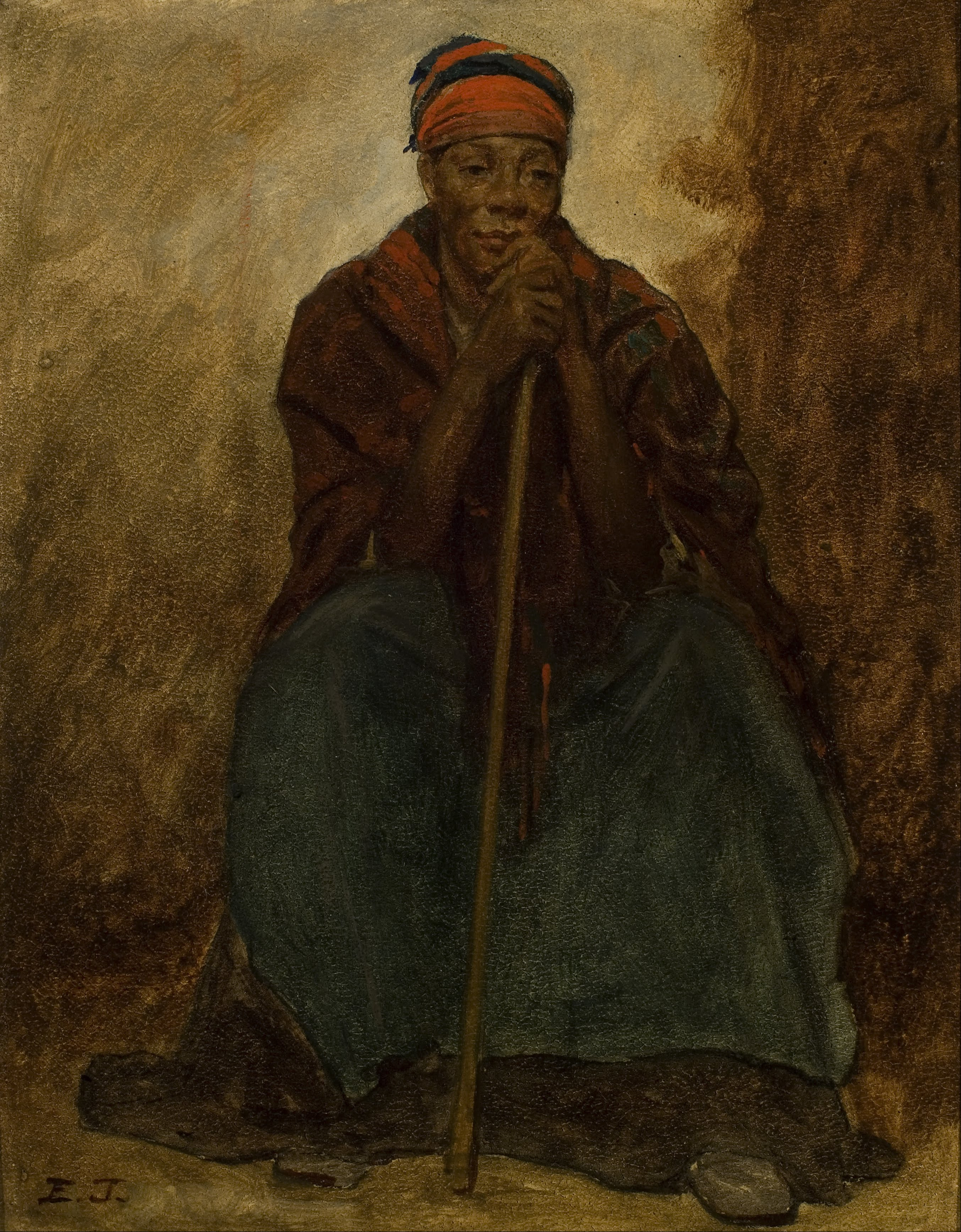
Dinah, Portrait of a Negress by Eastman Johnson

In 19th-century America, "Dinah" became a generic name for an enslaved African woman. At the 1850 Woman's Rights Convention in New York, a speech by Sojourner Truth was reported on in the New York Herald, which used the name "Dinah" to symbolize black womanhood as represented by Truth:

In a convention where sex and color are mingled together in the common rights of humanity, Dinah, and Burleigh, and Lucretia, and Frederick Douglas [sic], are all spiritually of one color and one sex, and all on a perfect footing of reciprocity. Most assuredly, Dinah was well posted up on the rights of woman, and with something of the ardor and the odor of her native Africa, she contended for her right to vote, to hold office, to practice medicine and the law, and to wear the breeches with the best white man that walks upon God's earth.

Lizzie McCloud, a slave on a Tennessee plantation during the American Civil War, recalled that Union soldiers called all enslaved women "Dinah". Describing her fear when the Union army arrived, she said: "We was so scared we run under the house and the Yankees called 'Come out Dinah' (didn't call none of us anything but Dinah). They said 'Dinah, we're fightin' to free you and get you out from under bondage'." After the end of the war in 1865 The New York Times exhorted the newly liberated slaves to demonstrate that they had the moral values to use their freedom effectively, using the names "Sambo" and "Dinah" to represent male and female former slaves: "You are free Sambo, but you must work. Be virtuous too, oh Dinah!"

The name Dinah was subsequently used for dolls and other images of black women.

=== In literature ===
The novel The Red Tent by Anita Diamant is a fictional autobiography of the biblical Dinah. In Diamant's version, Dinah falls in love with Shalem, the Canaanite prince, and goes to bed with him in preparation for marriage. Simeon and Levi, Jacob's sons, instigate the discord between Jacob and the men of the King of Shechem out of fear for their own prosperity, even though Dinah tells them the truth.

A fictionalized account of Dinah's life is included as one of the stories in the short story collection Sarah and After by Lynne Reid Banks.

== See also ==
- Rape in the Hebrew Bible
