= The Red Tent (miniseries) =

US television miniseries by Roger Young

- DVD cover
- Genre: Historical fiction Jewish mythology
- Based on: The Red Tent by: Anita Diamant
- Teleplay by: Anne Meredith; Elizabeth Chandler
- Story by: Anita Diamant
- Directed by: Roger Young
- Starring: Rebecca Ferguson; Minnie Driver; Morena Baccarin; Debra Winger; Iain Glen; Vinette Robinson; Darwin Shaw; Agni Scott
- Theme music composer: Vitek Kral
- Country of origin: United States
- Original language: English
- No. of episodes: 2

Production
- Executive producers: Nancy Bennett; Paula Weinstein
- Producers: Peter McAleese; Karim Debbagh
- Cinematography: Michael Snyman
- Editor: Arthur Tarnowski
- Running time: 176 minutes
- Production companies: Sony Pictures Television; Kasbah-Film Tanger; Spring Creek Productions

Original release
- Network: Lifetime
- Release: December 7 – December 8, 2014

The Red Tent is an American television miniseries produced by Paula Weinstein and directed by Roger Young. The first two-hour episode premiered on Lifetime on December 7, 2014; the second and final episode aired the next day. The series is based on the best-selling novel of the same name by Anita Diamant.

== Plot ==
It is the time of the Old Testament patriarchs of the Book of Genesis. Dinah, the only daughter of Leah and Jacob, chronicles her story from youth through adulthood. She narrates her relationship with her parents, aunts, and eleven older brothers. She often focuses on the significance of the Red Tent, occupied by the women of her tribe (including Jacob's other three wives Rachel, Bilhah and Zilpah) during their time of menstruation. The women have kept alive their old traditions of goddess-worship unbeknownst to their Israelite husbands, managing to keep this secret since men are not allowed in the Red Tent.

In the backstory, Jacob arrives at his uncle Laban's settlement to escape from his older brother Esau, and falls in love at first sight with his cousin Rachel. She reciprocates his feelings, as, secretly, does her sister Leah. Jacob asks Laban for permission to marry Rachel, offering his service to Laban in exchange. Rachel, fearing the consummation of the marriage, switches places with her sister at the wedding. Jacob and Leah share a passionate bridal night. The next morning, he pretends to be upset, informs Laban of the trick, and demands the right to marry Rachel, now upping the stakes by claiming Bilhah and Zilpah as compensation.

Over the next several years, Leah, Bilhah, Zilpah give birth to several sons. Rachel remains childless, until she finally has a son, Joseph, who becomes Jacob's favorite. Soon after, Dinah is born to Leah, and is doted on by her family as the only girl. The tension between Jacob and Laban reaches its climax following the suicide of Laban's abused wife. Jacob takes his wives, children, and livestock, and departs to establish a new settlement. They encounter his estranged older brother, Esau, and the matriarch, Rebekah. Dinah finds her grandmother testy and harsh towards lower-class civilians. Rachel is a talented midwife and takes her niece as apprentice. In an altercation and power struggle, Jacob barges into the Red Tent, and seizes and destroys the teraphim, the women's goddess figurines.

After settling near the city of Shechem, Dinah and Rachel are called to the palace to assist at a birth. Despite her aunt's warning to guard her honor, Dinah meets and falls in love with Prince Shalem, son of the king. The two quickly decide to marry; the king approves, and the marriage is consummated. When he is told of this fait accompli, Jacob is furious that he has not been consulted, as the customs of his tribe expect. Leah blames Rachel for putting romantic fantasies into Dinah's head. Dinah's brothers, Simeon and Levi, interpret the events as seduction and defilement. All the men of the tribe feel insulted and dishonored. Shalem's father offers to pay any bride price they name, to make matters right, but they spurn his gifts. Joseph asks his brothers in exasperation if they want Prince Shalem's foreskin, and they seize on this suggestion, saying that the only thing that will satisfy their honor is for all the men of Shechem to be circumcised. Shalem and his father, to their surprise, agree, and all the men of the city undergo the operation. A couple of nights later, the brothers (but not Joseph) attack the palace while the men are in pain and unable to defend themselves; massacring Shalem, his father, and all the men they can find. Mad with grief, Dinah curses her father and brothers for their sins, and disowns them.

Dinah is pregnant, and her formidable mother-in-law, an Egyptian princess, takes her to safety in Thebes. She gives birth to a son whom she names Bar-Shalem (son of Shalem). However, the Queen, blaming Dinah for the death of her son, claims the baby as her own, names him Ra-Mose and forbids Dinah from revealing the truth. Dinah tries to flee with her son but is caught and beaten into obedience. The Queen permits her to attend her son only as wetnurse and handmaid; she is forced to live as a slave for the next ten years, unwilling to leave him.

Simeon and Levi, jealous of Jacob's favoritism towards Joseph, kidnap their brother and sell him into slavery, and then present his bloody coat as proof that he has been killed, devastating the family. After Ra-Mose is sent away to become a scribe, Dinah is released from the Queen's service, but she still chooses to stay in Thebes and waits another seven years for her son's return. In that time Joseph, who has the power of prophecy, is discovered by the Pharaoh; Joseph interprets his dream and is named the Vizier of Egypt, under the name Zaphnath-Paaneah. Ra-Mose returns to Thebes as the Queen is dying. She reconciles with Dinah by giving her the shawl that Shalem had given her at their first meeting. Ra-Mose discovers that Dinah is his mother, and that her brothers murdered his father. He feels that she is as guilty as they, and rejects her. With her purpose for staying in Thebes lost, Dinah leaves to start a new life.

She marries a kind man named Benia, and begins to practise midwifery again. One day she is summoned to the palace: the wife of the vizier is having a difficult labor. The person summoning her is her son Ra-Mose and the vizier turns out to be her brother Joseph. After Joseph's wife has given birth to a boy, Ra-Mose begs his mother for forgiveness and asks Dinah to tell him the history of her family. Later that night, Dinah and Joseph reunite for the first time in years. Joseph informs Dinah that their mothers have died; Leah died three years prior, peacefully in her sleep, and Rachel died giving birth to a son, Benjamin. Overhearing their talk, Ra-Mose erroneously thinks that Joseph took part in his father's murder, and attempts to kill him before Dinah convinces him of his mistake. Enraged, Joseph orders his execution. Dinah pleads for her son to be spared and reminds Joseph of how much they have to carry the burden of their brothers' sins. At first Joseph refuses to listen, but finally relents and commutes the punishment to banishment. Ra-Mose must assume a new name, and chooses to take the one his mother had given him at birth, Bar-Shalem.

Shortly after, they learn that Jacob is dying and wishes to see all of his children. Dinah initially refuses to see her father, but moved by Joseph's words about putting the past to an end, she agrees. Traveling with her brother and husband, she arrives in Migdal Eder and meets Benjamin for the first time. Dinah reconciles with Jacob in his final moments. Dinah visits the Red Tent to reminisce; the wives of her brothers and their daughters have kept her presence alive there. She leaves the Red Tent knowing that she will always have a place there with the memories and stories passed down through the generations. Finally at peace, she bids farewell to her extended family and returns to live the rest of her life at Thebes.

== Cast ==
- Rebecca Ferguson as Dinah
- Minnie Driver as Leah
- Morena Baccarin as Rachel
- Iain Glen as Jacob
- Debra Winger as Rebecca
- Vinette Robinson as Bilhah
- Agni Scott as Zilpah
- Will Tudor as Joseph
- Sean Teale as Prince Shalem
- Sammy Bennis as Benjamin
- Leigh Lawson as Laban
- Darwin Shaw as Benia

== Production ==
Even though The Red Tent had been in development at Lifetime since 2011, production began in May 2014. The miniseries was filmed on location in Morocco.

== Reception ==
The Red Tent was met with mixed to positive reviews. Review aggregator website Rotten Tomatoes reports a 75% approval rating with an average rating of 7.1/10 based on 12 reviews. The website's consensus reads, "While its premise isn't yet fully realized, The Red Tent boasts an appealing lead and enough energy to suggest greater promise." Metacritic, which uses a weighted average, assigned a score of 57 out of 100, based on 12 critics, indicating "mixed or average reviews".

The Hollywood Reporter referred to The Red Tent as "an engaging and very well cast story of the triumph and resilience of the female spirit", but criticised the miniseries for casting white actors "exclusively in prominent and positive roles" while darker skinned actors were cast in more nefarious roles. Similarly, in her review for LA Times, Mary McManara noted that parts of the miniseries "wander close to parody — Will Tudor's Joseph is a blue-eyed Botticelli in contrast to the Arabic swarthiness of his murderous brothers". Writing for The New York Times, Neil Genzlinger noted that "fans of the novel will no doubt watch and revel in this relatively big-budget treatment. Others might find its pseudo-biblical, pseudo-feminist mix hard to take."

== See also ==
- Jacob
