= The Red Tent (Diamant novel) =

1997 historical novel by Anita Diamant

- Cover of the first-edition hardcover
- Author: Anita Diamant
- Language: English
- Genre: Historical fiction
- Publisher: A Wyatt Book for St. Martin's Press
- Publication date: October 1997
- Publication place: United States
- Media type: Print (hardcover, paperback)
- Pages: 321 pp. (hardcover edition)
- ISBN: 0-312-35376-6
- OCLC: 62322613
- LC Class: PS3554.I227 R43 2005

The Red Tent is a historical novel by Anita Diamant, published in 1997 by Wyatt Books for St. Martin's Press. It is a first-person narrative that tells the story of Dinah, daughter of Jacob and Leah, sister of Joseph. She is a minor character in the Hebrew Bible; Diamant broadened her story. The book's title refers to the tent in which women of Jacob’s tribe must, according to ancient Jewish law, take refuge while menstruating or upon birthing, a period known as niddah, and in which they find mutual support and encouragement from their mothers, sisters, and aunts.

== Plot summary ==
Dinah opens the story by recounting for readers the union of her mother Leah and father Jacob, as well as the expansion of the family to include Leah's sister Rachel, and the handmaids Zilpah and Bilhah. Leah is depicted as courageous and altruistic, Rachel as something of a belle but kind and creative, Zilpah as eccentric and spiritual, and Bilhah as the gentle and quiet one of the quartet.

Dinah remembers sitting in the red tent with her mother and aunts, gossiping about local events and caring for domestic duties between visits to Jacob, the family's patriarch. A number of other characters not seen in the biblical account appear here, including Laban's second wife, Ruti, and her feckless sons.

According to the Hebrew Bible's account in Genesis 34, Dinah was "defiled" by a prince of Shechem, although he is described as being genuinely in love with Dinah. He also offers a bride price fit for royalty. Displeased at how the prince treated their sister, her brothers Simeon (spelled "Simon" in the book) and Levi treacherously tell the Shechemites that all will be forgiven if the prince and his men undergo the Jewish rite of circumcision (brit milah) so as to unite the people of Hamor, king of Shechem, with the tribe of Jacob. The Shechemites agree, and shortly after they go under the knife, while incapacitated by pain, they are murdered by Dinah's brothers and their male servants, who then return with Dinah.

In The Red Tent, Dinah genuinely loves the prince and willingly becomes his bride. She is horrified and grief-stricken by her brothers' betrayal. After cursing her brothers and father for their hypocrisy, she escapes to Egypt, where she gives birth to a son. In time, she finds another love and reconciles with her brother Joseph, now vizier of Egypt. At the death of Jacob, she visits her estranged family. She learns her other living brothers and father have forgotten her but that her story lives on with the women of Jacob's tribe.

== Reception ==
The book was a New York Times bestseller and book club discussion guides for it have been published. According to the Los Angeles Times review, "By giving a voice to Dinah, one of the silent female characters in Genesis, the novel has struck a chord with women who may have felt left out of biblical history. It celebrates mothers and daughters and the mysteries of the life cycle." The Christian Science Monitor wrote that the novel "vividly conjures up the ancient world of caravans, shepherds, farmers, midwives, slaves, and artisans...Diamant is a compelling narrator of a tale that has timeless resonance."

== Historical accuracy and context ==
Diamant acknowledges that there is no evidence that ancient Hebrews used a menstrual tent for retreat, although she describes it as a common feature in other pre-modern cultures, as well as some modern cultures.

Cultural attitudes towards menstruation, including taboos, are widespread throughout history and around the world. These may include the seclusion of girls at puberty and of women after childbirth. Impurity after childbirth was a widespread belief, allied with the need for ritual purification.

== Adaptations ==
Lifetime adapted the novel into a two-part miniseries, which premiered December 7 and 8, 2014. Dinah is portrayed by Rebecca Ferguson. Leah is portrayed by Minnie Driver, and Rachel by Morena Baccarin.

== See also ==
- Culture and menstruation
- Mikvah, a bath of ritual purification
- Niddah

== Sources ==
- Anita Diamant (1997). The Red Tent. Macmillan. ISBN 0-312-16978-7.
- Rabbi J. Avram Rothman, The Red Tent - if you knew Dina like I know Dina. Aish.com, June 2001.
- Photos of the first edition of The Red Tent
