= Pilegesh =

Concubine in Halakha

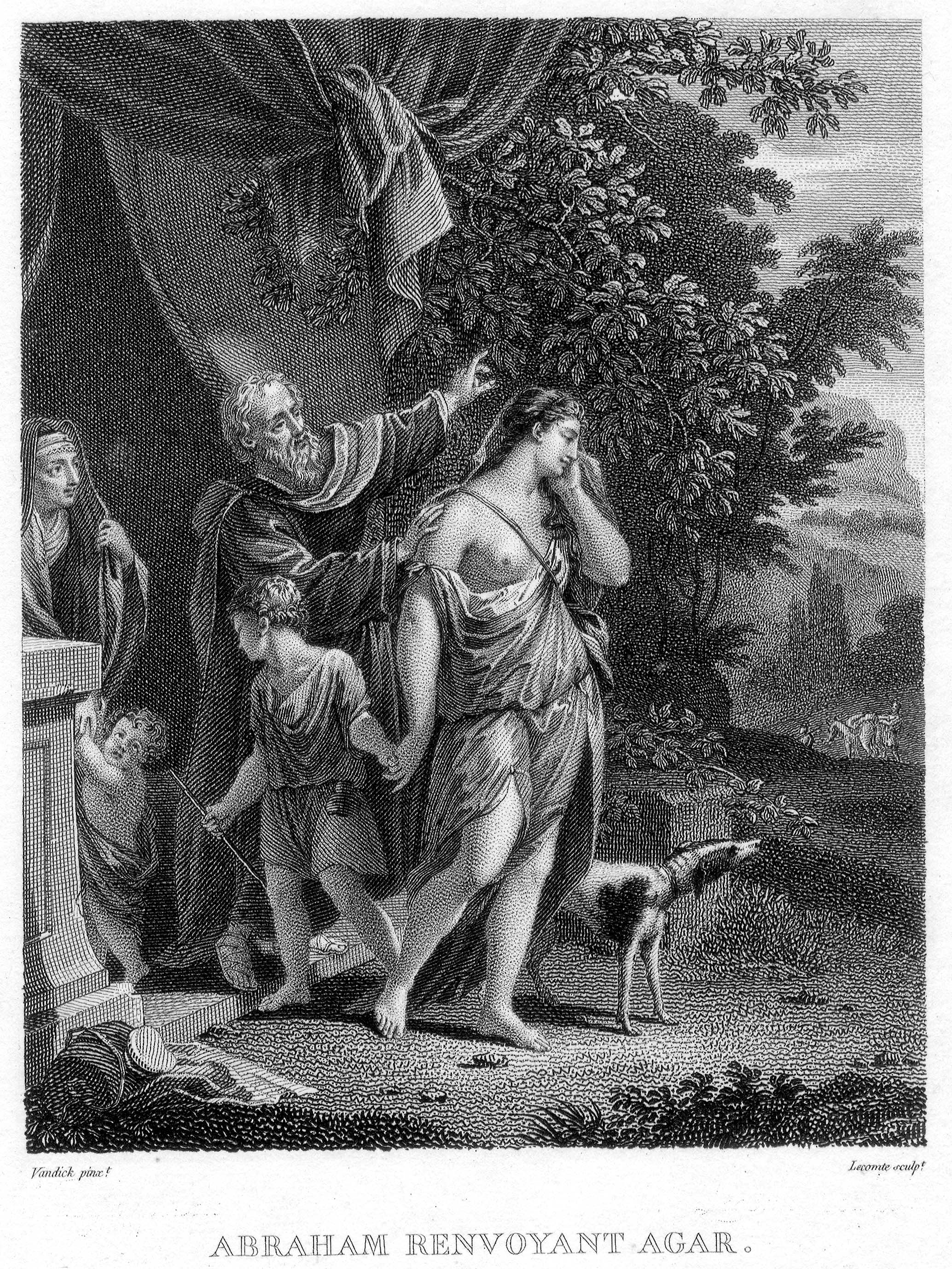
Abraham sending Hagar away

Pilegesh (פִּילֶגֶשׁ, Biblical Hebrew pronunciation: [pʰi.ˈlɛgɛʃ], possibly related to Ancient Greek: παλλακή, romanized: pallakē, lit. 'young woman') is a term from the Hebrew Bible for a concubine, a female, unmarried sexual slave of social and legal status inferior to that of a wife.

Among the Israelites, some men acknowledged their pilgashím, who thus had the same rights in the home as legal wives.

Despite Maimonides' notable dissension, Jewish textual scholars, including Nahmanides, Jacob Emden and the head of the beth din of Akdamot in Jerusalem, have concluded that taking a woman as a concubine is allowed in contemporary Jewish culture.

== Etymology ==
In Judaism, concubines are referred to by the Hebrew term pilegesh (Hebrew: פילגש). The term pilegesh appears to be an Indo-European loanword related to Ancient Greek: παλλακίς pallakis, meaning 'concubine'.

In the Hebrew of the contemporary State of Israel, pilegesh is often used as the equivalent of the English word mistress—i.e., the female partner in extramarital relations—regardless of legal recognition. Attempts have been initiated to popularise pilegesh as a form of premarital, non-marital or extramarital relationship (which, according to the perspective of the enacting person(s), is permitted by Jewish law).

There are many definitions for what a pilegesh relationship is. In the Eastern world, pilegesh fit into the complex family organization and the woman had more of a distinct legal and social position, whereas in the later Western world, pilegesh was regarded as a long-term sex companionship between a man and a woman who could not or would not be married.

== Biblical references ==
Several biblical figures had concubines when they were not able to create natural children with their wives. The most famous example of this was with Abraham and Sarah. Sarah gave her maidservant Hagar to Abraham while maintaining ownership of both maidservant and offspring. Their union produced Ishmael. Hagar gained the status of full wife in regards to Abraham, but nonetheless Sarah retained the status of main wife. This type of pilegesh is recorded in Jewish sources as being a singular case. All later cases of pilegesh recognized the pilegesh and guaranteed similar rights in the house as the legitimate wife.

Since having children in Judaism was considered a great blessing, legitimate wives often gave their maids to their husbands so that they could have children with them when those women themselves were childless, as in the cases of Leah and Zilpah and Rachel and Bilhah. Even in the exceptional case of Sarah and Hagar, Abraham would have been obligated to treat Hagar as a full wife and she would have been treated as an equal by Abraham. Sarah's rights would have been regarding the technical legal status of being considered the inheritor and since the other wife and offspring would have been hers by ownership she became the legal albeit not biological mother of Ishmael.

== Legal characteristics ==
According to the Babylonian Talmud, the difference between a pilegesh and a full wife was that the latter received a ketubah "marriage contract" and her nissu'in or marriage ceremony was preceded by a formal betrothal or kiddushin, which was not the case with the former. According to Rabbi Judah, however, the pilegesh should also receive a marriage contract, but without including a clause specifying a divorce settlement. According to Rashi, "wives with kiddushin and ketubbah, concubines with kiddushin but without ketubbah"; this reading is from the Jerusalem Talmud.

Certain rabbis, such as Maimonides, believed that concubines are strictly reserved for kings, and the am ha'aretz may not have a concubine; indeed, such thinkers argued that commoners may not engage in any type of sexual relations outside of a marriage. Maimonides was not the first Jewish thinker to criticize concubinage; for example, it is severely condemned in Leviticus Rabbah. Other rabbis, such as Nahmanides, Samuel ben Uri Shraga Phoebus, and Jacob Emden, strongly object to the idea that concubines should be forbidden.

According to Mnachem Risikoff, the institution of the pilegesh is an alternative to formal marriage, which does not have the requirements for a get upon the dissolution of the relationship, thus negating the issue of the aguna.

Any offspring created in a union between a pilegesh and a man were on equal legal footing with children of the man and his wife.

== See also ==
- Polygamy § Judaism
