= Patriarchs (Bible) =

Biblical figures Abraham, Isaac and Jacob

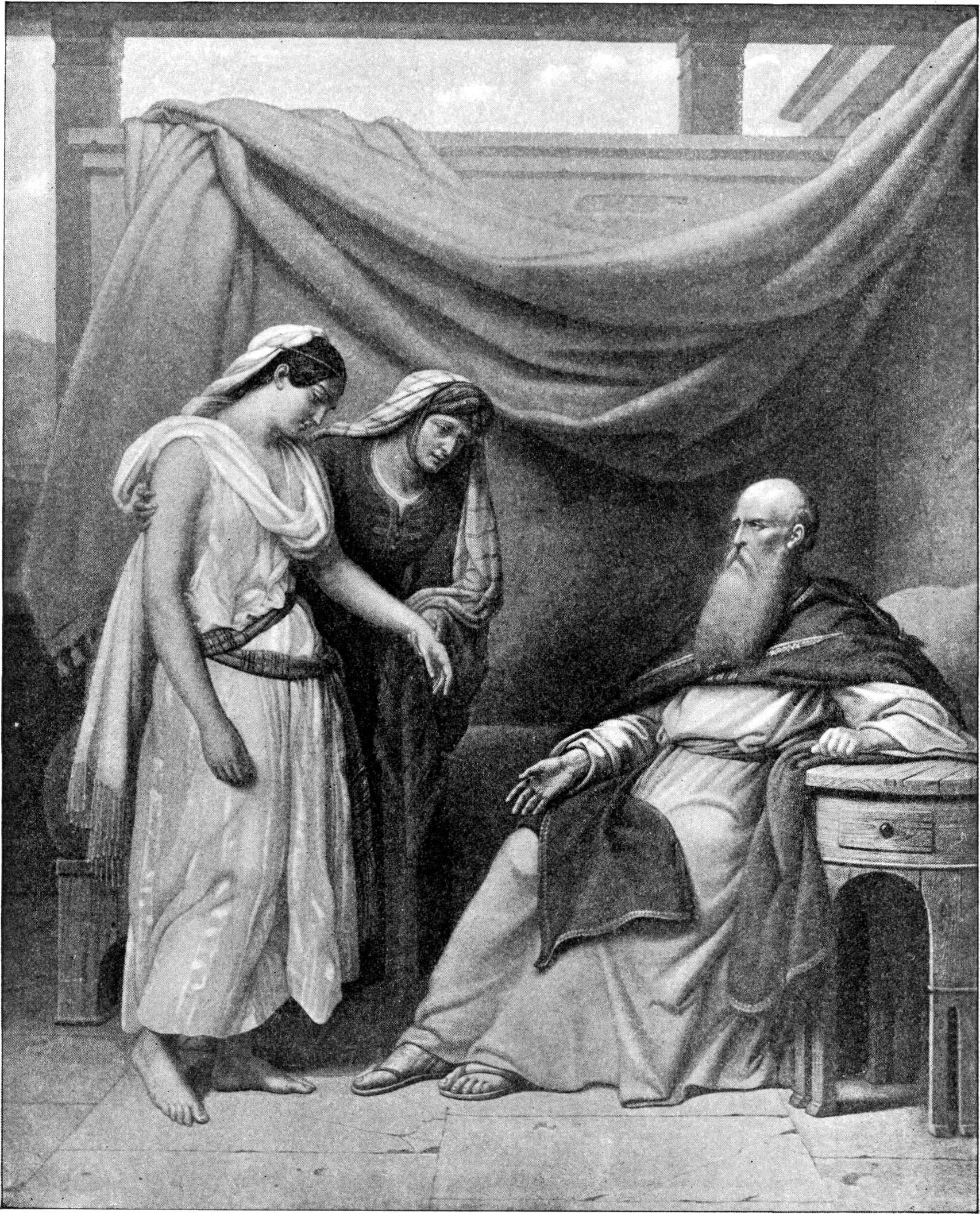
Abraham, Sarah and Hagar, imagined here in a Bible illustration from 1897.

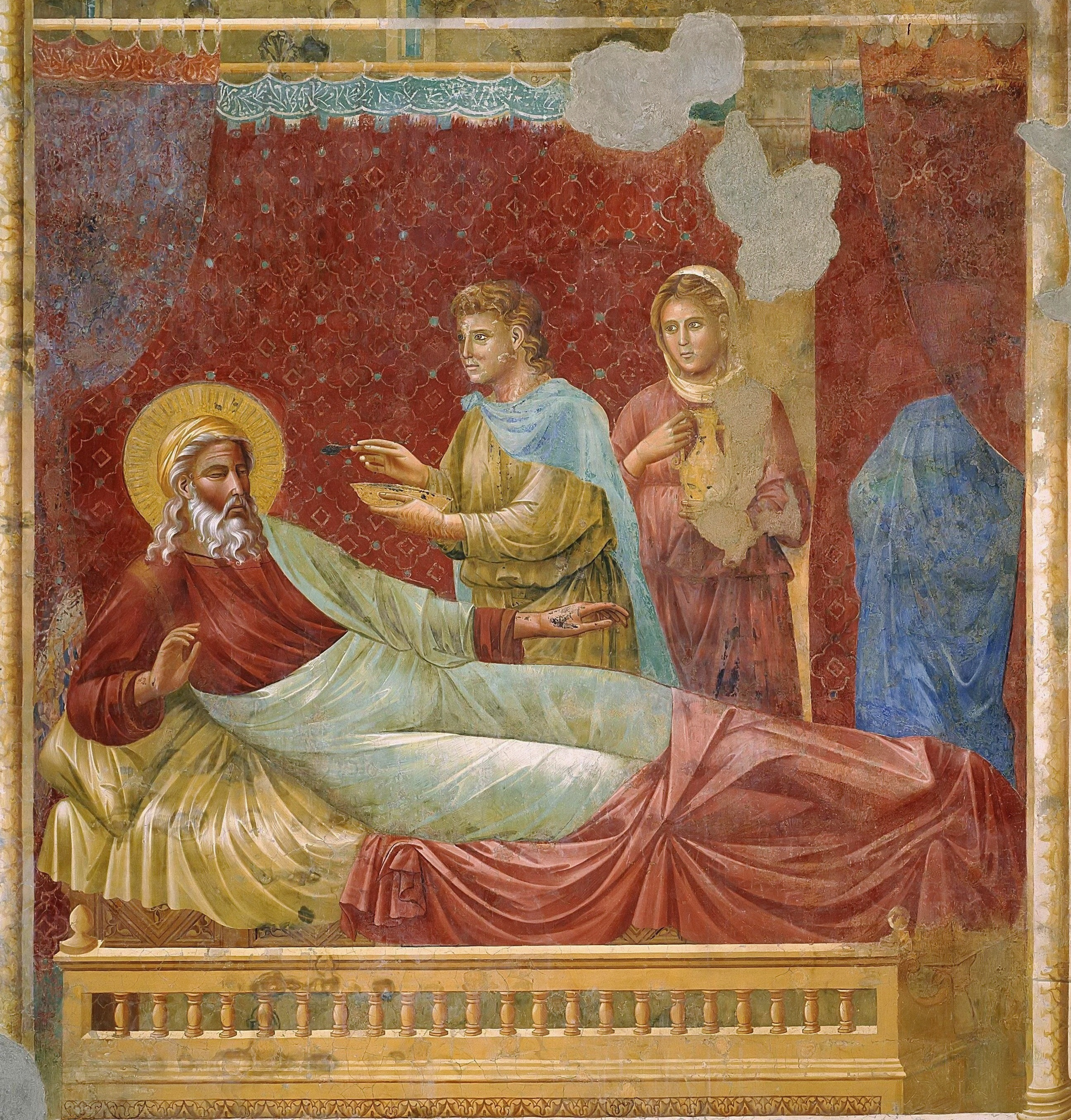
Isaac blessing his son, as painted by Giotto di Bondone

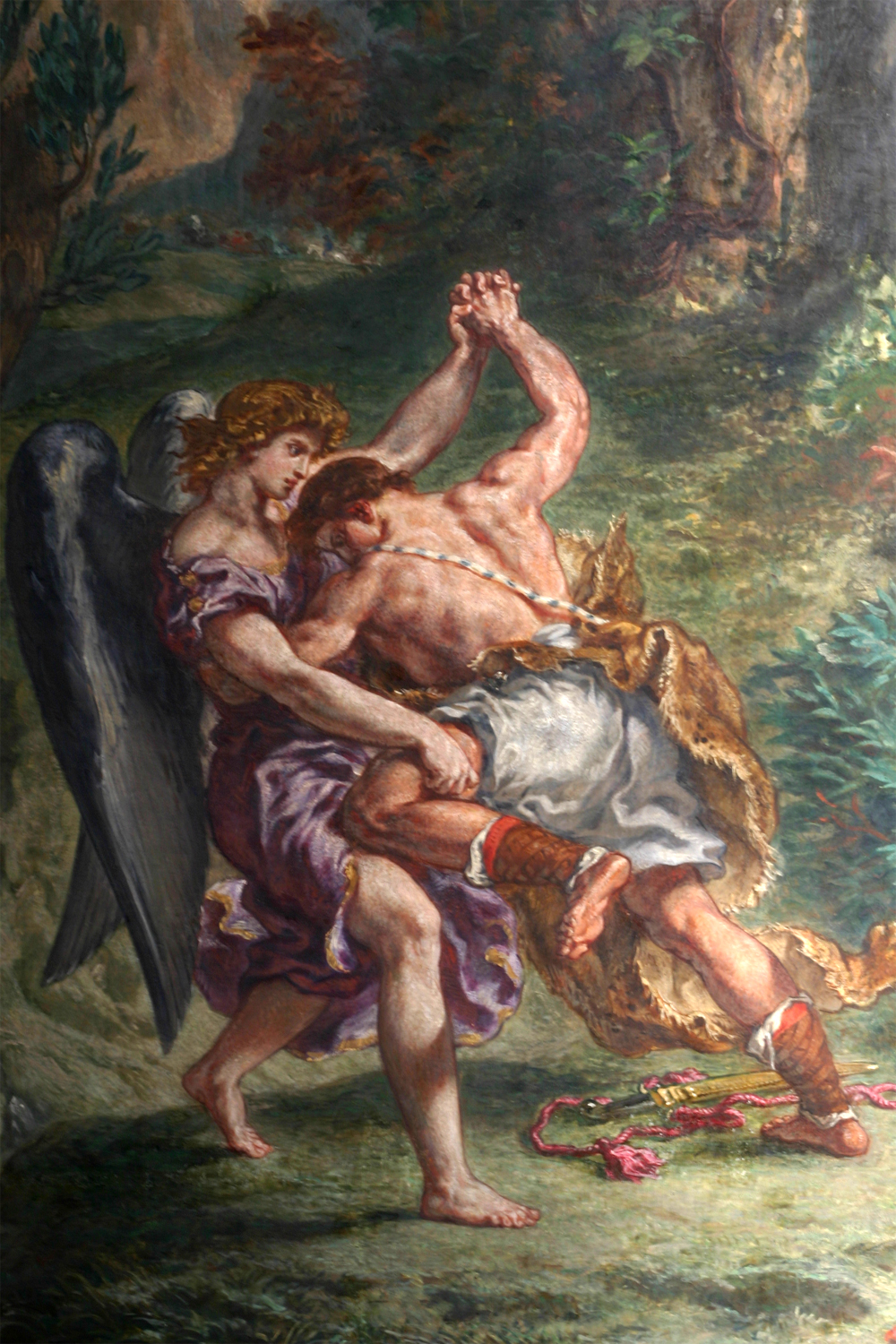
Jacob Wrestling with the Angel by Eugène Delacroix

The patriarchs (Hebrew: אבות ʾAvot, "fathers") of the Bible, when narrowly defined, are Abraham, his son Isaac, and Isaac's son Jacob, also named Israel, the ancestor (according to the Abrahamic tradition) of the Israelites. These three figures are referred to collectively as "the patriarchs", and the period in which they lived is known as the patriarchal age.

Judaism, Christianity, and Islam hold that the patriarchs, along with their primary wives, known as the matriarchs (Sarah, Rebekah and Leah), are entombed at the Cave of the Patriarchs, a site held holy by the three religions. Rachel, Jacob's other wife, is said to be buried separately at what is known as Rachel's Tomb, near Bethlehem, at the site where she is believed to have died in childbirth.

More widely, the term patriarchs can be used to refer to the twenty male ancestor-figures between Adam and Abraham. The first ten of these are called the antediluvian patriarchs, because they came before the Flood.

Scholars have noted that with regards to the Patriarchs' historicity, archaeology has so far produced no direct evidence for their existence. Archaeologist William G. Dever wrote: "After a century of exhaustive investigation, all respectable archaeologists have given up hope of recovering any context that would make Abraham, Isaac, or Jacob 'historical figures'."

== Definitions ==
The patriarchs of the Bible, when narrowly defined, are Abraham, his son Isaac, and Isaac's son Jacob, also named Israel, the ancestor of the Israelites. These three figures are referred to collectively as the patriarchs, and the period in which they lived is known as the patriarchal age. They play significant roles in Hebrew scripture during and following their lifetimes. They are used as a significant marker by God in revelations and promises, and continue to play important roles in the Abrahamic faiths. Judaism, Christianity and Islam hold that the patriarchs, along with their primary wives, known as the matriarchs – Sarah (wife of Abraham), Rebekah (wife of Isaac) and Leah (one of the wives of Jacob) – are entombed at the Cave of Machpelah in Hebron, a site held holy by the three religions. Rachel is said to be buried separately at what is known as Rachel's Tomb, near Bethlehem, at the site where she is believed to have died in childbirth.

More widely, the term patriarchs can be used to refer to the twenty male ancestor-figures between Adam and Abraham. The first ten of these are called the antediluvian patriarchs, because they came before the Flood.

In some contexts, such as in the Testament of the Twelve Patriarchs, "patriarchs" could also include the twelve sons of Jacob.

== Lifespans ==
The lifetimes given for the patriarchs in the Masoretic Text of the Book of Genesis are: Adam 930 years, Seth 912, Enos 905, Kenan 910, Mahalalel 895, Jared 962, Enoch 365 (did not die, but was taken away by God), Methuselah 969, Lamech 777, Noah 950. Gerhard von Rad said:

The long lives ascribed to the patriarchs cause remarkable synchronisms and duplications. Adam lived to see the birth of Lamech, the ninth member of the genealogy; Seth lived to see the translation of Enoch and died shortly before the birth of Noah. Noah outlived Abram's grandfather, Nahor, and died in Abram's sixtieth year. Shem, Noah's son, even outlived Abram. He was still alive when Esau and Jacob were born!

Explanation of color-codes:

- Lifespans recorded in the Septuagint: Black (^{▄▄}) and gray (^{▄▄}) (Note: Methuselah survived the flood according to the Septuagint (but not the Masoretic text or Samaritan Pentateuch), even though he was not on Noah's Ark.)
- Lifespans recorded in the Samaritan Pentateuch: Gold (^{▄▄}), yellow (^{▄▄}), and brown (^{▄▄})
- Lifespans recorded in the Masoretic text: Crimson (^{▄▄}), vermilion (^{▄▄}), and cinnabar (^{▄▄})

== Matriarchs ==
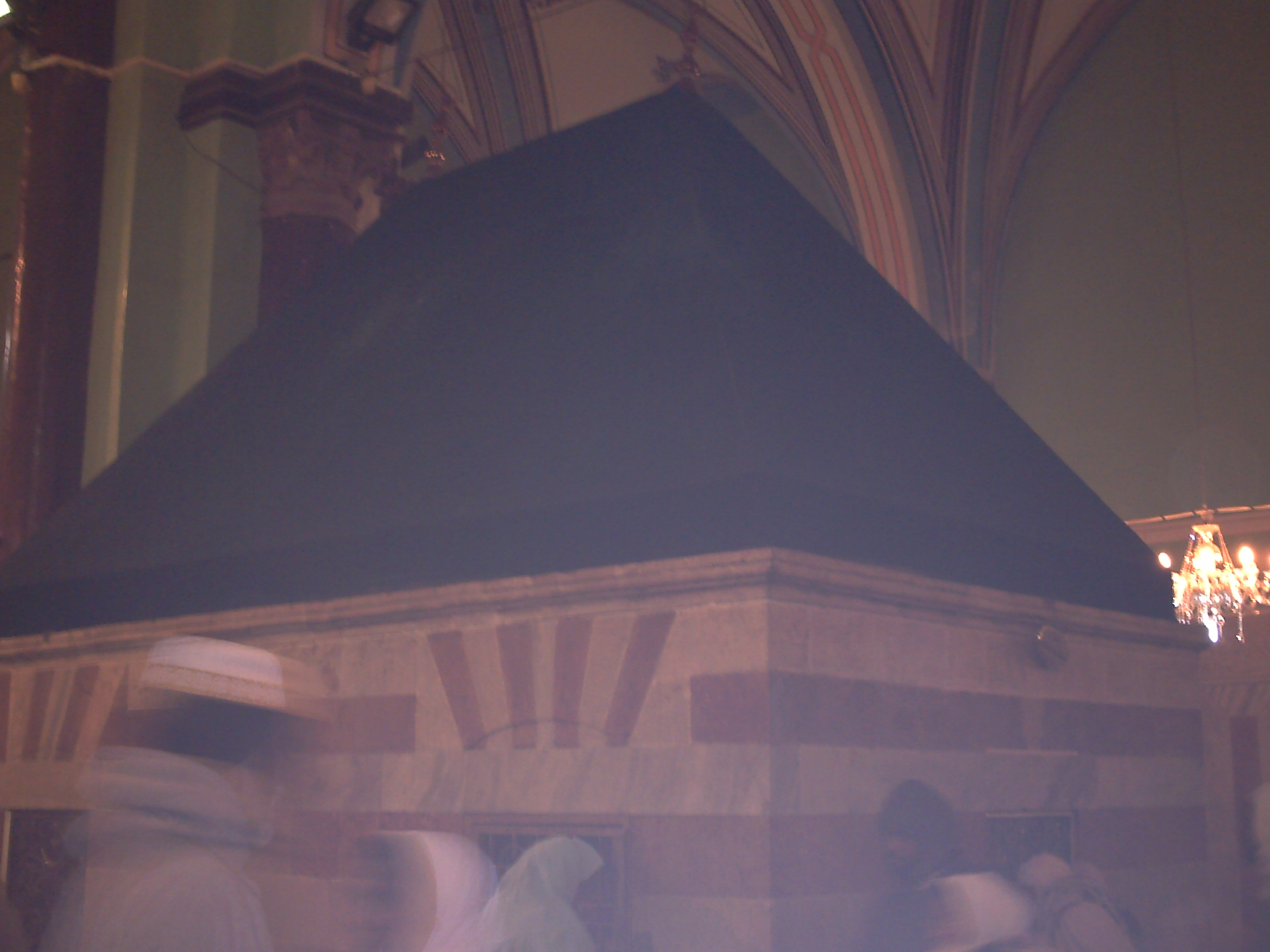
Cave of the Patriarchs, Hebron

The matriarchs, also known as "the four mothers" (ארבע האמהות), are:

- Sarah, the wife of Abraham
- Rebekah, the wife of Isaac
- Leah and Rachel, the wives of Jacob.

Some Jewish sources list Bilhah and Zilpah (Jacob's concubines) as additional or secondary matriarchs, giving a total of six matriarchs. Other sources also include an emphasis on Tamar (the daughter-in-law of Judah) and Asenath (Osnat) (the wife of Joseph).

== See also ==
- Chronology of the Bible
