= Tomb of the Matriarchs =

Tomb in Tiberias, Israel

Coordinates: 32°48′07.2″N 35°31′21.4″E

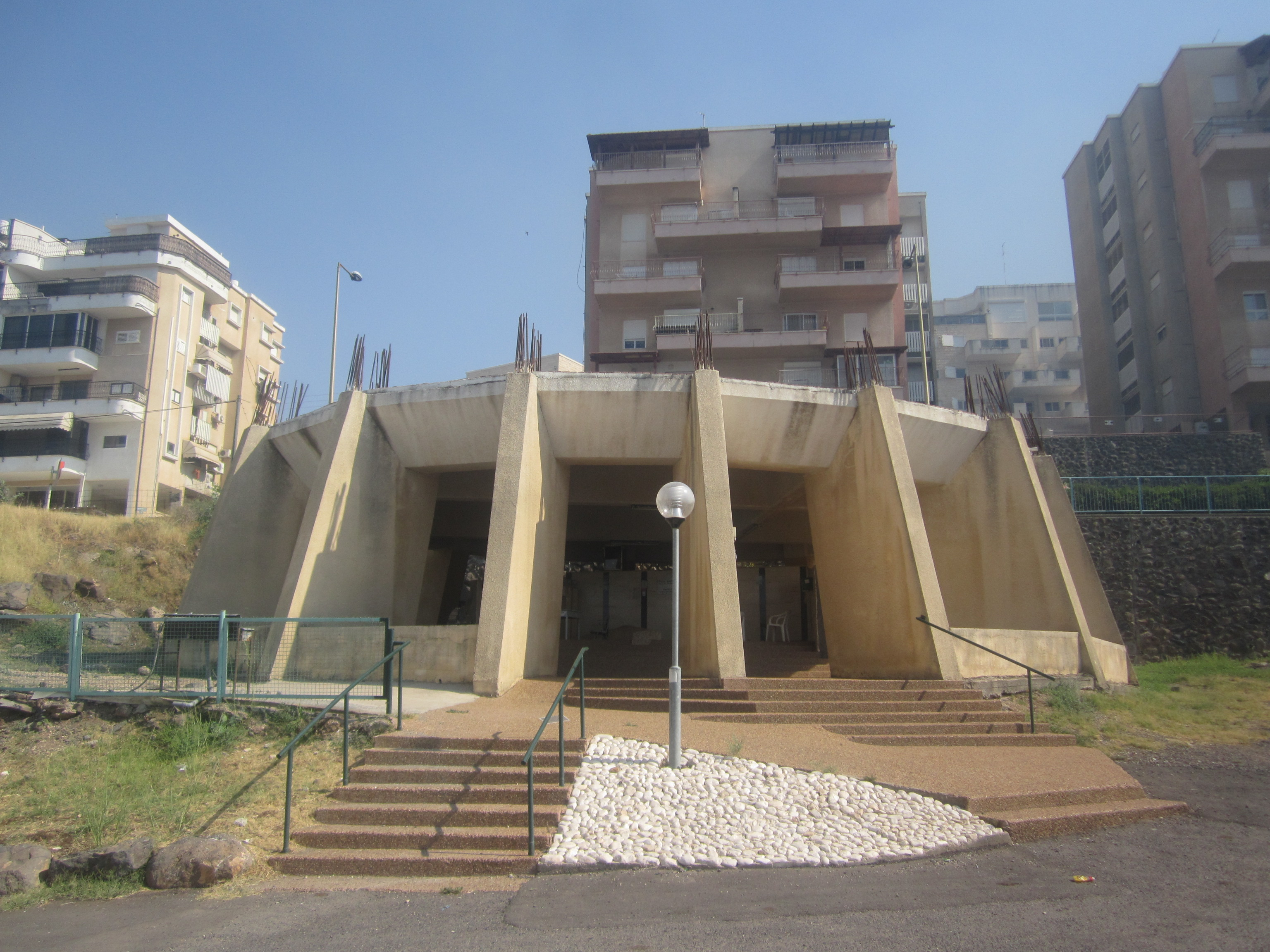
Tomb of the Matriarchs

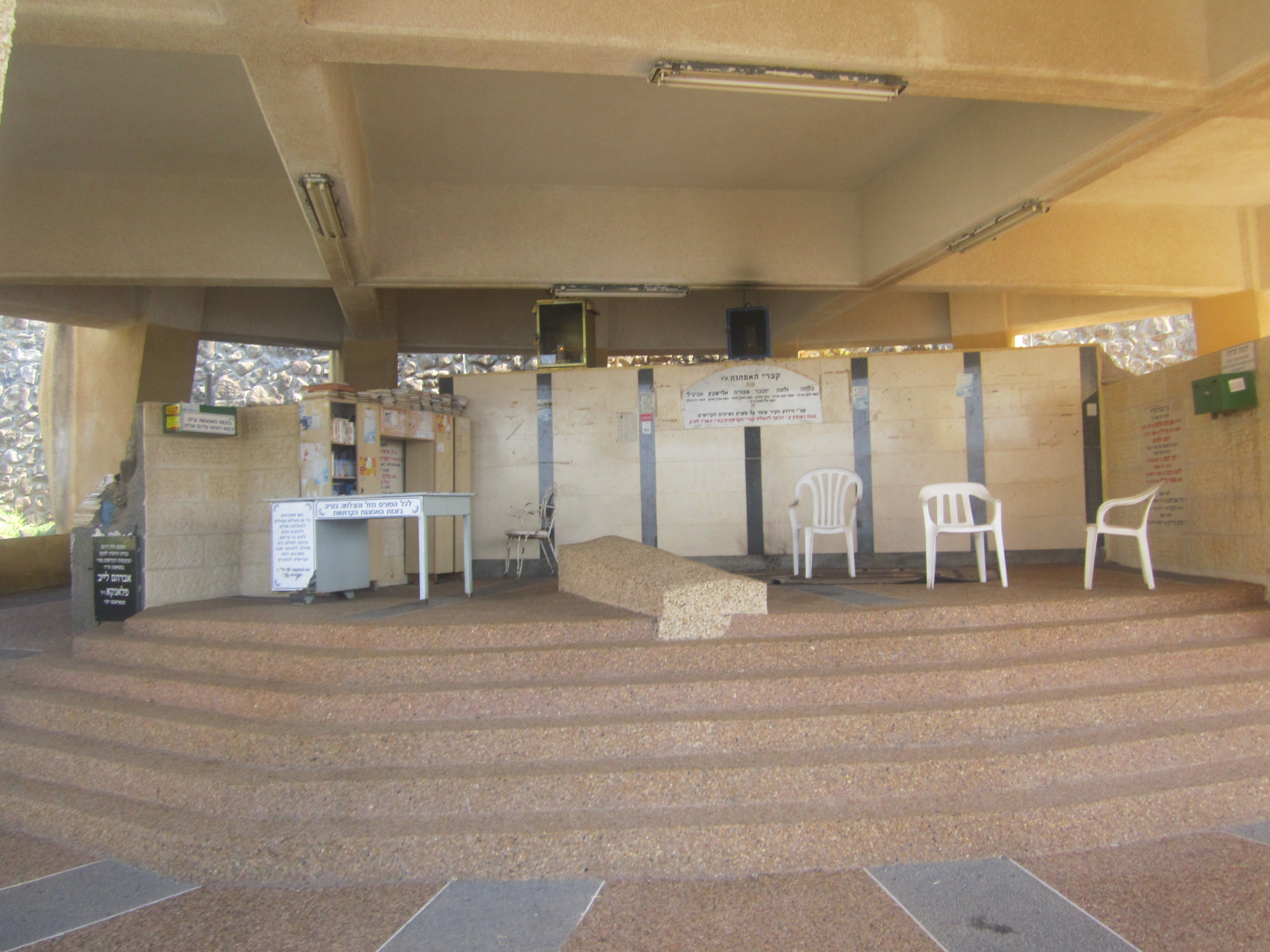
Tomb of the Matriarchs

The Tomb of the Matriarchs (Hebrew: קבר האמהות, Kever ha'Imahot) in Tiberias, Israel, is the traditional burial place of several biblical women:

- Bilhah, handmaid of Rachel.
- Zilpah, handmaid of Leah.
- Jochebed, mother of Moses.
- Zipporah, wife of Moses.
- Elisheba, wife of Aaron.
- Abigail, one of King David's wives.

The marble structure beside a modern apartment building block is surrounded by a stone wall.

== See also ==
- List of burial places of biblical figures
