= Testaments of the Twelve Patriarchs =

Apocryphal scripture connected with the Bible

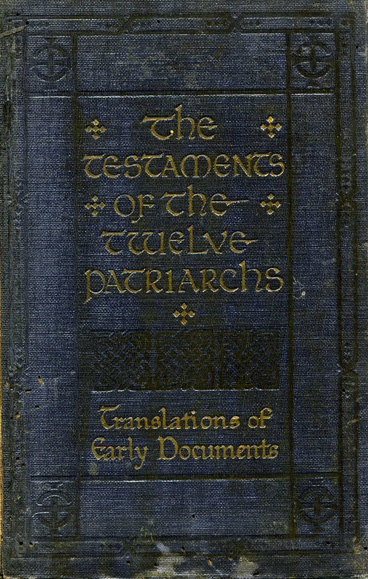
A 1917 edition of the Testaments of the Twelve Patriarchs.

The Testaments of the Twelve Patriarchs is a constituent of the apocryphal scriptures connected with the Bible. It is believed to be a pseudepigraphical work of the dying commands of the twelve sons of Jacob. It is part of the Oskan Armenian Orthodox Bible printed in 1666. Fragments of similar writings were found at Qumran, but opinions are divided as to whether these are the same texts. It is generally considered apocalyptic literature.

The Testaments were written in Hebrew or Greek, and reached their final form in the 2nd century CE. In the 13th century they were introduced into the Western world through the agency of Robert Grosseteste, Bishop of Lincoln, whose Latin translation of the work immediately became popular. He believed that it was a genuine work of the twelve sons of Jacob, and that the Christian interpolations were a genuine product of Jewish prophecy; he accused Jews of concealing the Testaments "on account of the prophecies of the Saviour contained in them."

With the critical methods of the 16th century, Grosseteste's view of the Testaments was rejected, and the book was disparaged as a mere Christian forgery for nearly four centuries. Currently, scholarly opinions are still divided as to whether it is an originally Jewish document that has been retouched by Christians, or a Christian document written originally in Greek but based on some earlier Semitic-language material. Scholarship tends to focus on this book as a Christian work, whether or not it has a Jewish predecessor (Vorlage).

== Manuscripts ==
The Testaments are known from fifteen Greek manuscripts; the oldest preserved complete version dates from the tenth century. There is also a Slavonic version, and a Serbian version close it. An Armenian version—which contains fewer Christian interpolations than the Greek version—is attested by about fifty manuscripts. An editio minor (a preliminary edition) of the Armenian version of the Testaments of the Twelve Patriarchs was published in 2012. The early European translations are based on a Latin version made from the Greek text.

Aramaic fragments of documents relating to Levi (1Q21, 4Q213, 4Q213a, 4Q213b, 4Q214, 4Q214a, 4Q214b, 4Q215, 4Q540, 4Q541); Judah (3Q7, 4Q538); and Joseph (4Q539) have been found at Qumran among the Dead Sea Scrolls. An ancient Hebrew fragment of the Testament of Naphtali was also discovered at Qumran at Cave 4 (4Q215).

Fragments of Levi, similar to 1Q21 and dated to the ninth century, were discovered in the genizah of a Karaite synagogue in Cairo. There is also a later medieval Hebrew version of the testament of Naphtali. Analysis of the discrepancies between the different fragments and copies reveals a process of synthesis and interpolation within the text.

The Testaments are not often cited in Patristic literature.

== Historical references ==
There is little external testimony regarding the Testaments: Tertullian appears to quote a passage of the Greek text of the Testament of Benjamin in his polemic against docetic theologian Marcion of Sinope (AD 85 - 160), but this is not certain. Aside from that, a mention of them by name appears in a work of Origen (AD 185 - 253), while there are doubtful references by Jerome (AD ~345 - 420) and Procopius (AD 500 - 565), as well as specific mentions in the Stichometria of Nicephorus of Constantinople (758 - 828) and in the Synopsis Sacrae Scripturae (long attributed to Athanasius of Alexandria but now considered to be anonymous). After that, no reference to the Testaments exists until they were rediscovered by Bishop Grosseteste.

== Ethics ==
Testaments are regarded as exhortatory writings; ethics therefore are fundamental to the text. The Testaments have many different ethical motifs, the foremost of which is adhering to God's commandments. Each testament discusses a certain vice or virtue.

Another theme, extensively discussed by Hollander, is the role that Joseph plays in the ethics. He is often the example of an ethical man, and the deeds of the patriarchs are often weighed against those of Joseph.

As argued by Robert Henry Charles, who studied and translated the Testaments in the beginning of the 20th century,

the main, the overwhelming value of the book lies ... in its ethical teaching, which has achieved a real immortality by influencing the thoughts and diction of the writers of the New Testament, and even those of our Lord.

He writes that the Testaments help to "bridge the chasm that divides the ethics of the Old and New Testaments." To a modern reader, the main value of the Testaments, is not in the variations on biblical text, but in their ethical teachings, as amplified by the following citations:

- Love the Lord through all your life, and one another with a true heart
- Love yea one another from the heart; and if a man sin against thee, speak peacefully to him, and in thy soul hold not guile; and if he repent and confess, forgive him. But if he deny it, do not get into a passion with him, lest catching the poison from thee he take to swearing, and so then sin doubly …
- Love the Lord and your neighbor.
- Anger is blindness, and does not suffer to see any man with truth
- Hatred, therefore is evil; etc.

(from The Apocrypha in English. Edited by Rev. R. H. Charles.)

== Summary ==
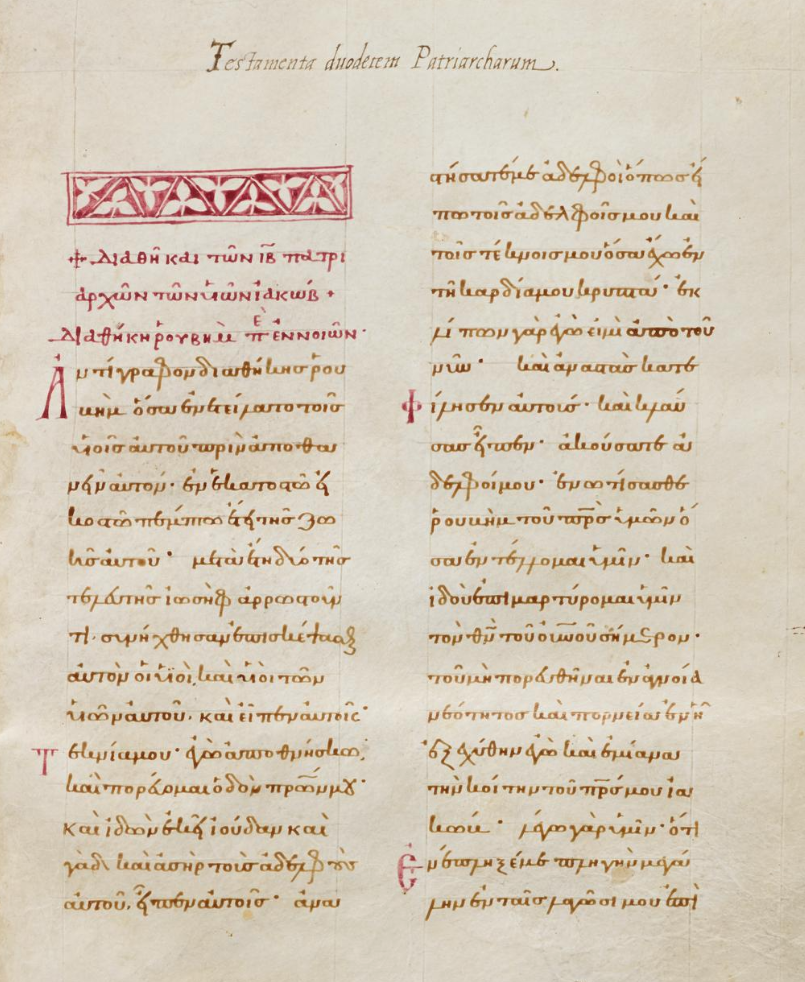
First page of the 10th- or 11th-century Greek manuscript acquired by Grosseteste

The work is divided into twelve books, each purporting to be the last exhortations of one of the twelve titular patriarchs. In each, the patriarch first narrates his own life, focusing on his strengths, virtues, or his sins, using biographical material from both the Hebrew Bible and Jewish tradition. Next, he exhorts his listeners to emulate the one and to avoid the other. Most of the books conclude with prophetic visions.

=== Reuben ===
The Testament of Reuben is predominantly concerned with admonishing lust, and the sinfulness of Reuben in his having had sexual intercourse with Bilhah, a concubine of his father. It is likely that the author wished to cover the topic of fornication anyway, and assigned it for Reuben to discuss due to Reuben's relationship with Bilhah being recounted in the canonical Bible.

The Testament adds that Reuben spies Bilhah as she bathes in secret; and that when she later becomes drunk, Reuben rapes her. That trope derives from a reading of Genesis 49:4, "wanton as water", as "wanton in water", taken from the Book of Jubilees. This theme is also in 2 Samuel 11:2's account of David and Bathsheba.

The Testament portrays women as the cause of the downfall of the Watchers, and of man in general (excepting Bilhah, in accordance with Jubilees). Joseph is on the other hand portrayed as the ideal, for his resistance against Potiphar's wife.

=== Simeon ===
The Testament of Simeon is primarily a diatribe against envy. In the Genesis narrative, Simeon is portrayed as having been bound in chains by Joseph, and the author of the Testament argues that Simeon had wanted to kill Joseph due to jealousy, allowing the Testament to continue with a discourse about envy. The narrative of the Testament explains that it was Judah who had sold Joseph into slavery, and goes on to portray Joseph as the ideal of virtue and generosity.

The Testament 5:4-6 in an aside attacks Simeon's children for the sin of miscegenation, Numbers 25. It does not mention the attack on Shechem, which in the Torah Simeon had mounted alongside brother Levi. Instead it posits that Simeon made war against Levi. Kugel concludes that the Testament agreed with Jubilees 30:23 in that the attack on Shechem was "righteous", and so the Testament suppressed the account to deny Simeon credit.

=== Levi ===
The Testament of Levi is an apocalyptic section. It is one of the longest of the Testaments, and is predominantly concerned with arrogance. Taking the theme of the Levite priesthood, the Testament explains how Levi's descendants corrupted the office by their arrogant disregard for the proper regulations.

Chapter 2-8 involves Levi being taken to heaven and promised the priesthood forever, and then seven angels physically give him the insignia of the priesthood (as described in Exodus). This part parallels the beginning and end of a vision in the Aramaic Levi Document, whence the body of the vision is now lost; and is thought to preserve that part of the text.

In chapters 14-18 Levi cites a "book of Enoch", describing the sins of his descendants, with the promise that at the end there will be a glorious priest who will restore the righteousness of his office. The tropes of Levi's "Book" match those of the "Apocalypse of Weeks" in 1 Enoch.

The Testament has an account of the raid on Shechem. Its take is that Jacob proposed a marriage between Shechem and Dinah, sincerely offering Shechem the option of circumcision. Levi opposed the circumcision from the start. Unlike Jubilees and, if Kugel is right, the Testament of Simeon: to the Testament of Levi, intermarriage is lawful in principle between Israelites and converts. Shechem was excluded for its other crimes.

==== Aramaic Levi document ====
One way in which this testament is distinguished from the others is by additional footnotes in a Greek version of the manuscript from Mount Athos. These footnotes were found to be translated from a non-apocalyptic precursor of the text in Aramaic, partially preserved in the Dead Sea Scrolls. The find consisted of six fragments in two manuscripts from cave 4 (4Q213-214). A small related fragment was also found in cave 1 (1Q21). According to some sources, these scrolls were dated by the Oriental Institute to between 100-200 BC using radiocarbon dating.

According to James Kugel at Bar-Ilan University, Aramaic Levi is a composite of two documents. One source was "a wisdom apocalypse derived from the exegetical elaboration of Malachi 2:4-7". The other, based on the same exegesis, "described Levi's actual initiation into the priesthood by angels". The narrative frame is based from the Book of Jubilees. The compiler of Aramaic Levi added that the priests would be kings. It is a Hasmonean compilation, 133–100 BCE.

=== Judah ===
The Testament of Judah is primarily concerned with courage, monetary greed, and fornication. It begins by portraying Judah as idealistically courageous, involving bravery in front of wild beasts, as well as successful military expeditions, sometimes basing the narrative on acts that the canonical bible attributes to Jacob. However, it goes on to present a xenophobic focus, criticizing his marriage to a non-Israelite, as well as his sexual activity with Tamar, his daughter-in-law who at that time was pretending to be a prostitute.

The narrative argues that Judah had sex with Tamar and his wife due to drunkenness, and that he bribed his wife's father in order to be allowed to marry her. It then goes on to instruct that the role of a king is lesser than that of a priest, and that Levi is more important, clearly pointing to the theocratic attitude of the author.

=== Issachar ===
The Testament of Issachar predominantly concerns asceticism, which the text portrays as virtuous. The narrative however begins by retelling the biblical tale of Leah's purchase of Jacob's nocturnal services by the giving of mandrakes to Rachel. Rachel is portrayed as virtuous for being more chaste than Leah.

The remainder of the narrative portrays Issachar himself as leading a godly and simple agricultural life. This is based on Genesis 49:14-15: Issachar had loved the land such that he "bent his shoulder to the burden" and became a tiller for hire. The same exegesis is at work in the Septuagint and Samaritan Targum of Genesis.

=== Zebulun ===
Zebulun was the sixth son of Leah and Jacob. He is described as an inventor and philanthropist and the text relates what he learned as a result of the plot against Joseph.

"The copy of the words of Zebulun, which he enjoined on his sons before he died in the hundred and fourteenth year of his life, two years after the death of Joseph. 2 And he said to them: Hearken to me, ye sons of Zebulun, attend to the words of your father. 3 I, Zebulun, was born a good gift to my parents. 4 For when I was born my father was increased very exceedingly, both in the flocks and herds, when with the straked rods he had his portion. 5 I am not conscious that I have sinned all my days, save in thought. 6 Nor yet do I remember that I have done any iniquity, except the sin of ignorance which I committed against Joseph; for I covenanted with my brethren, because they had all agreed that if any one should declare the secret, he should be slain."

=== Dan ===
The Testament of Dan treats the topics of anger and lying. The main vice, however, is anger.

Dan first explains his feelings of jealousy towards his brother Joseph. The spirit of anger tempted him towards murdering Joseph. Fortunately, the Lord did not deliver Joseph into Dan's hands.

Dan then goes on to explain how the spirit of anger works. It covers your eyes, and distorts your vision. Through this you do not recognise people for who they really are. In the case of Joseph, Dan speaks from experience. Furthermore, it disturbs the mind so that the Lord departs from it and Beliar inhabits it.

Therefore, Dan's children should keep the commandments of the Lord, and stay near to the Lord. Dan goes into more depth through a prediction about the future, including one SER (Sin-Exile-Return) and three LJ (Levi-Judah) passages. In this Dan talks of a saviour arising from Levi and Judah that will set the souls free from Beliar.

Again, Dan reminds his sons to stay near to God, and also to his interceding angel, and the saviour of the Gentiles. If they listen to Dan's warning, then his children will be received by the saviour of the Gentiles and be saved.

The testament ends with an apparent gloss (inasmuch as one can speak of a gloss in a pseudepigraph), which points out that the prophecies of Dan did indeed happen.

=== Naphtali ===
The Testament of Naphtali has apocalyptic elements in it. It opens with the genealogy of Bilhah, his mother, whose father is said to be Rotheus. His vision represents Levi seizing the sun and Judah the moon. The young man with the twelve palm branches seems to be a reference to the Apostles. Joseph seizes a bull and rides on it. He has a further dream in which he sees a storm at sea and the brethren being separated. Again, there is a reference to the recurrent theme of sexual relations.

A Hebrew fragment of the Testament of Naphtali was discovered at Qumran among the Dead Sea Scrolls taken from Cave 4 (4Q215).

Two versions of a medieval Hebrew Testament of Naphtali exist, with one being a secondary elaboration of the other. These medieval texts are not identical to the Qumran fragment or the Greek version in the Testaments of the Patriarchs. They are believed to represent a translation from a non-Hebrew source, probably Greek.

=== Gad ===
The Testament of Gad begins with Gad's hatred for Joseph. Chapter Two begins with Gad talking about loving one another. He says 'and now, my children, I exhort you, love ye each one his brother, and put away hatred from your hearts, love'. The moral of Gad is to not hate one another and love all your brethren.

=== Asher ===
The Testament of Asher is the shortest of the twelve and unlike the others does not begin with a deathbed scene. It is regarding the subject of the two ways to live. The main appeal in Asher is to follow truth with singleness of faith.

=== Joseph ===
The Testament of Joseph primarily concerns Chastity, and seems heavily to be based on Joseph's resistance against Potiphar's wife that the canonical bible portrays. The narrative contains a large expansion on the attempts of Potiphar's wife to seduce Joseph, portraying her as first threatening Joseph, then employing torture, then flattering Joseph, then plotting to kill her husband so that Joseph would be able to marry her without bigamy, then using love potions, and finally threatening suicide.

=== Benjamin ===
The Testament of Benjamin is very much an appendix to that of Joseph. It opens with the account Joseph gave Benjamin of how he was sold to the Ishmaelites. He exhorts his descendants against deceit, but, as all his brethren, he warns them against fornication.

== Prophecy ==
The Testaments of the Twelve Patriarchs contain a substantial amount of prophecy concerning the coming of the Messiah. From a Christian perspective, a number of statements can be associated with events in the life of Jesus. Many consider this significant since several of the books are thought to predate Jesus.

For example, compare the following passages from the Testament of Levi:

The heavens shall be opened, and from the temple of glory shall come upon him sanctification, with the Father's voice as from Abraham to Isaac. And the glory of the Most High shall be uttered over him, and the spirit of understanding and sanctification shall rest upon him in the water. (Levi 18:21-22)

with this passage from the Gospel of Matthew

As soon as Jesus was baptized, he went up out of the water. At that moment heaven was opened, and he saw the Spirit of God descending like a dove and lighting on him. And a voice from heaven said, "This is my Son, whom I love; with him I am well pleased." (Matthew 3:16–17)

== Use in the New Testament ==
Charles called attention to the frequent use of the Testaments of the Twelve Patriarchs by Paul and other writers of the New Testament. In particular:

- I Thess. ii. 16 is a quotation of Test. Patr., Levi, 6:10-11;
- Rom. 12:19 is taken from Gad, 6:7;
- Rom. 12:21 is taken from Benjamin, 4:3;
- II Cor. 7:10 is a quote from Gad, 5:7;
- Ephes. 5:6 appeared first in Naphtali, 3:1.

Later scholarship has highly debated this issue.

== Availability ==
A copy of the testaments is published in several works including:

- The Ante Nicene Fathers, Volume VIII
- The Apocrypha and Pseudepigrapha of the Old Testament in English, ed. Robert Henry Charles (Oxford Univ. Press 1913) volume 2 (pseudepigrapha)
- The Testaments of the Twelve Patriarchs translated from the Editor's Greek text, Robert Henry Charles (London, 1908)
- Ancient Testaments of the Patriarchs, by Ken Johnson
- The Lost Books of the Bible and the Forgotten Books of Eden.
- The Apocryphal Old Testament, ed. H.F.D. Sparks (1985, Oxford Univ. Press)
- Testaments of the Twelve Patriarchs (MS Ff.1.24), a 10th century Greek manuscript in the collections of Cambridge University Library
- The 120-Book Holy Bible and Apocrypha Collection: Literal Standard Version (LSV), Covenant Press (New York, 2023)

== See also ==
- Testament of Jacob
- Testament of Job
- Testament of Qahat

== Works cited ==
- This article, written by the author of the scholarly book cited below, contains a detailed exegesis of the Testaments.
- Charles, Robert Henry (1908). The Testaments of the Twelve Patriarchs, with introduction, notes, and indices. London: Adam and Charles Black.
- * Kugel, James (2006). The ladder of Jacob : ancient interpretations of the biblical story of Jacob and his children. Princeton, N.J: Princeton University Press. ISBN 978-0-691-12122-2. OCLC 698590791.
