= Issachar =

Biblical figure and son of Jacob and Leah

- יִשָּׂשכָר
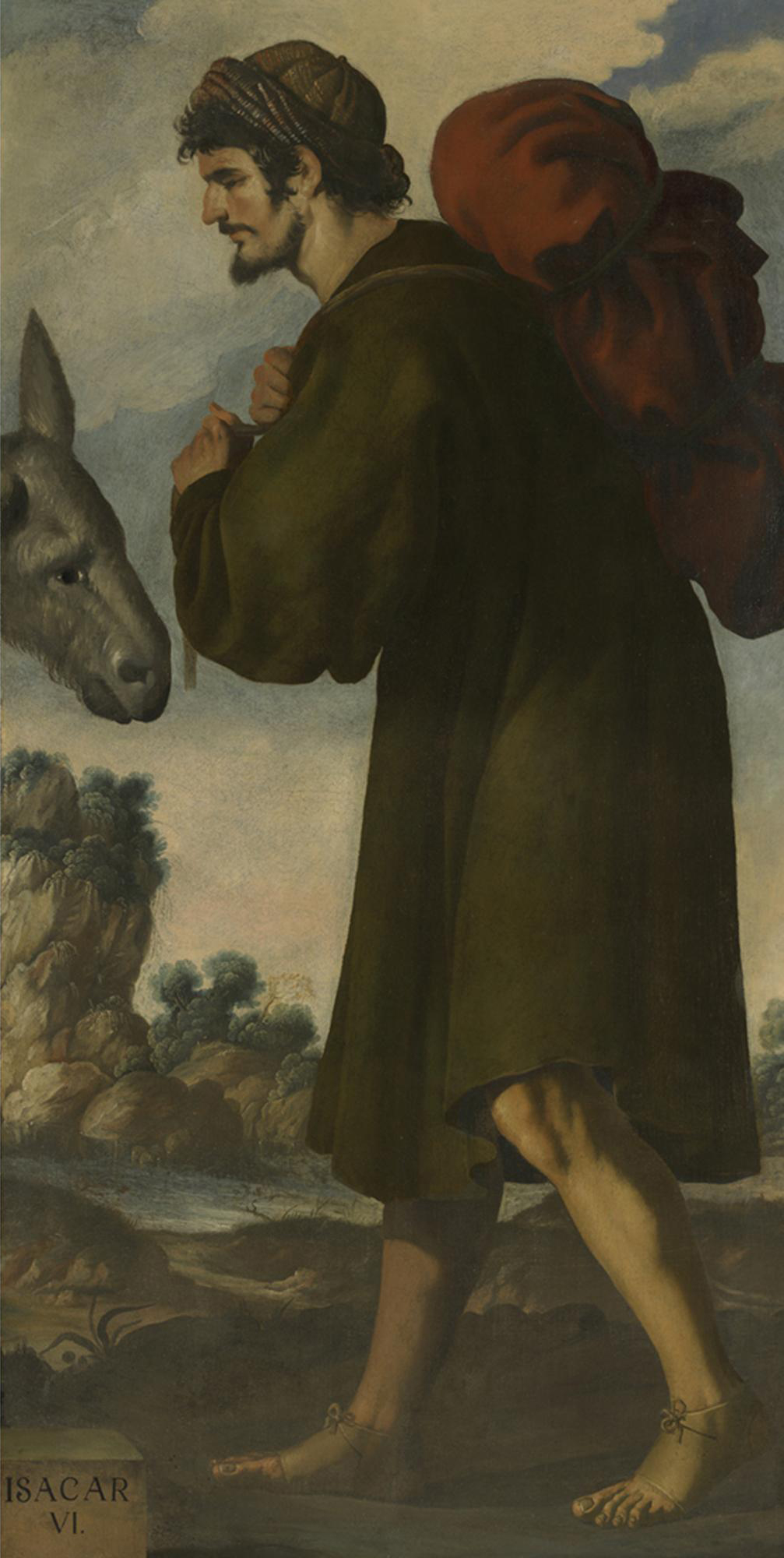
- Painting by Francisco de Zurbarán (from Jacob and his twelve sons, c. 1640–45)
- Pronunciation: /ˈɪ.səˌkɑːr/
- Born: 4 or 10 Av; Paddan Aram
- Died: (aged 122)
- Resting place: maybe in Sidon
- Spouse: Aridah
- Children: Tola (son); Puah (son); Jashub (son); Shimron (son)
- Parents: Jacob (father); Leah (mother)
- Relatives: Reuben (brother); Simeon (brother); Levi (brother); Judah (brother); Dan (half brother); Naphtali (half brother); Gad (half brother); Asher (half brother); Zebulun (brother); Dinah (sister); Joseph (half brother); Benjamin (half brother); Rachel (aunt/stepmother)

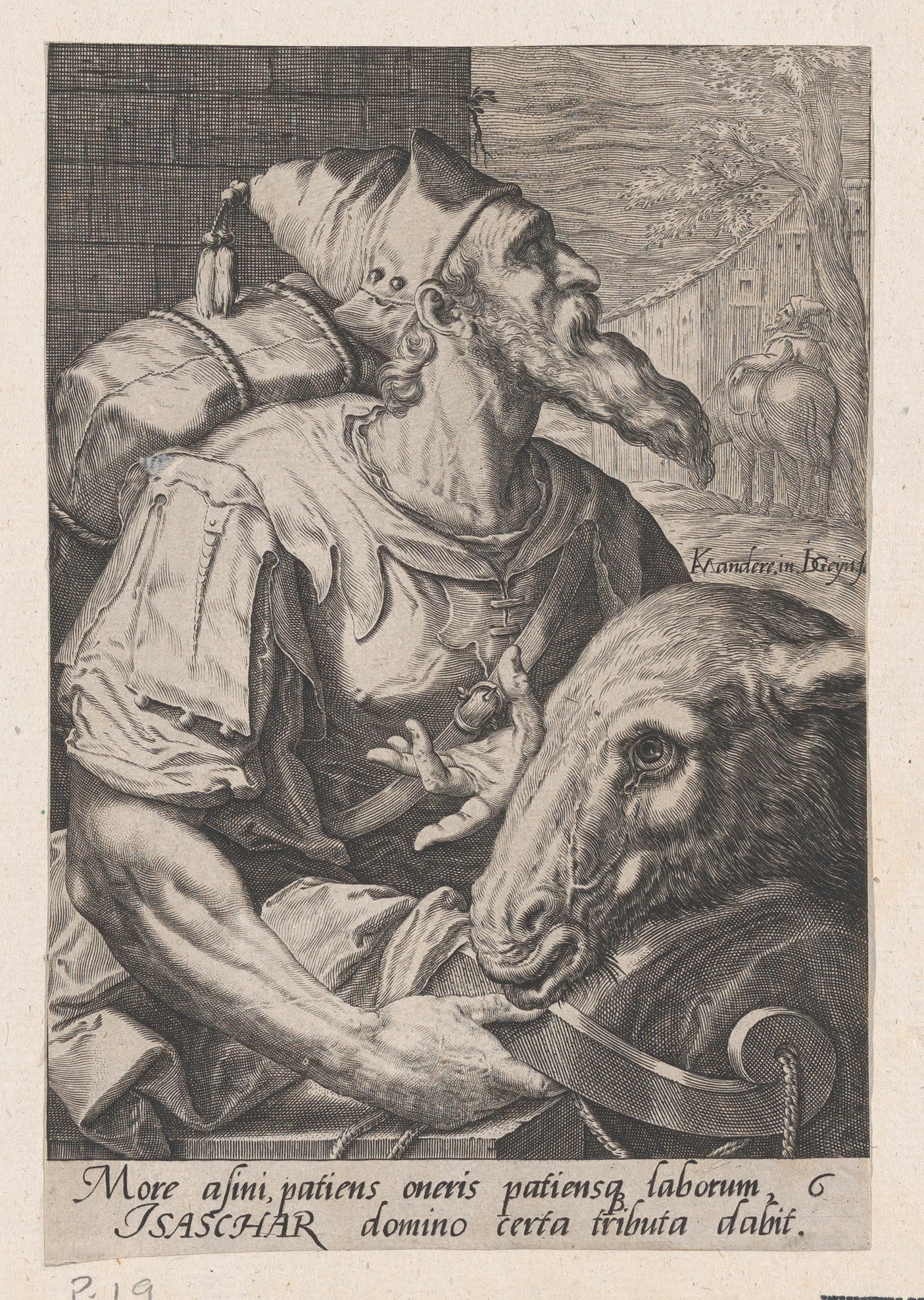
Isachar, from Jacques de Gheyn II's prints (c. 1584–94)

Issachar (Hebrew: יִשָּׂשכָר, romanized: Yiśśāḵār, lit. 'There is reward') was, according to the Book of Genesis, Jacob's ninth son, the fifth of the six sons of Jacob and Leah, and the founder of the Israelite Tribe of Issachar. However, some Biblical scholars view this as an eponymous metaphor providing an aetiology of the connectedness of the tribe to others in the Israelite confederation.

== Name ==
The story of Issachar's birth is linked to an account of some mandrakes which Reuben, Jacob's oldest son, had brought home. Rachel, Jacob's favourite wife, takes some of the mandrakes in exchange for giving Leah, his first wife, the opportunity to sleep with Jacob. Leah becomes pregnant and she gives her child the name "Issachar" in Genesis 30:18, where she states that "God has given me my wages for giving my maidservant to my husband". His name reflects the Hebrew words yesh sakar, meaning there is a reward. But the earlier verse Genesis 30:16 also has the Hebrew words ish sakar, meaning man of hire, in Leah's invitation to her husband: tonight, "you must have intercourse with me, because I have hired you with my son's mandrakes". Thus both verses 16 and 18 are seen by scholars as containing words which explain the derivation of the name "Issachar".

William F. Albright notes that the name Issachar finds a rich parallel in the name of a Semitic slave recorded in the Eighteenth Dynasty Egypt derived from the Semitic root ś-k-r "favorable, favor". The causative *Yašaśkir, which constitutes the protoform of "Issachar", would mean approximately "May (God) Grant Favor".

== Historical theories ==
Leah's status as the first wife of Jacob is regarded by biblical scholars looking at the biblical account as indicating that the authors saw the tribe of Issachar as being one of the original Israelite groups; however, this may have been the result of a scribal error, as the names of Issachar and Naphtali appear to have changed places elsewhere in the text, and the birth narrative of Issachar and Naphtali is regarded by textual scholars as having been spliced together from its sources in a manner which has highly corrupted the narrative.

== Rabbinical interpretations ==
In classical rabbinical literature, it is stated that Issachar was born on the fourth of Av, and lived 122 years. According to the midrashic Book of Jasher, Issachar married Aridah, the younger daughter of Jobab, a son of Joktan; the Torah states that Issachar had four sons, who were born in Canaan and migrated with him to Egypt, with their descendants remaining there until the Exodus. The midrashic Book of Jasher portrays Issachar as somewhat pragmatic, due to his strong effort in being more learned, less involved with other matters which led him to such actions like taking a feeble part in military campaigns involving his brothers, and generally residing in strongly fortified cities and, depending on his brother Zebulun's financial support in return for a share in the spiritual reward he gains.

The Talmud argues that Issachar's description in the Blessing of Jacob - Issachar is a strong ass lying down between two burdens: and he saw that settled life was good, and the land was pleasant; and bowed his shoulder to bear, and became a servant unto tribute - is a reference to the religious scholarship of the tribe of Issachar, though scholars feel that it may more simply be a literal interpretation of Issachar's name.

== In Islam ==
Some Muslim genealogists link Shuayb to Abraham through both Sarah and Keturah by making Shuayb's genealogy to be Shuayb b. Isaachar b. Midian b. Abraham.

== Tomb ==
A Samaritan tradition recorded in the late 19th century considered Neby Hazkil near Rameh to be the burial place of Issachar.

== See also ==
- Tribe of Issachar
- Sea Peoples
- Book of Chronicles
