= Dan (son of Jacob) =

Biblical figure and the fifth son of Jacob through his concubine Bilhah

- דָּן
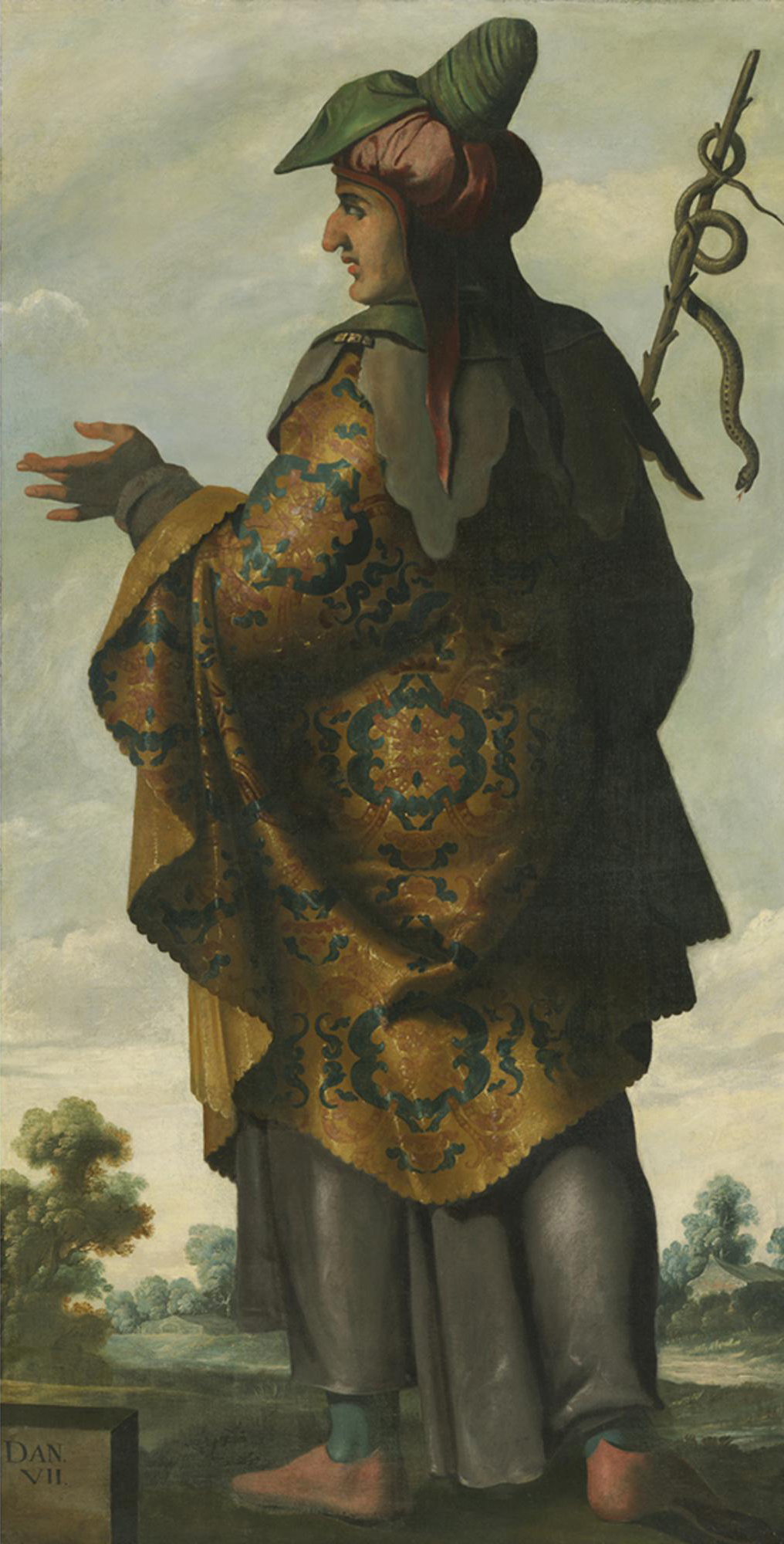
- Painting by Francisco de Zurbarán (from Jacob and his twelve sons, c. 1640–45)
- Spouse: Aphlaleth
- Children: Hushim (son)
- Parents: Jacob (father); Bilhah (mother)
- Relatives: Reuben (half brother); Simeon (half brother); Levi (half brother); Judah (half brother); Naphtali (brother); Gad (half brother); Asher (half brother); Issachar (half brother); Zebulun (half brother); Dinah (half sister); Joseph (half brother); Benjamin (half brother)

According to the Book of Genesis, Dan (Hebrew: דָּן, Dān, "judgment" or "he judged") was Jacob's fifth son and the first of the two sons of Jacob and Bilhah. His mother, Bilhah, was Rachel's handmaid, who became one of Jacob's concubines (Book of Genesis, Genesis 35:22). In the biblical narrative, he is the founder of the Israelite Tribe of Dan. He was the father of Hushim, according to Genesis 46:23, and Samson was a descendant of Dan.

== Name ==
The text of the Torah explains that the name of Dan derives from dananni, meaning "he has judged me", in reference to Rachel's belief that she had gained a child as the result of a judgment from God.

== Biblical references ==
Dan's birth is reported in Genesis 30:1-6. Jacob's first wife has four sons by this time, but Rachel, his second but "preferred" wife, has none and fears she may be barren. She suggests that Jacob takes her handmaid Bilhah as a concubine, and through this arrangement Bilhah gives birth to Dan and then to Naphtali, enabling Rachel to identify herself as their mother through the agency of her servant. It is Rachel who gives Dan his name, and who considers his birth as her divine vindication.

The narrative concerning Joseph from Genesis 37 onwards begins with Joseph pasturing his father's sheep with Dan, Naphtali, and Zilpah's sons, Gad and Asher, but not their other brothers.

Owing to the Book of Judges, in the account of Micah's Idol, describing the Tribe of Dan as having used ephod and teraphim in worship, and Samson (a member of the Tribe of Dan) being described as failing to adhere to the rules of a Nazarite, classical rabbinical writers concluded that Dan was very much a black sheep. In the Book of Jeremiah, the north of Canaan is associated with darkness and evil, and so rabbinical sources treated Dan as the archetype of wickedness.

John of Patmos omits the Tribe of Dan when mentioning the twelve tribes of the sons of Israel, in regard to the 144,000 sealed Israelites. Instead of Dan, the tribe of Joseph appears twice (being also represented by Manasseh).

== Later writings ==
In the apocryphal Testaments of the Patriarchs, Dan is portrayed as having hated Joseph, and having been the one who invented the idea of deceiving Jacob by the smearing of Joseph's coat with the blood of a kid. In the apocryphal Prayer of Asenath, Dan is portrayed as plotting with the Egyptian crown prince, against Joseph and Asenath. In the Blessing of Jacob, Dan is described as a serpent, which seems to have been interpreted as connecting Dan to Belial, a connection made, for example, in the apocryphal Testament of Dan.

Early Christian writers like Irenaeus and Hippolytus believed that the Antichrist would come from the Tribe of Dan.

H. E. Ryle notes that Dan and Naphtali, as Bilhah's children, are associated with Rachel's later-born children in tribal history.
