= Gad (son of Jacob) =

Biblical figure and son of Jacob and Zilpah

- גָּד
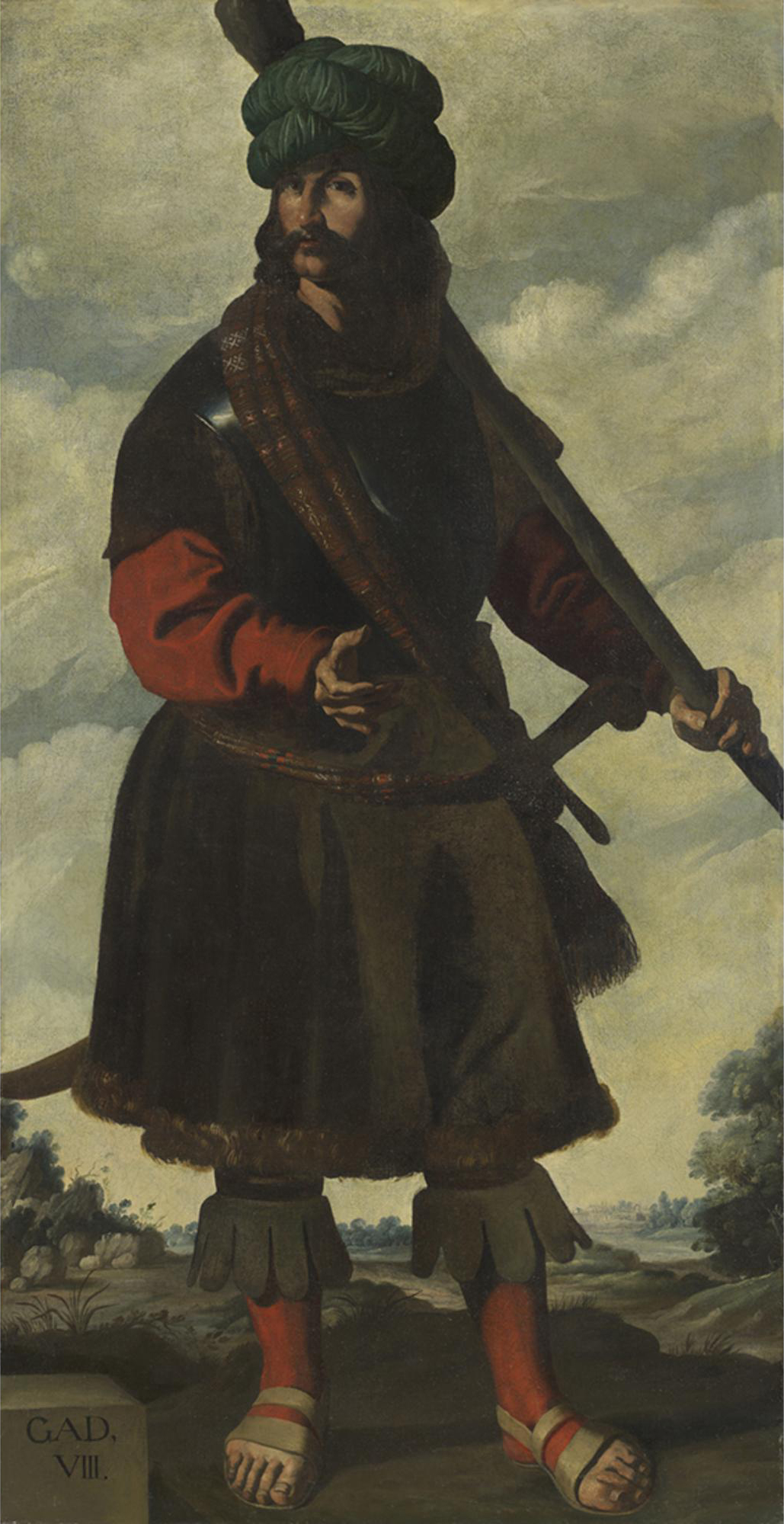
- Painting by Francisco de Zurbarán (from Jacob and his twelve sons, c. 1640–45)
- Pronunciation: Gad
- Born: 1564 BCE (12 Marcheshvan, 10 Tishrei, or 10 Marcheshvan, AM 2198)
- Died: (aged 125)
- Spouse: Uzith
- Children: Ziphion (son); Haggi (son); Shuni (son); Ezbon (son); Eri (son); Arodi (son); Areli (son)
- Parents: Jacob (father); Zilpah (mother)
- Relatives: Reuben (half brother); Simeon (half brother); Levi (half brother); Judah (half brother); Dan (half brother); Naphtali (half brother); Asher (brother); Issachar (half brother); Zebulun (half brother); Dinah (half sister); Joseph (half brother); Benjamin (half brother)

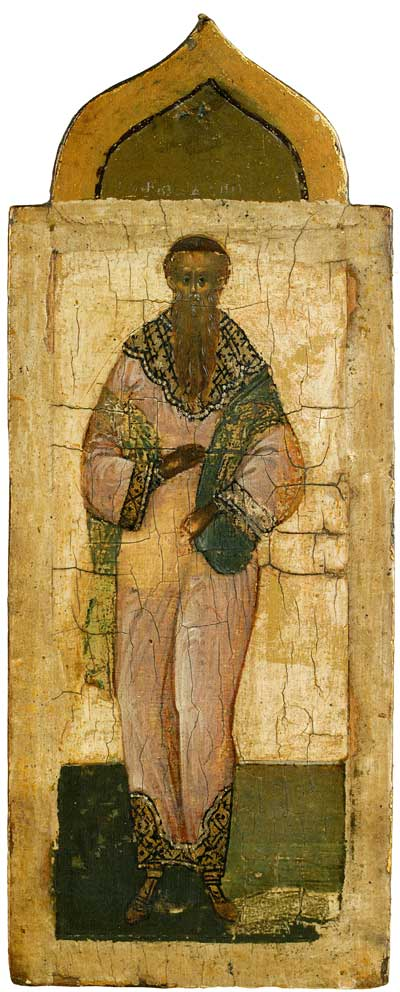
Russian icon

According to the Book of Genesis of Bible, Gad (Hebrew: גָּד, Modern: Gad, Tiberian: Gāḏ, "luck") is the first-born son of Zilpah and the seventh son of Patriarch Jacob. Gad is the founder of the Israelite tribe of Gad. The text of Genesis implies that the name Gad means "luck" or "fortunate", in Hebrew. R. N. Whybray suggests that Gad is "the name of a god of good fortune".

== Biblical narrative ==
The Biblical account records that Zilpah, Leah's handmaid, was offered to Jacob to provide him with more children after Leah had given birth to four sons and thought she would have no more children. Gad was Zilpah's first-born son, and Asher her second.

== Interpretation ==
Many scholars believe that Gad was a late addition to the Israelite confederation. Gad, by this theory, is assumed to have been a northwards-migrating nomadic tribe, at a time when the other tribes were quite settled in Canaan.

== Rabbinical sources ==
According to classical rabbinical literature, Gad was born on 10 Marcheshvan, and lived 125 years. These sources go on to state that, unlike his other brothers, Joseph did not present Gad to the Pharaoh, since Joseph did not want Gad to become one of Pharaoh's guards, an appointment that would have been likely had the Pharaoh realised that Gad had great strength.

== Book of Jasher ==
The Book of Jasher states that Gad married Uzith. Uzith was the daughter of Amuram, the granddaughter of Uz and the great-grandson of Nahor (son of Terah).

== Tomb ==
The Prophet Jadur Shrine in Al-Salt, Jordan, contains the tomb of Gad, known by Arabs and Muslims as Jadur. It has an elevation of 866 metres and is located in a cemetery.

== See also ==
- Tribe of Gad
- Gad (deity), pan-Semitic god of fortune
- Testament of Gad, apocryphal work
