= Bilhah =

Biblical character; handmaid

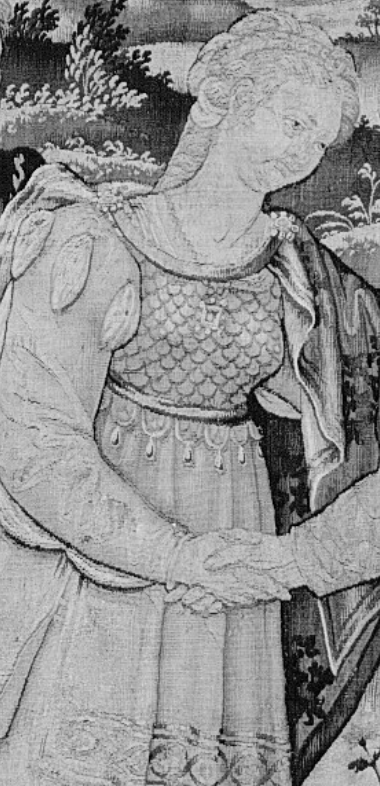
Bilhah - detail from Flemish tapestry made around 1550, depicting Rachel giving Bilhah to Jacob.

Bilhah (בִּלְהָה "unworried", Standard Hebrew: Bilha, Tiberian Hebrew: Bīlhā) is a woman mentioned in the Book of Genesis, initially as Laban's handmaiden (שִׁפְחָה), then as Rachel's handmaiden, who gives Bilhah to her husband Jacob as a concubine. Bilhah is the mother of Jacob's sons, Dan and Naphtali. (Note: For an etymology of Bilhah, see Holman 2007, p. 49)

== Biblical references ==
=== Roles as handmaiden and mother ===
Genesis 29:29 describes Bilhah as the handmaiden of Laban, who was given to his daughter Rachel to be her handmaid on Rachel's marriage to Jacob. When Rachel failed to have children, Rachel offered Bilhah to Jacob as a concubine to bear him children on her behalf. Bilhah gave birth to two sons, whom Rachel claimed as her own and named Dan and Naphtali. Genesis 35:22 expressly calls Bilhah Jacob's concubine, a pilegesh.

When Leah saw that she had stopped having children, she took her servant Zilpah and gave her to Jacob like a wife to bear him children as well.

=== Reuben's adultery with Bilhah ===
Reuben was Jacob's eldest son with Leah. Genesis 35:22 says, "And it came to pass, while Israel dwelt in that land, that Reuben went and lay with Bilhah his father's concubine; and Israel heard of it." As a result of this adultery, he lost the respect of his father, who said: "Unstable as water, you shall excel no longer; For when you mounted your father’s bed, You brought disgrace—my couch he mounted!"

== Apocryphal texts ==
The apocryphal Testament of Naftali says that Bilhah and Zilpah's father was named Rotheus. He was taken into captivity but redeemed by Laban, Rachel and Leah's father. Laban gave Rotheus a wife named Euna, who was the girls' mother. On the other hand, the early rabbinical commentary Pirkei De-Rabbi Eliezer and other rabbinic sources (Midrash Rabba and elsewhere) state that Bilhah and Zilpah were also Laban's daughters, through his concubines, which would make them half-sisters to Rachel and Leah. (Note: See also Pirke De-Rabbi Eliezer, xxxvi.) Scholars believe that these attempts to make Bilhah and Zilpah appear biologically related to Abraham's family were a result of anti-foreign views in the post-exilic period. It appears more likely that they were foreign like Tamar and Asenath, who were considered to be "secondary Matriarchs".

== Interpretation ==
Some rabbinical commentators interpreted the story of Reuben and Bilhah differently, saying that Reuben's disruption of Bilhah's and Jacob's beds was not through sex with Bilhah. As long as Rachel was alive, say these commentators, Jacob kept her bed in his tent. When Rachel died, Jacob moved Bilhah's bed into his tent, who had been mentored by Rachel, to retain a closeness to his favourite wife. However, Reuben, Leah's eldest, felt that this move slighted his mother, who was also a primary wife, and so he moved his mother's bed into Jacob's tent and removed or overturned Bilhah's. This invasion of Jacob's privacy was viewed so gravely that the Bible equates it with adultery, and lost Reuben his first-born right to a double inheritance.

H. E. Ryle suggests that the childlessness of Rachel, in response to which she offered Bilhah to Jacob, "should be compared with that of Sarah and Rebekah ... It is part of the discipline of the covenant".

Bilhah is said to have been buried in the Tomb of the Matriarchs in Tiberias.

== In popular culture ==
- In the novels The Red Tent by Anita Diamant and Rachel and Leah by Orson Scott Card, Bilhah and Zilpah are half-sisters of Leah and Rachel, born of different mothers, following the Talmudic tradition.
- In Margaret Atwood's speculative fiction novel The Handmaid's Tale, the theocratic society depicted cites the relationship between Bilhah, Rachel and Jacob as the scriptural basis for the role of handmaids as surrogates to high-ranking men and their infertile wives.

== Bilhah as a location ==
Bilhah is also a minor biblical place mentioned in the First Book of Chronicles: Shimei's brothers were said to have lived in a town called Bilhah and surrounding territories prior to the reign of David.
