= Laban (Bible) =

Biblical figure

- לָבָן
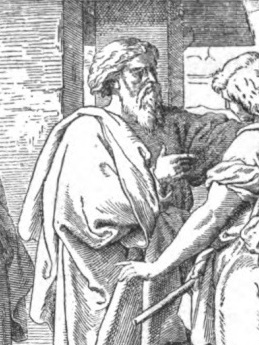
- Laban clashing with Jacob (1873)
- Born: Paddan Aram, Aram-Naharaim (present-day Harran, Turkey)
- Died: Paddan Aram, Aram-Naharaim (present-day Harran, Turkey)
- Spouse: Adinah
- Children: Leah; Rachel; Beor
- Father: Bethuel
- Relatives: Rebecca (sister)

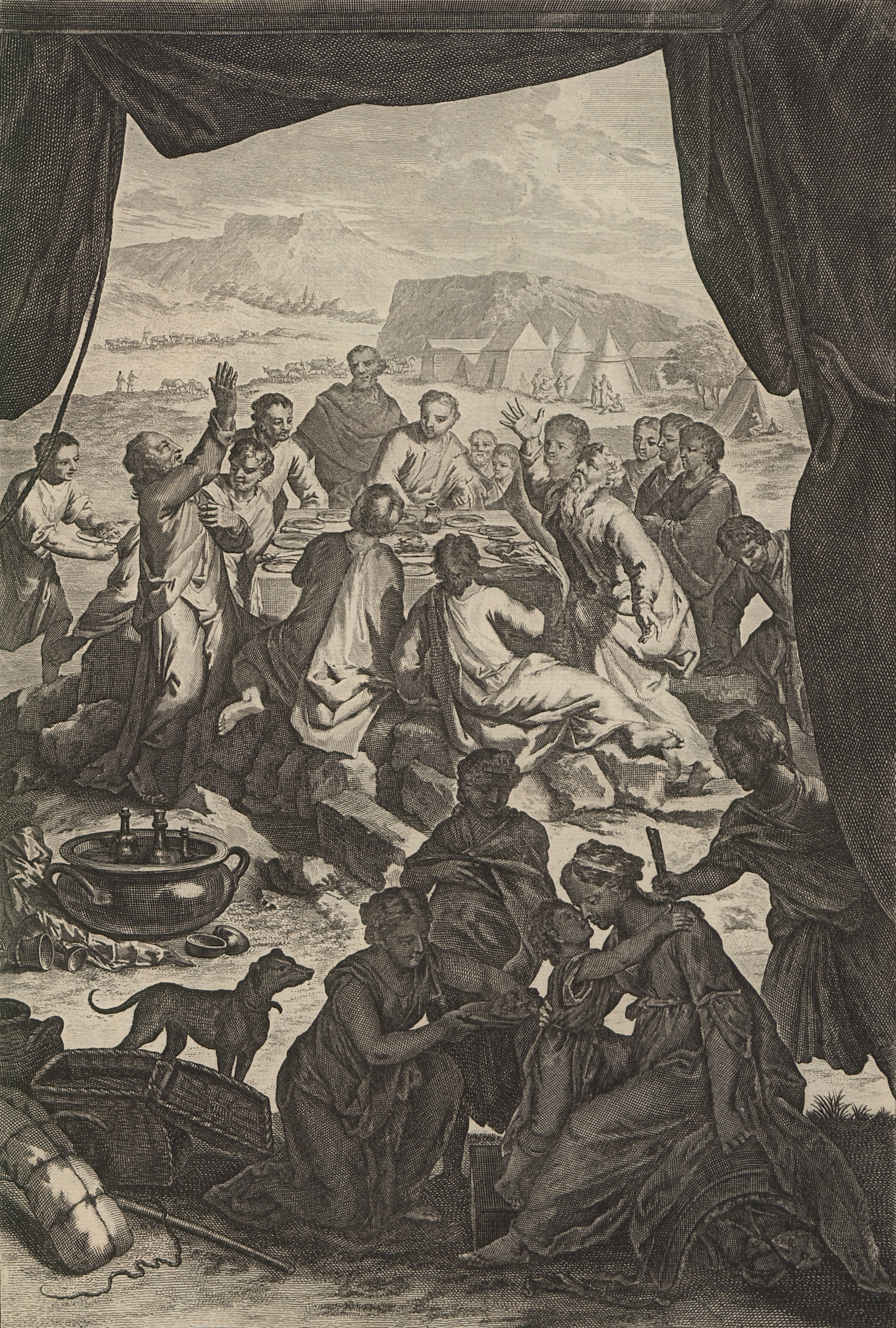
Laban and Jacob make a covenant together, as narrated in Genesis 31:44–54

Laban (Biblical Hebrew: לָבָן, romanized: Lāḇān, lit. 'White'), also known as Laban the Aramean, was a figure in the Book of Genesis in the Hebrew Bible. He was the brother of Rebekah, the woman who married Isaac and bore Jacob. Laban welcomed his nephew and set him the stipulation of seven years' labour before he permitted him to marry his daughter Rachel. Laban tricked Jacob into marrying his elder daughter Leah instead. Jacob then took Rachel as his second wife, on condition of serving an additional seven years' labour.

Laban and his family were described as dwelling in Paddan Aram, in Mesopotamia.

== Hebrew Bible ==
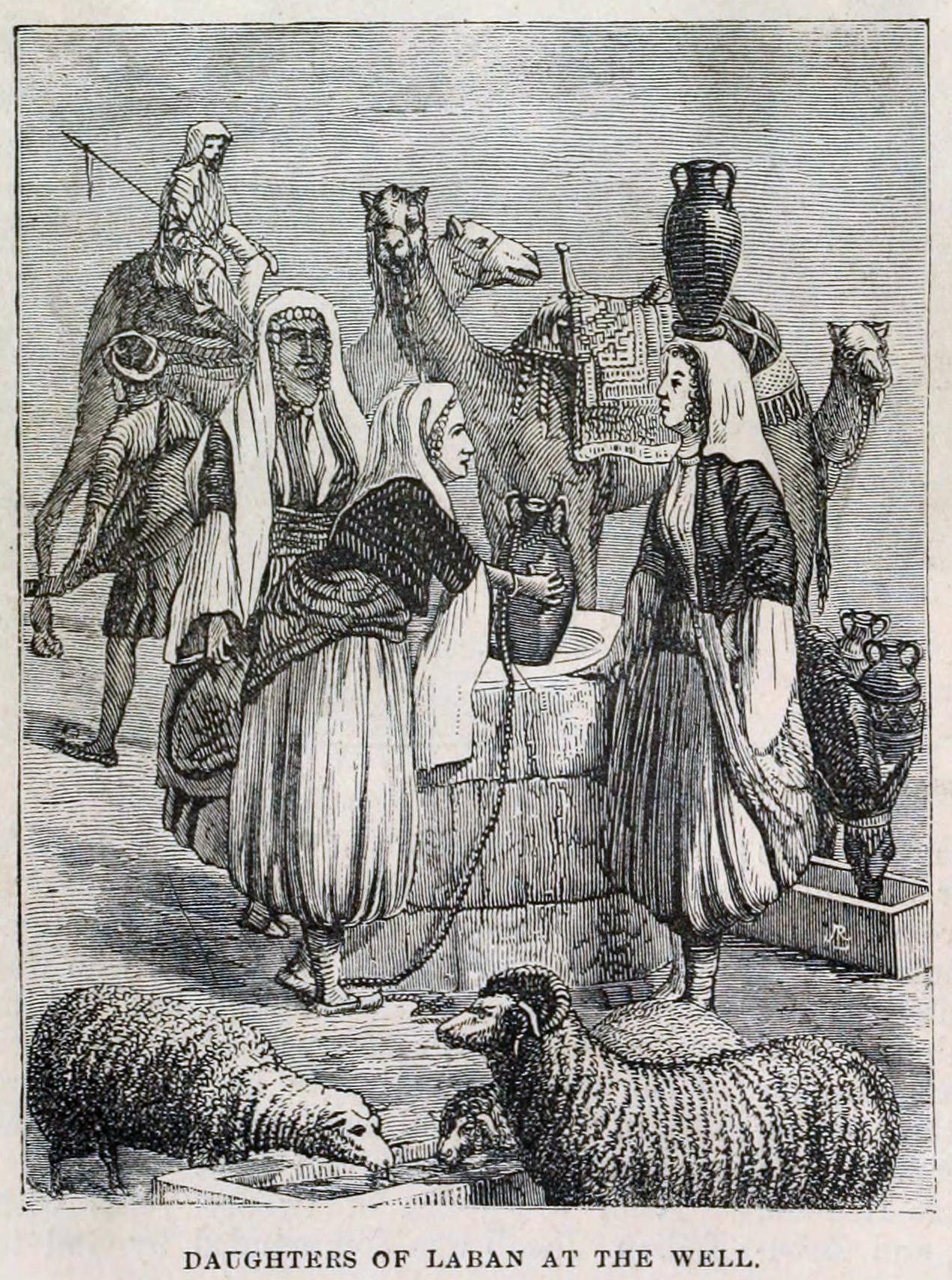
Daughters of Laban at the well

Laban first appears in the Hebrew Bible in Genesis 24:29–60 as the grown spokesman for his father Bethuel's house; he was impressed by the gold jewelry given to his sister on behalf of Isaac, and played a key part in arranging their marriage. Twenty years later, Laban's nephew Jacob was born to Isaac and Rebekah.

When grown, Jacob comes to work for Laban. The biblical narrative provides a framework for dating these events: Jacob begat Joseph 14 years after his flight to Laban; Joseph entered Pharaoh's service at age 30; and from that point, after seven years of plenty and two years of famine, Jacob met Pharaoh and stated his age as 130. Subtracting yields an age of 77 (Jacob at his flight to Laban). Laban was more than 30 years older than Jacob, and employed him for 20 years.

Laban promised his younger daughter Rachel to Jacob in return for seven years' service, only to trick him into marrying his elder daughter Leah instead. Jacob then served another seven years in exchange for the right to marry his choice, Rachel, as well (Genesis 29). Laban's flocks and fortunes increased under Jacob's skilled care, but there was much further trickery between them (Genesis 30:25–36). Six years after his promised service has ended, Jacob, having prospered largely by proving more cunning than his father-in-law, finally left. Laban pursued him, but they eventually parted on good terms (Genesis 31).

== Interpretations ==
Though the biblical text itself does not attest to this, rabbinic sources also identify Laban as the father of Bilhah and Zilpah, the two concubines with whom Jacob also has children. According to Seder HaDoroth, Laban's wife and the mother of Leah and Rachel was Adinah. Sefer haYashar reports that Laban was also the father of Beor the father of Balaam and Balaam's sons were Jannes and Jambres. Other Jewish traditions identify Laban as Kushan Rishatayim, king of Aram Nahariyim who oppressed the Jews in the era of the Judges and another Jewish tradition identifies Laban and Balaam as the same person—indeed, both were known for their sorcery. According to the Midrash, the wall against which Balaam's leg was crushed by his donkey was the very mound of stones from Laban and Jacob's covenant. By plotting to harm the Jews, Balaam was violating the covenant he had made to never harm Jacob's descendants.

Laban can be seen as symbolizing those whose concern for the welfare of their immediate family, nominally a virtue, is taken to the point where it has lasting negative ramifications. Laban's urge to ensure his older daughter not be left unmarried can be interpreted as leading to the Exile in Egypt; his anxiety over seeing his son-in-law throw away his family's comfortable position in Aram in search of a risky new beginning back in Canaan leads him to oppose the return of the Children of Israel to the Promised Land. His name can also be seen as symbolic in this matter: it means "white", the visual representation of purity, without visible stain, symbolizing those without apparent evil motives whose actions nevertheless result in undesirable outcomes.

== Laban and Passover ==
Laban is referenced significantly in the Passover Haggadah, in the context of the answer to the traditional child's question, "Why is this night different from all other nights?" The prescribed answer begins with a quote from אֲרַמִּי֙ אֹבֵ֣ד אָבִ֔י ʾarammi ʾob̲ēd̲ ʾāb̲i. Deuteronomy 26:5: normally translated as "a wandering Aramean was my father", alluding either to Abram or Jacob, but here interpreted unusually as "ibbed arammi eṯ-ʾāb̲i", "an Aramean destroyed my father", as made clear by the rabbinical exegesis read in the Seder:

Come and learn what Laban the Aramean sought to do our father Jacob. For Pharaoh issued his edict against only the males, but Laban sought to uproot all, as it is said, 'An Aramean would have destroyed my father, and he went down to Egypt and he became there a nation, great, mighty and populous.'

There may also be a play on words here, using arammi in two senses – as both arammi, "Aramean", and rama′i, "a deceiver", since Laban cheated Jacob (Genesis Rabbah 70:19). In this interpretation, arammi personifies the Israelites’ bitter enemy.

The question of what the connection is between the apparently disjoint tales of Laban and Pharaoh is interpreted in several ways by rabbinical authorities.

Azriel Hildesheimer explains in his Hukkat HaPesach that Laban was, in fact, the driving force of the entire Exile and Exodus saga. Rachel was Jacob's divinely intended wife and could hypothetically have given birth to Joseph as Jacob's firstborn with rights of primogeniture. In this counterfactual, Jacob's favoring Joseph's succession as the leader of the fledgling nation of Israel would have been seen as perfectly normal and fitting, given the customs of the time. No older brothers would have felt cheated and jealous, and Joseph would not have been sold into slavery. Thus, there would have been no need for Jacob's family to be sent to Egypt to unite with Joseph.

In actuality, Laban married Jacob to Leah first, causing Leah's sons to precede Joseph in birth order. As a result, they felt justifiably outraged when their father seemed to violate societal norms by treating his second-youngest son as his heir, in preference to his older sons' natural and legal rights. In this way, Laban can be seen as "seeking to uproot all", by attempting to sever the family tree of the Patriarchs between Jacob and Joseph before the Israelites could become more than a single small family.

Devora Steinmetz, assistant professor of Talmud at the Jewish Theological Seminary of America, says that the story of Jacob and Laban also resonates with the covenant with Abraham, more frequently interpreted as applying to the Exodus: "your seed shall be a stranger in a land that is not theirs, and shall serve them and they shall afflict them ... Afterward they shall come out with great wealth" (Genesis 15:13–16). Jacob lived in the strange land of Aram, served Laban, and was afflicted by him; then he left with great wealth and returned to the Promised Land. The story thus serves to reinforce one of the central messages of the Haggadah: that the cycle of exile, persecution, and return recurs again and again, linking the observant Jew in the diaspora to the Holy Land.
