= Anita Diamant =

American writer (born 1951)

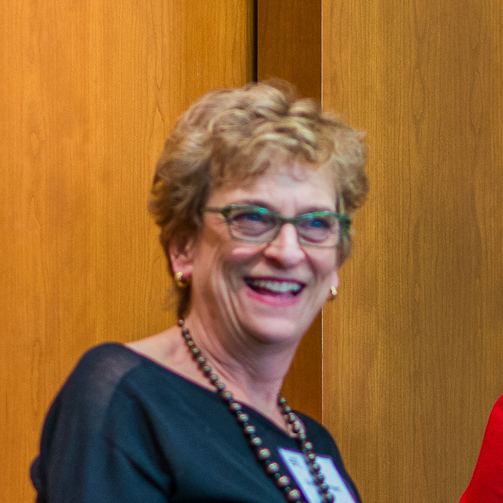
- Anita Diamant in 2018
- Born: June 27, 1951 (age 75)
- Education: University of Colorado Boulder; Washington University in St. Louis; Binghamton University
- Occupation: Writer
- Website: anitadiamant.com

Anita Diamant (born June 27, 1951) is an American journalist and writer of fiction and non-fiction books.

She has published five novels, the most recent of which is The Boston Girl, a New York Times best seller. She is known for her 1997 novel The Red Tent, which eventually became a best seller and book club favorite. She has also written six guides to contemporary Jewish practice, including The New Jewish Wedding, Living a Jewish Life, and The New Jewish Baby Book, as well as a collection of personal essays, Pitching My Tent: On Marriage, Motherhood, Friendship, and Other Leaps of Faith.

== Early life and education ==
Diamant spent her early childhood in Newark, New Jersey, and moved to Denver, Colorado, when she was twelve years old. She attended the University of Colorado Boulder and transferred to Washington University in St. Louis, where she earned a bachelor's degree in comparative literature in 1973. She then earned a master's degree in English from Binghamton University in 1975.

== Career ==
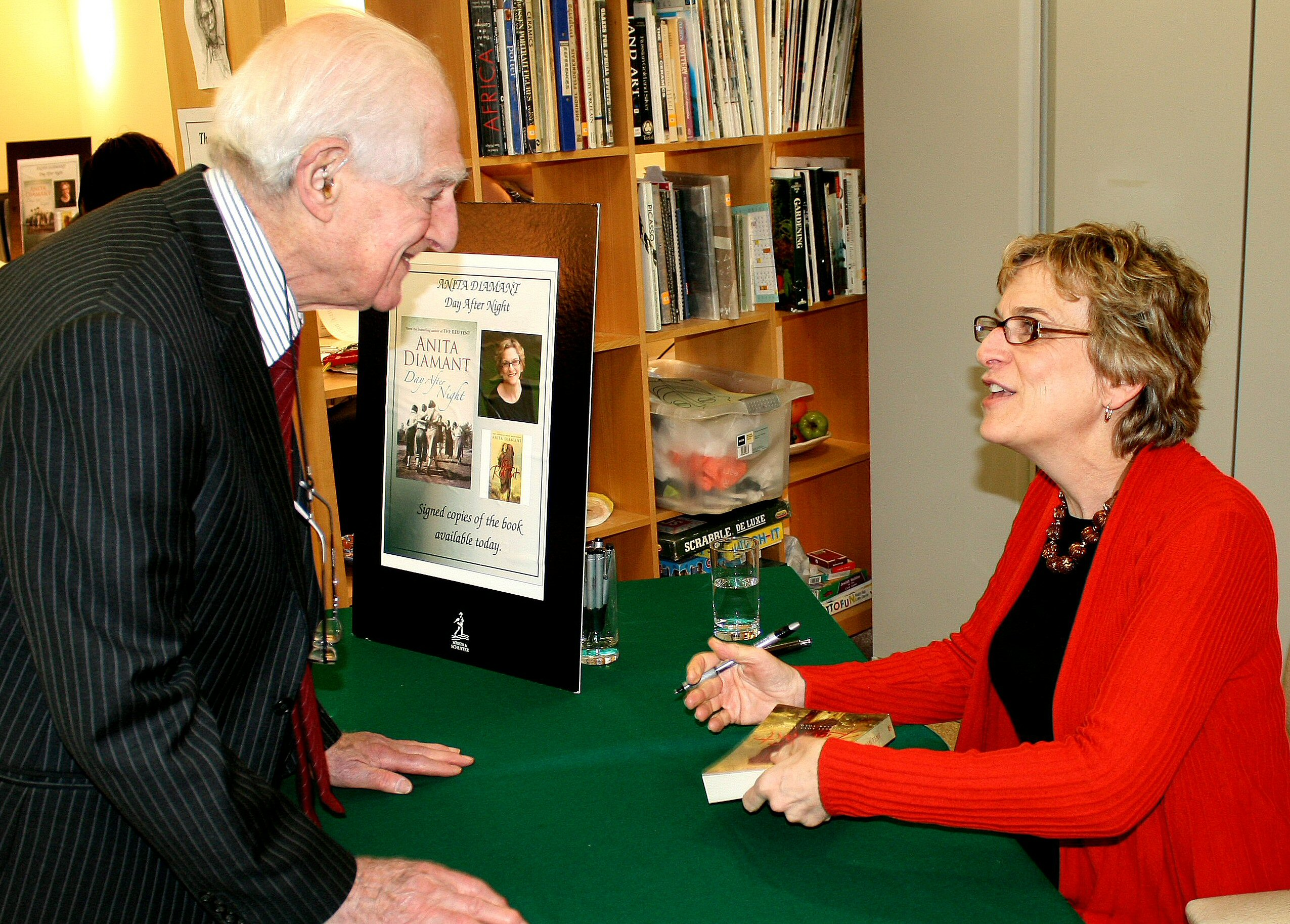
Anita Diamant at a book signing at Nightingale House, London, March 2010

Diamant started her writing career in 1975 as a freelance journalist. Her articles have been published in The Boston Globe newspaper as well as in magazines, including Parenting, New England Monthly, Yankee, Self magazine, Parents, McCall's, and Ms.

Her first book was The New Jewish Wedding, published in 1985 and updated in 2022 as The Jewish Wedding Now. She has also published five other guidebooks about contemporary Jewish practice: The New Jewish Baby Book, Living a Jewish Life, Choosing a Jewish Life, and How to Raise a Jewish Child.

Her debut as a fiction writer came in 1997 with The Red Tent, an international bestseller. Other novels followed, including Good Harbor and The Last Days of Dogtown. The latter is an account of life in a dying Cape Ann, Massachusetts, village, Dogtown, in the early 19th century.

The novel Day after Night (2009) tells the stories of four female survivors of The Holocaust who, in the period following the end of the war and before the founding of the State of Israel, find themselves detained in the Atlit detainee camp, just south of Haifa, in the what was then Mandatory Palestine.

== Personal life ==
Diamant is the founding president of Mayyim Hayyim: Living Waters Community Mikveh and Education Center, a community-based mikveh in Newton, Massachusetts.

She lives in Brookline, Massachusetts, is married, and has one daughter.

== Diamant's works ==
=== Novels ===
- The Red Tent (1997)
- Good Harbor (2001)
- The Last Days of Dogtown (2005)
- Day after Night (2009)
- The Boston Girl (2014)

=== Nonfiction ===
- Period. End of Sentence: The New Chapter in the Fight for Menstrual Justice (2021)

==== Autobiography ====
- Pitching My Tent: On Marriage, Motherhood, Friendship, and Other Leaps of Faith (2003)

==== Guides ====
- The Jewish Wedding Now" (2017, revised edition of "The New Jewish Wedding published in 1985 and revised 2001)
- The New Jewish Baby Book (1988, revised 2005)
- What to Name Your Jewish Baby (1989)
- Living a Jewish Life (1991, revised 2007, with Howard Cooper)
- Bible Baby Names: Spiritual Choices from Judeo-Christian Sources (1996)
- Saying Kaddish: How to Comfort the Dying, Bury the Dead, and Mourn as a Jew (1998, Revised 2019)
- Choosing a Jewish Life: A Handbook for People Converting to Judaism and for Their Family and Friends (Revised, 2020, first published 1998)
- How to Raise a Jewish Child: A Practical Handbook for Family Life (2000, with Karen Kushner)

== See also ==
- List of American novelists
- List of Binghamton University alumni
- List of Jewish American authors
- List of people from Massachusetts
- List of people from Newark, New Jersey
- List of University of Colorado Boulder alumni
- List of Washington University alumni
- List of women writers
