= Zilpah =

Leah's handmaid in the Book of Genesis

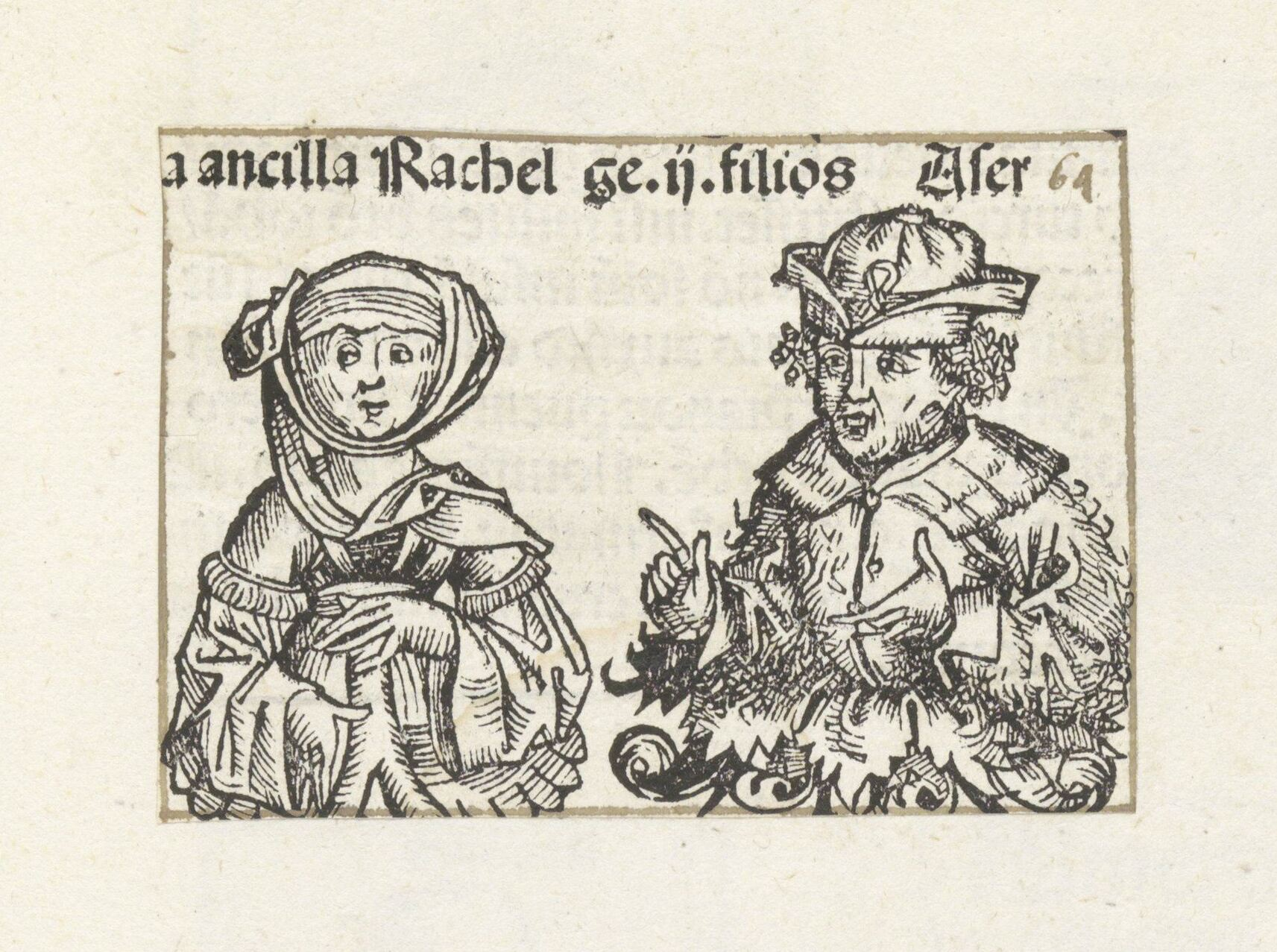
Zilpah alongside her son Asher

In the Book of Genesis, Zilpah (Hebrew: זִלְפָּה Zīlpā, meaning uncertain) was Leah's handmaid whom Leah gave to Jacob like a wife to bear him children (Genesis 30:9). Zilpah gave birth to two sons, whom Leah claimed as her own and named Gad and Asher (Genesis 30:10–13).

== Biblical narrative ==
Zilpah was given to Leah as a handmaid by Leah's father, Laban, upon Leah's marriage to Jacob (see Genesis 29:24, 46:18).

Zilpah also figured in the competition between Jacob's wives to bear him sons. Leah stopped conceiving after the birth of her fourth son. At this point Rachel, who had not yet borne any children, offered her handmaid, Bilhah, to Jacob like a wife in order to have children through her. After Bilhah bore two sons and Leah thought she would have no more children, the latter took up the same idea and presented Zilpah to Jacob, so she could have more children through her handmaid. Leah named the two sons of Zilpah and was directly involved in their upbringing.

== Commentary ==
According to the early rabbinical commentary Pirke De-Rabbi Eliezer, Zilpah and Bilhah, the handmaids of Leah and Rachel, respectively, were actually daughters of Laban and one or more of his concubines, but modern scholars believe that Zilpah and Bilhah were most likely foreign, like Tamar and Asenath.

According to Rashi, an 11th-century commentator, Zilpah was younger than Bilhah, "so young in years that her pregnancy was not noticed", and Laban's decision to give her to Leah was part of the deception he used to trick Jacob into marrying Leah, who was older than Rachel. The morning after the wedding, Laban explained to Jacob, "This is not done in our place, to give the younger before the older" (Genesis 29:26). But at night, to mask the deception, Laban gave the veiled bride the younger of the handmaids, so Jacob would think that he was really marrying Rachel, the younger of the sisters.

In Jewish tradition, Zilpah is believed to be buried in the Tomb of the Matriarchs in Tiberias.

== In popular culture ==
In the novel The Red Tent by Anita Diamant, Zilpah and Bilhah are represented as half-sisters of Leah and Rachel by different mothers.
