= Samuel of Nehardea =

Babylonian rabbi (c.165-c.254)

- שמואל
- Title: Rabbi, Amora

Personal life
- Born: 165 CE Nehardea, Babylonia
- Died: 254 CE Nehardea, Babylonia
- Parent: Abba bar Abba (father)
- Known for: Teacher of halakha, judge, physician, astronomer

Religious life
- Religion: Judaism
- Temple: Yeshiva at Nehardea

Jewish leader
- Teacher: Levi ben Sisi, Hanina bar Hama
- Students: Rav Yehuda

Samuel of Nehardea or Samuel bar Abba, often simply called Samuel (Hebrew: שמואל) and occasionally Mar Samuel, was a Jewish Amora of the first generation; son of Abba bar Abba and head of the Yeshiva at Nehardea, Babylonia. He was a teacher of halakha, judge, physician, and astronomer. He was born about 165 CE at Nehardea, and died there in 254 CE. In the Talmud, Samuel is frequently associated with Abba Arikha ("Rav"), with whom he debated on many issues.

== Biography ==
=== Birth ===
As in the case of many other great men, a number of legendary stories are connected with his birth.

His father, Abba bar Abba, subsequently known also by the Aramaic language designation Abuh di-Shemu'el ("father of Samuel"), was a silk-merchant. R. Yehuda ben Betheira ordered a silken garment from him, but refused to take it after Abba had procured it, and when the latter asked him the reason of his refusal, R. Yehuda answered, "The commission was only a spoken word, and was not sufficient to make the transaction binding." Abba thereupon said, "Is the word of a sage not a better guarantee than his money?" "You are right," said R. Yehuda; "and because you lay so much stress upon a given word you shall have the good fortune of having a son who shall be like the prophet Samuel, and whose word all Israel will recognize as true." Soon afterward a son was born to Abba, whom he named Samuel.

=== Youth ===
Even as a boy Samuel displayed rare ability. His first teacher was an otherwise unknown man, and Samuel, who knew more about a certain legal question than did his teacher, would not submit to ill treatment by him. Then Samuel's father, who was himself a prominent teacher of the Law, recognized as such even by Rav, undertook to instruct the boy. As he seems to have been unequal to this task he sent him to Nisibis to attend the school of the rabbi who had predicted the boy's birth, that he might there acquire a knowledge of the Law. Samuel seems to have remained only a short time at Nisibis. On his return to Nehardea he studied under Levi ben Sisi, who was in Babylonia before the death of Yehuda Ha-Nasi, and who exerted a great influence on Samuel's development. Samuel made such rapid progress and became so proficient in his studies that he soon associated as an equal with his teacher.

=== Training ===
Apart from the Bible and the traditional Law, which were usually the only subjects of study of the Jewish youth of that time, Samuel was instructed, probably in his early youth, in other sciences. It is likely that he accompanied his father on the latter's journey to Israel; for after his teacher Levi ben Sisi had gone to Israel there was no one in Babylon with whom he could have studied. According to an account in the Talmud, Samuel is said to have cured R. Yehuda Ha-Nasi of an eye disease. Although Samuel was at that time too young to study directly under R. Yehuda, he studied under the pupils of the patriarch, especially with Hanina bar Hama.

After having acquired a great store of knowledge in the Land of Israel, his studies there including the Mishnah edited by R. Yehuda haNasi as well as the other collections of tradition, Samuel left the Holy Land, probably with his father, and returned to his native city. His reputation as a teacher of the Law having preceded him, many pupils gathered about him. As he was especially well versed in civil law, the exilarch Mar Ukva, who was his pupil, appointed him judge of the bet din at Nehardea, where he was associated with his friend the learned and clever Karna. This court was regarded at that time as the foremost institution of its kind. In Israel, as well as in Babylon, Samuel and Karna were called the "judges of the Diaspora" (dayyanei Golah). Upon the death of Rav Shela, the director of the academy ("resh sidra") of Nehardea, Samuel was appointed to the office, after it had been refused by Rav, who would not accept any post of honor at Nehardea, Samuel's home. The Academy of Nehardea entered upon a brilliant phase of its existence under Samuel's directorate, and, with the academy founded by Rav at Sura, enjoyed a high general reputation.

=== Precursor of the exilarch ===
Rav at Sura and Samuel at Nehardea established the intellectual independence of Babylonian Jewry. Young men taking up the study of the Law there were no longer obliged to go to Israel, since they had the foremost teachers at home. Babylon now came to be regarded, in a sense, as a second Holy Land. Samuel taught, "As it is forbidden to migrate from Israel to Babylon, so is it forbidden to migrate from Babylon to other countries". After Rav's death no new director was elected, and Rav's greatest pupil, R. Huna, who became president of the court of Sura, subordinated himself to Samuel in every respect, asking his decision in every difficult religio-legal question.

The Academy of Nehardea was now the only one in Babylon, and its director, Samuel, who survived Rav about ten years, was regarded as the highest authority by the Babylonian Jews. Even Rabbi Yochanan, the most prominent teacher in Israel, and who at first looked upon Samuel merely as a colleague, became so convinced of his greatness, after Samuel had sent him a large number of responsa on important ritual laws, that he exclaimed, "I have a teacher in Babylon".

According to the Jewish Encyclopedia, his son Rabbah bar Samuel was a second-generation Amora quoted throughout the Bavli. His two daughters were captured by soldiers during the war with the Romans. They were taken to Tzippori, in Israel, where they were ransomed by coreligionists, but both died at an early age after having been married successively to a relative. The esteem in which Samuel was held appears from the fact that no one thought of attributing his misfortune to any sin committed by him; it was explained rather as being in consequence of some offense committed in Babylon by R. Hananya, the nephew of R. Yehoshua. After his death, Samuel was glorified in legend.

He was the teacher of Rabbi Yehuda ben Yehezkel. Despite his status, Samuel was never ordained as a Tanna.

== Teachings ==
Samuel amplified and expanded earlier legal theories and originated many new legal maxims. He formulated the important halakhic principle that "the law of the kingdom is [binding] law. This principle made it a religious duty for the Jews to obey the laws of the country. Thus, although the Jews had their own civil courts, Samuel thought that the Persian law should be taken into account and that various Jewish regulations should be modified according to it. Due to his loyalty to the government and his friendship with the Sassanid king, Shapur I, Samuel was called Shabur Malka. Fürst and Rapoport refer, each differently, the name of Aryok, given to Samuel, to his close relations with the Neo-Persians and their king. Older commentators explain this name without reference to such relations.

As a man, Samuel was distinguished for his modesty, gentleness, and unselfishness, being always ready to subordinate his own interests to those of the community. He said: "A man may never exclude himself from the community, but must seek his welfare in that of society". He was known for being very precise with his words. He demanded seemly behavior from every one, saying that any improper conduct was punishable by law. One should help one's fellow man at the first signs of approaching difficulties, so as to prevent them, and not wait until he is in actual distress. In his solicitude for helpless orphans he imposed upon every court the task of acting as father to them, and he declared that a loan taken from an orphan was not canceled in the Sabbatical year, even if no prozbul had been made out for it. He stored his grain until prices had risen, in order to sell it to the poor at the low prices of the harvest-time. In order to save the people from being cheated he ordered the merchants never to take a profit of more than one-sixth of the cost price, and he was ready even to temporarily modify the Law in order to prevent them from selling at a high price goods necessary for the fulfillment of a religious duty. In a certain case also he permitted the infraction of a religious prescription in order to keep people from harm.

Samuel was very modest in his associations with others, openly honoring any one from whom he had gained any knowledge. He never obstinately insisted on his own opinion, but yielded as soon as he was convinced of being in error. He was friendly to all men, and declared: "It is forbidden to deceive any man, be he Jew or pagan". "Before the throne of the Creator there is no difference between Jews and pagans, since there are many noble and virtuous among the latter". He taught that the dignity of womanhood should be respected even in the slave: the slave is given to the master only as a servant, and the master has no right to treat her with condescension or to have marital relations in the presence of the slaves. Once, when a female slave had been taken away from Samuel and he had unexpectedly recovered her by paying a ransom, he felt obliged to liberate her because he had given up hope of recovering her.

=== Aggadah ===
Following the example of his teacher Levi ben Sisi, Samuel collected the traditions handed down to him. His collection of baraitot, called "Tanna debei Shemu'el" in the Talmud, was noted for its correctness and trustworthiness, although it was not held in such high esteem as were the collections of R. Hiyya and R. Hoshaiah. Samuel did much to elucidate the Mishnah, both by his textual explanations and by his precise paraphrasing of ambiguous expressions and his references to other traditions. He is chiefly important, however, because of his promulgation of new theories and his independent decisions both in ritual and in civil law. However, in the field of ritual law he was not considered as great an authority as his colleague Rav, and practical questions were always decided according to Rav's views as against those of Samuel. In civil law his authority was the highest in Babylon, and his decisions became law even when contrary to Rav's.

== Scientific knowledge ==
Samuel seems to have possessed a thorough knowledge of the science of medicine as it was known in his day; this is evident from many of his medical maxims and dietetic rules scattered through the Talmud. He energetically opposed the view then current, even in intelligent circles, that most diseases were due to the evil eye, declaring that the source of all disease must be sought in the noxious influence exercised by the air and the climate upon humans. He traced many diseases to lack of cleanliness, and others to disturbances of the regular mode of living. He claimed to possess cures for most diseases, and was especially skillful in treating the eye; he discovered an eye-salve which was known as the "killurin [κολλύριον] of Mar Samuel," although he himself said that bathing the eyes with cold water in the morning and bathing hands and feet with warm water in the evening were better than all the eye-salves in the world. Samuel discovered also a number of the diseases of animals. He sometimes drew the figure of a palm branch as his signature, although perhaps this was used by physicians generally at that time as a sign of their profession.

Samuel had a special affinity for astronomy. From the scattered references in the Talmud it is impossible to determine exactly his proficiency in astronomy; but he knew how to solve many mathematics problems and how to explain many phenomena. He says himself: "Although I am as familiar with the courses of the stars as with the streets of Nehardea, I cannot explain the nature or the movements of the comets". Samuel devoted himself especially to that branch of applied astronomy that deals with calendric science, which he taught to his colleagues and pupils. His studies of the moon enabled him to predict the beginning of the month as it was determined in Israel, and he claimed to be able to remove the necessity of celebrating double holy days in the Diaspora. He also computed a Hebrew calendar for sixty years, which he subsequently sent to R. Yohanan, the head of the Israeli teachers, as a proof of his knowledge. He was called "Yarkhina'ah" or "Yarkhinai" (Hebrew: שמואל ירחינאה; "yerakh" = "month") because of this familiarity with calendric science and this ability to determine independently the beginning of the month. According to Krochmal "Shoḳed," another name given to Samuel, means "astronomer". But Hoffmann's view that "Shoḳed" means "the watchful, diligent one" is more likely correct. This name is said to have been given to Samuel because, despite his medical and astronomic studies, he devoted himself to the study of the Law.

== Relations with the Persian court ==
It was due to Mar Samuel's influence with the Persian king that the Jews were granted many privileges. On one occasion Samuel even made his love for his own people subsidiary to his loyalty to the Persian king and to his strict view of the duties of a citizen; for when the news came that the Persians, on capturing Mazaca, had killed 12,000 Jews who had obstinately opposed them, Samuel refrained from displaying any sorrow. It is worth noting that Samuel formulated the Talmudic dictum that "the law of the state is to be upheld" (Hebrew: דינא דמלכותא דינא).

R' Yitzhak HaLevi Herzog disagrees with that interpretation. First, Samuel intended to demonstrate a Law not his emotions on the subject. Second, Samuel held that the Messianic Era would arrive through natural means. Samuel may have believed that King Shapur I was destined to usher in the 3rd temple era as Cyrus had been before him. Therefore, those Jews who fought on the side of the Roman Emperor Julian were prolonging the exile and not worthy of being mourned.

But he had a great love for his people, and he loyally cherished the memory of the former kingdom of Judah. Once, when one of his contemporaries adorned himself with a crown of olive, Samuel sent him the following message: "The head of a Jew that now wears a crown while Jerusalem lies desolate, deserves to be separated from its trunk". Samuel declared that "There will be no difference between this world and the messianic age, except for [the ending of] subjugation [of Israel] to [foreign] kingdoms".

== Quotes ==
- Anyone who disqualifies another, does so in the very malady with which he, himself, is plagued!
