= Cave of the Patriarchs =

Holy site in Hebron, Palestine

- מְעָרַת הַמַּכְפֵּלָה (Hebrew) الحرم الإبراهيمي (Arabic) المسجد الإبراهيمي (Arabic)
- Tomb of the Patriarchs, Cave of Machpelah, Sanctuary of Abraham, Ibrahimi Mosque (Mosque of Abraham)
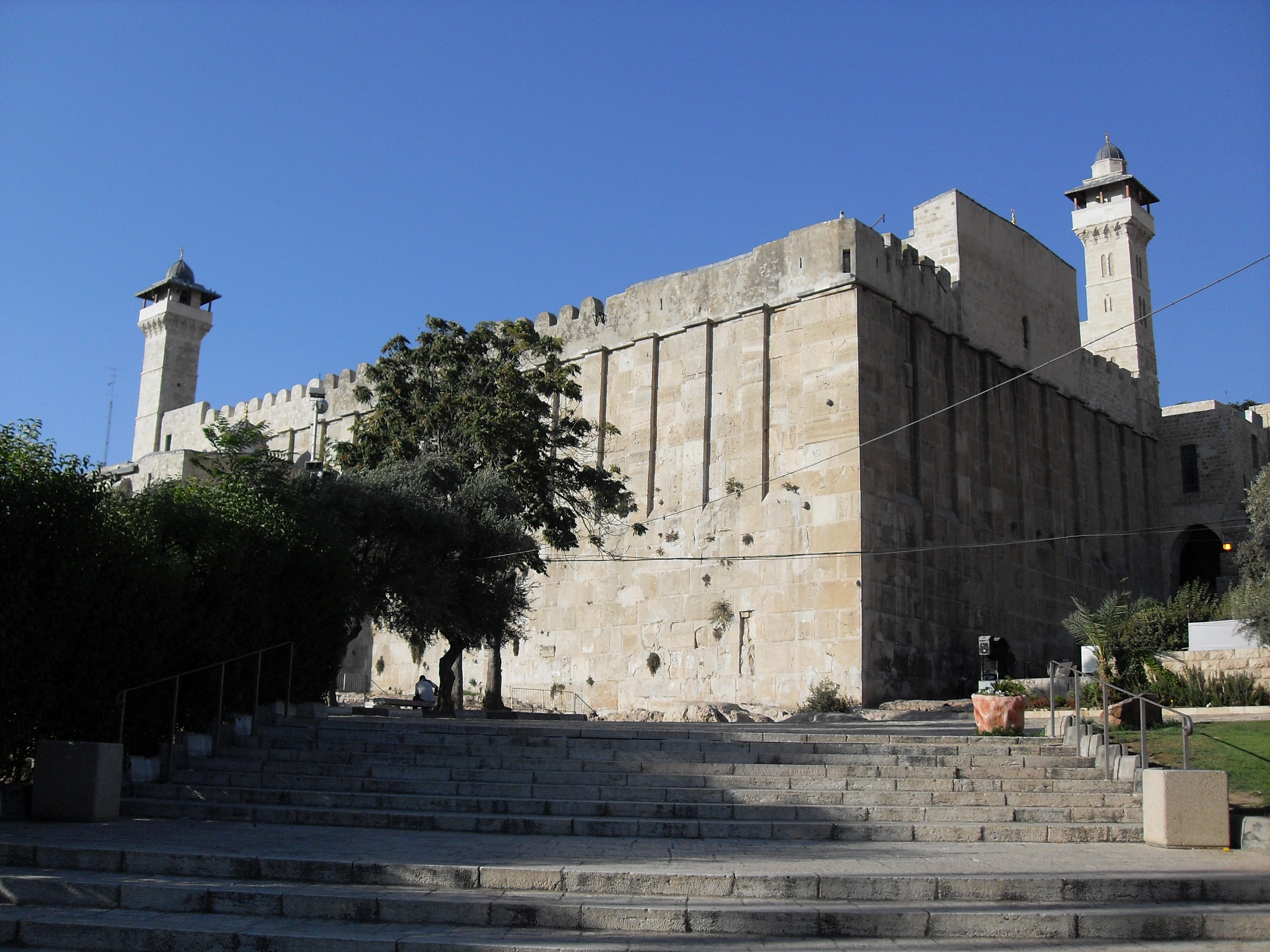
- Southern view of the complex, 2009

- Location within the West Bank Location within the State of Palestine
- 31.5247°N 35.1107°E
- Type: Tomb, mosque, synagogue
- Cultures: Hebrew, Byzantine, Ayyubid, Crusader, Ottoman
- Location: Hebron (Palestinian Territories)
- Region: West Bank

The Cave of the Patriarchs or Tomb of the Patriarchs, known to Jews by its Biblical name Cave of Machpelah (Biblical Hebrew: מְעָרַת הַמַּכְפֵּלָה, romanized: Məʿāraṯ hamMaḵpēlā, lit. 'Cave of the Double') and to Muslims as the Ibrahami Mosque (Arabic: المسجد الإبراهيمي, romanized: al-Masjid al-ʾibrāhīmī), or Sanctuary of Ibrahim (Arabic: الحرم الإبراهيمي, romanized: al-Ḥaram al-ʾibrāhīmī), is a series of caves situated in the heart of the Old City of Hebron in the West Bank, 30 kilometres (19 mi) south of Jerusalem. According to the Abrahamic religions, the cave and adjoining field were purchased by Abraham as a burial plot. The site is considered a holy place in Judaism, Christianity, and Islam.

Over the cave stands a large rectangular enclosure dating from the Herodian era. During Byzantine rule of the region, a Christian basilica was built on the site; the structure was converted into the Ibrahimi Mosque following the Muslim conquest of the Byzantines. By the 12th century, the mosque and its surrounding regions had fallen under Crusader-state control, but were retaken in 1188 by the Ayyubid sultan Saladin, who again converted the structure into a mosque. In 1119 CE, a monk found bones inside the cave, believing them to be the bones of the patriarchs.

During the Six-Day War of 1967, the entire Jordanian-ruled West Bank was seized and occupied by the State of Israel, after which the mosque was divided, with half of it repurposed as a synagogue. In 1968, special Jewish services were authorized outside the usual permitted hours on the Jewish New Year and Day of Atonement.

== Etymology of "Makhpela" ==
=== Amoraic proposals ===
The etymology of the Biblical name for the site, Me'arat haMakhpela, is uncertain. The word Me'arat means "cave of" and haMakhpela may mean "doubled", "multiplied" or "twofold", so a literal translation would be "cave of the double". Two hypotheses are discussed by the Talmud in b. Eruvin 53a:

The cave of makhpela:

Abba Arikha and Samuel of Nehardea [disputed]; one said, "It is two chambers, one behind the other", and one said, "It is two chambers, one above the other." (Note: In all printings of b. Eruvin, beginning with the 1509 Florence edition, this line reads "one chamber and a mezzanine above it", which reflects the citation of Samuel b. Isaac in his commentary to Gen. 23:9. "Two chambers, one above the other", however, reflects all extant manuscripts and b. Bava Batra 58a.)

The position that the chambers are stacked is satisfactory—this is makhpela. However, according to the position that one is behind the other, what is makhpela? That it is doubled in [that it contains] couples:

"And Jacob came to his father Isaac, [to] Mamre, the 'City of the Four' which is Hebron ..." (Gen. 35:27). Isaac the Smith said, "The City of the Four Couples: Adam and Eve, Abraham and Sarah, Isaac and Rebecca, and Jacob and Leah".

According to b. Bava Batra 58a, Abba Arikha and Samuel of Nehardea agreed that the two chambers, whatever their layout, shared identical dimensions. Genesis Rabbah 58 gives a third hypothesis:

"And Epron's field which was in the makhpela ..." (Gen. 23:17). This teaches that it universally "doubles" the renown of those [within], as whoever is interred within is believed to have earned a very great reward [in Heaven].

=== Later scholarship ===
Saadia b. Joseph and Abraham ibn Ezra believed it referred to a "cave within a cave". Another hypothesis, supported by Samuel b. Meir, Moses b. Nachman, Obadiah Sforno, Moses Mendelssohn, Ernst Rosenmüller, and Samuel David Luzzatto, holds that makhpela isn't an adjective describing the cave but rather is a proper noun describing the tract of land on which it sits. This hypothesis is supported by the phrasing of some Bible verses, such as Genesis 49:30, "the cave in the field of the Makhpela . . ." The question over the right interpretation of makhpela has been discussed extensively in various Biblical commentaries.

Strong's Concordance derives makhpela from kaphal, a verb meaning “to double”.

== Biblical origin ==
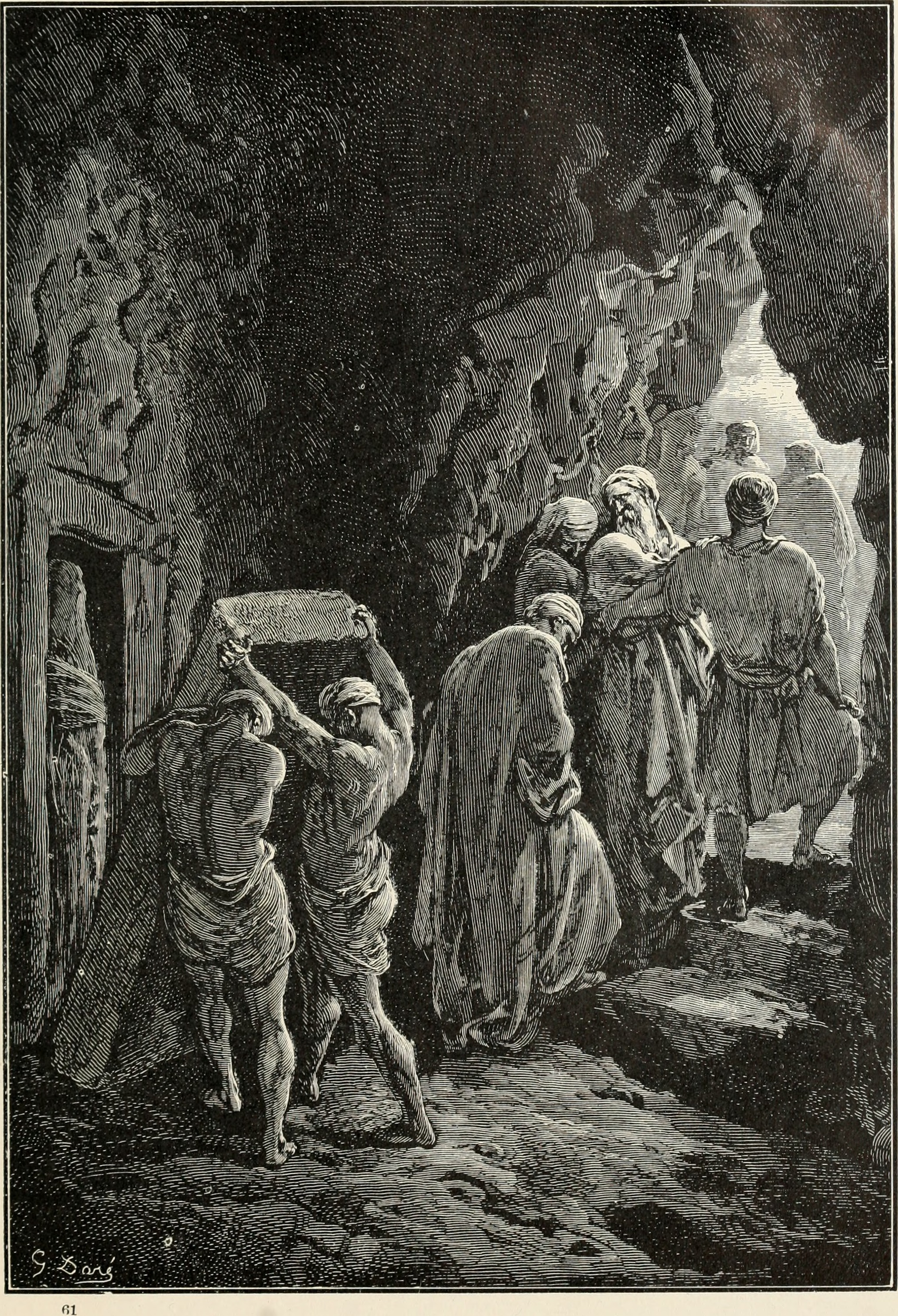
Woodcut by Gustave Doré depicting the burial of Sarah in the cave

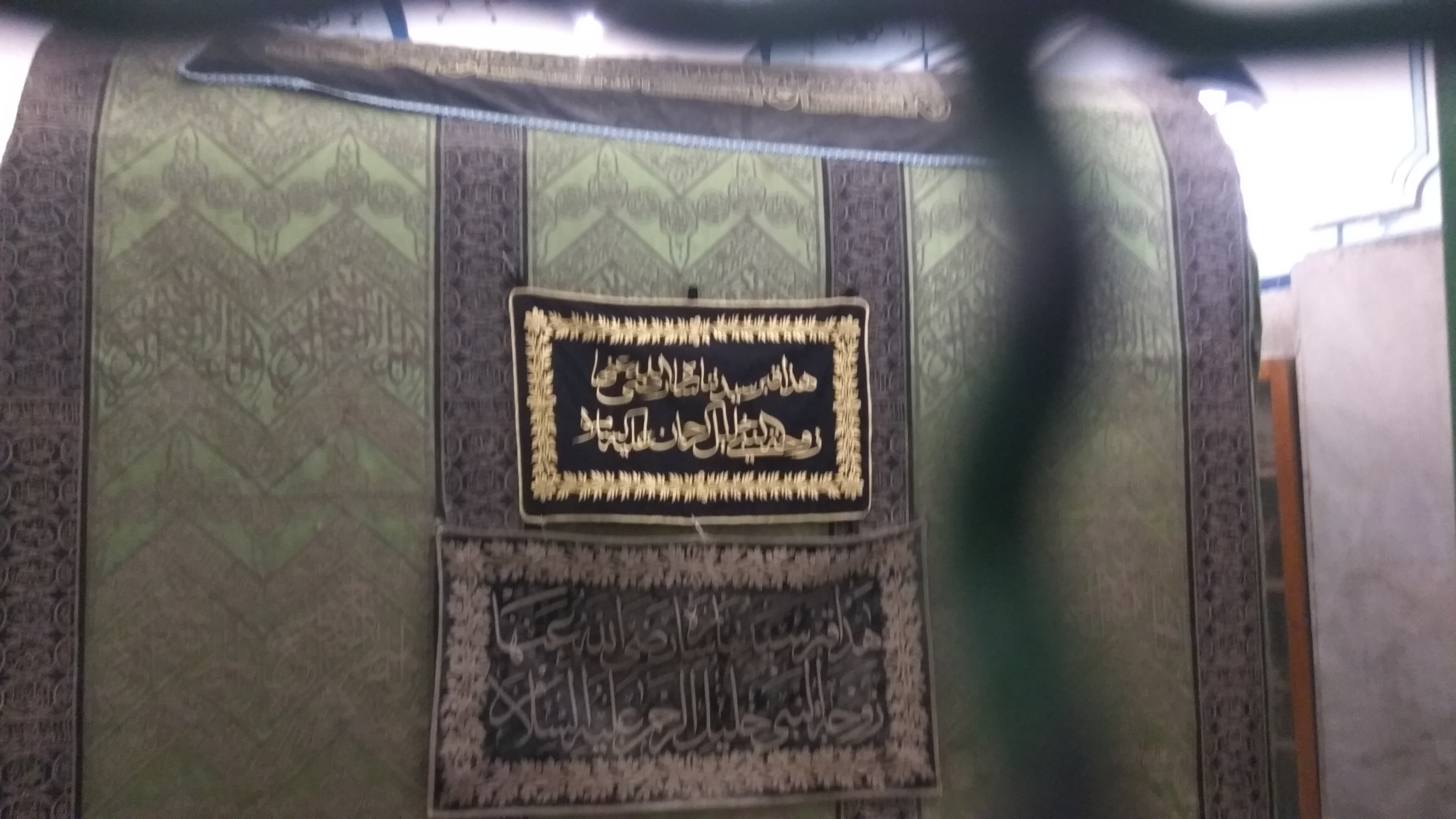
Tomb of Sarah in the Mosque

According to Genesis 23:1–20, Abraham's wife Sarah dies in Kiryat Arba near Hebron in the land of Canaan at the age of 127, being the only woman in the Bible whose exact age is given, while Abraham is tending to business elsewhere. Abraham comes to mourn for her. After a while he stands up and speaks to the Biblical Hittites. He tells them that he is a foreigner in their land and requests that they give him a burial site so that he can bury his dead. The Hittites flatter Abraham, call him a Lord and mighty prince, and say that he can bury his dead in any of their tombs. Abraham doesn't take them up on their offer and instead asks them to contact Ephron the Hittite, the son of Zohar, who lives in Mamre and owns the cave of Machpelah which he is offering to buy for "the full price". Ephron slyly replies that he is prepared to give Abraham the field and the cave within it, knowing that it would not result in Abraham having a permanent claim to it. Abraham politely refuses the offer and insists on paying for the field. Ephron replies that the field is worth four hundred shekels of silver and Abraham agrees to the price without any further bargaining. He then proceeded to bury his dead wife Sarah there.

The burial of Sarah is the first account of a burial in the Bible, and Abraham's purchase of Machpelah is the first commercial transaction mentioned.

The next burial in the cave is that of Abraham himself, who at the age of 175 years was buried by his sons Isaac and Ishmael. The title deed to the cave was part of the property of Abraham that passed to his son Isaac. The third burial was that of Isaac, by his two sons Esau and Jacob, who died when he was 180 years old. There is no mention of how or when Isaac's wife Rebecca died, but she is included in the list of those that had been buried in Machpelah in Jacob's final words to the children of Israel. Jacob himself died at the age of 147 years.

In the final chapter of Genesis, Joseph had his physicians embalm his father Jacob, before they removed him from Egypt to be buried in the cave of the field of Machpelah. When Joseph died in the last verse, he was also embalmed. He was buried much later in Shechem after the children of Israel came into the Promised Land.

=== Extra-biblical parallels ===
In the Ugaritic texts (13th–12th century BCE), three out of the six real estate contracts discovered were for the sum of 400 silver shekels, and the terms of sale in them parallel the Biblical description of the sale of Machpelah. Apparently 400 shekels was a common price for Canaanite real estate transactions in this period.

== History ==
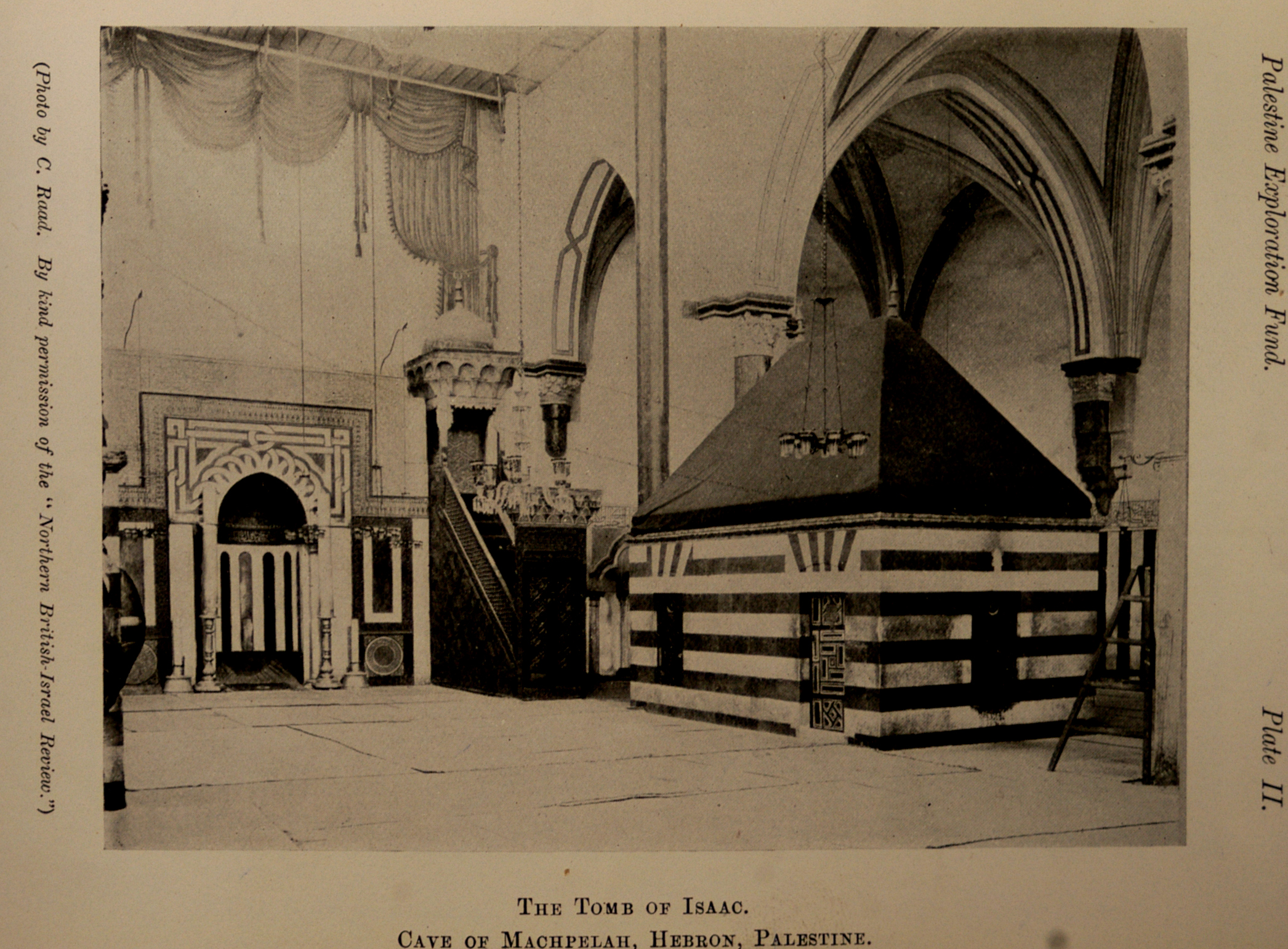
Tomb of Isaac, c. 1911

According to the Abrahamic religions, the cave and adjoining field were purchased by Abraham as a burial plot, although most historians believe the Abraham-Isaac-Jacob narrative to be primarily mythological.

=== First and Second Temple period ===
The time from which the Israelites regarded the site as sacred is unknown, though some scholars consider that the biblical story of Abraham's burial there probably dates from the 6th century BCE.

Between 31 and 4 BCE, Herod the Great built a large, rectangular enclosure over the cave to commemorate the site for his subjects. It is the only fully surviving Herodian structure from the period of Hellenistic Judaism. Herod's building, with 6-foot-thick (1.8 m) stone walls made from stones that were at least 3 feet (0.91 m) tall and sometimes reach a length of 24 feet (7.3 m), did not have a roof. Archaeologists are not certain where the original entrance to the enclosure was located, or even if there was one. The Herodian building stands on an earlier structure possibly built during the Hasmonean dynasty (c. 2nd century BCE).

In 2020, Israeli archaeologists led by David Ben-Shlomo (Ariel University) dated pottery from the caves (recovered surreptitiously by local residents in 1981) to the 8th century BCE. The different origins of the shards, from various areas around Hebron and Jerusalem, suggest the site may have been a pilgrimage site as early as this date, according to the study authors.

=== Byzantine Christian period ===
Until the era of the Byzantine Empire, the interior of the enclosure remained exposed to the sky. Under Byzantine rule, a simple basilica was constructed at the southeastern end and the enclosure was roofed everywhere except at the centre.

During this period, the site became an important Christian pilgrimage destination. The Pilgrim of Bordeaux, c. 333, reported "a monument of square form built of stone of wondrous beauty, in which lie Abraham, Isaac, Jacob, Sara, Rebecca, and Leah". The Piacenza Pilgrim (c. 570) noted in his pilgrimage account that Jews and Christians shared possession of the site.

Restoration work in 2015 revealed two inscriptions on the inner wall, written in Jewish Palestinian Aramaic. One reads "Tanhum", while the other reads "Rabbi Ya'aqov the ḥazzān and his brothers"; the latter's first word is written in stylized lettering comparable to Jewish scripts of the Byzantine period.

=== Arab period ===
In 614, the Sasanid Persians conquered the area and destroyed the castle, leaving only ruins; but in 637, the area came under the control of the Arab Muslims and the building was reconstructed as a roofed mosque.

The Muslims permitted the building of two small synagogues at the site.

During the 10th century, an entrance was pierced through the north-eastern wall, some way above the external ground level, and steps from the north and from the east were built up to it (one set of steps for entering, the other for leaving). A building known as the qal'ah (قلعة i.e. castle) was also constructed near the middle of the southwestern side. Its purpose is unknown but one historic account claims that it marked the spot where Joseph was buried (see Joseph's Tomb), the area having been excavated by a Muslim caliph, under the influence of a local tradition regarding Joseph's tomb. Some archaeologists believe that the original entrance to Herod's structure was in the location of the qal'ah and that the northeastern entrance was created so that the kalah could be built by the former entrance.

=== Crusader period ===
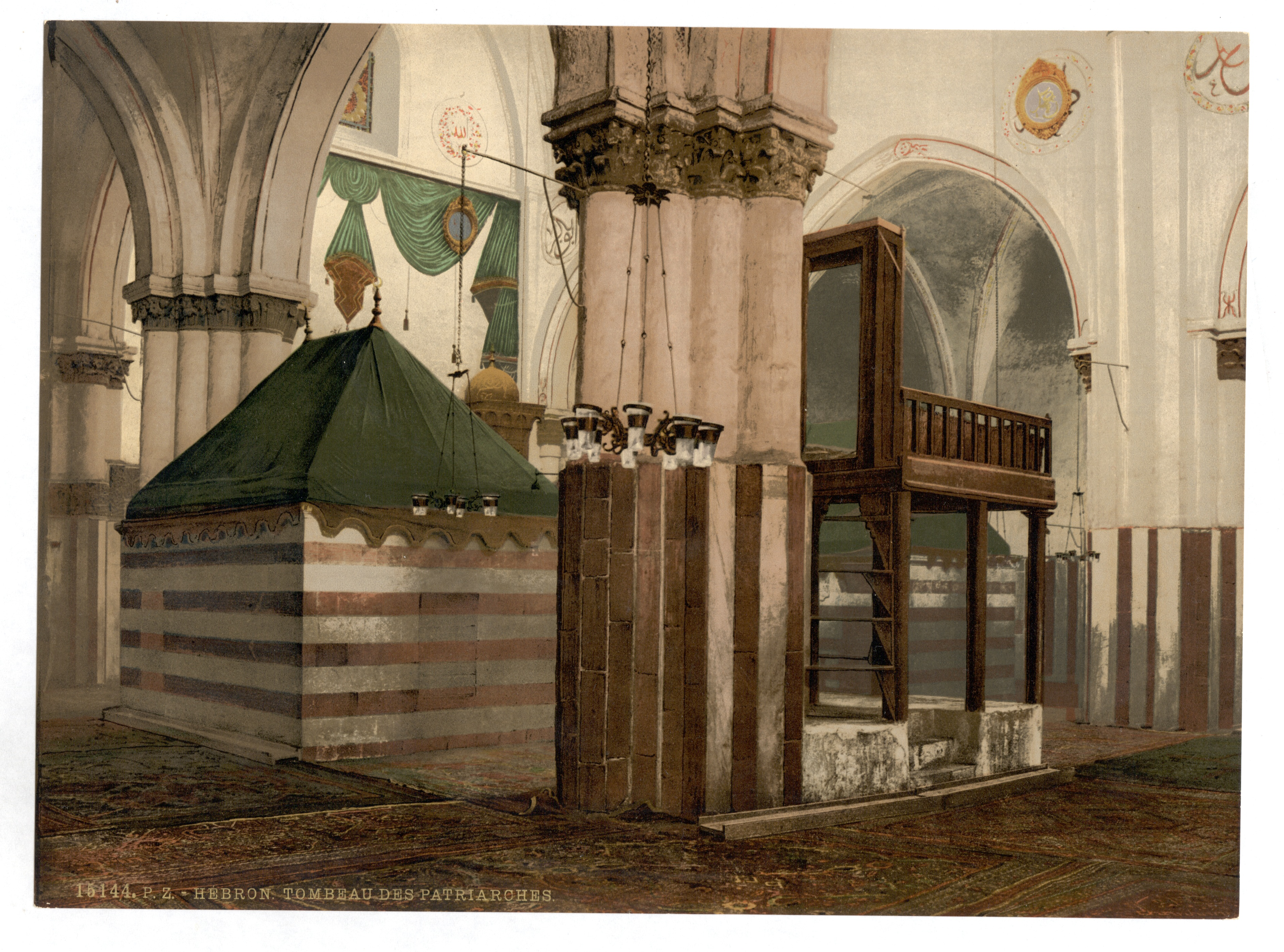
Print from c. 1890

In 1100, after the area was captured by the Crusaders, the enclosure once again became a church and Muslims were no longer permitted to enter. During this period, the area was given a new gabled roof, clerestory windows and vaulting.

When the Crusaders took control of the site Jews were banned from using the synagogues.

In the year 1113 during the reign of Baldwin II of Jerusalem, according to Ali of Herat (writing in 1173), a certain part over the cave of Abraham had given way, and "a number of Franks had made their entrance therein". And they discovered "(the bodies) of Abraham, Isaac and Jacob", "their shrouds having fallen to pieces, lying propped up against a wall. ... Then the King, after providing new shrouds, caused the place to be closed once more". Similar information is given in Ibn al Athir's Chronicle under the year 1119; "In this year was opened the tomb of Abraham, and those of his two sons Isaac and Jacob. ... Many people saw the Patriarch. Their limbs had nowise been disturbed, and beside them were placed lamps of gold and of silver." The Damascene nobleman and historian Ibn al-Qalanisi in his chronicle also alludes at this time to the discovery of relics purported to be those of Abraham, Isaac and Jacob, a discovery that excited eager curiosity among all three communities in the southern Levant, Muslim, Jewish, and Christian.

Towards the end of the period of Crusader rule, in 1166 Maimonides visited Hebron and wrote, "On Sunday, 9 Marheshvan (17 October), I left Jerusalem for Hebron to kiss the tombs of my ancestors in the Cave. On that day, I stood in the cave and prayed, praise be to God, (in gratitude) for everything."

In 1170, Benjamin of Tudela visited the city, which he called by its Frankish name, St. Abram de Bron. He reported:

"Here that there is the great church called St. Abram, and this was a Jewish place of worship at the time of the Mohammedan rule, but the Gentiles have erected there six tombs, respectively called those of Abraham and Sarah, Isaac and Rebekah, Jacob and Leah. The custodians tell the pilgrims that these are the tombs of the Patriarchs, for which information the pilgrims give them money. If a Jew comes, however, and gives a special reward, the custodian of the cave opens unto him a gate of iron, which was constructed by our forefathers, and then he is able to descend below by means of steps, holding a lighted candle in his hand. He then reaches a cave, in which nothing is to be found, and a cave beyond, which is likewise empty, but when he reaches the third cave behold there are six sepulchres, those of Abraham, Isaac and Jacob, respectively facing those of Sarah, Rebekah and Leah, upon which the names of the three Patriarchs and their wives are inscribed in Hebrew characters. The cave is filled with barrels containing bones of people, which are taken there as to a sacred place. At the end of the field of the Machpelah stands Abraham's house with a spring in front of it".

=== Ayyubid period ===
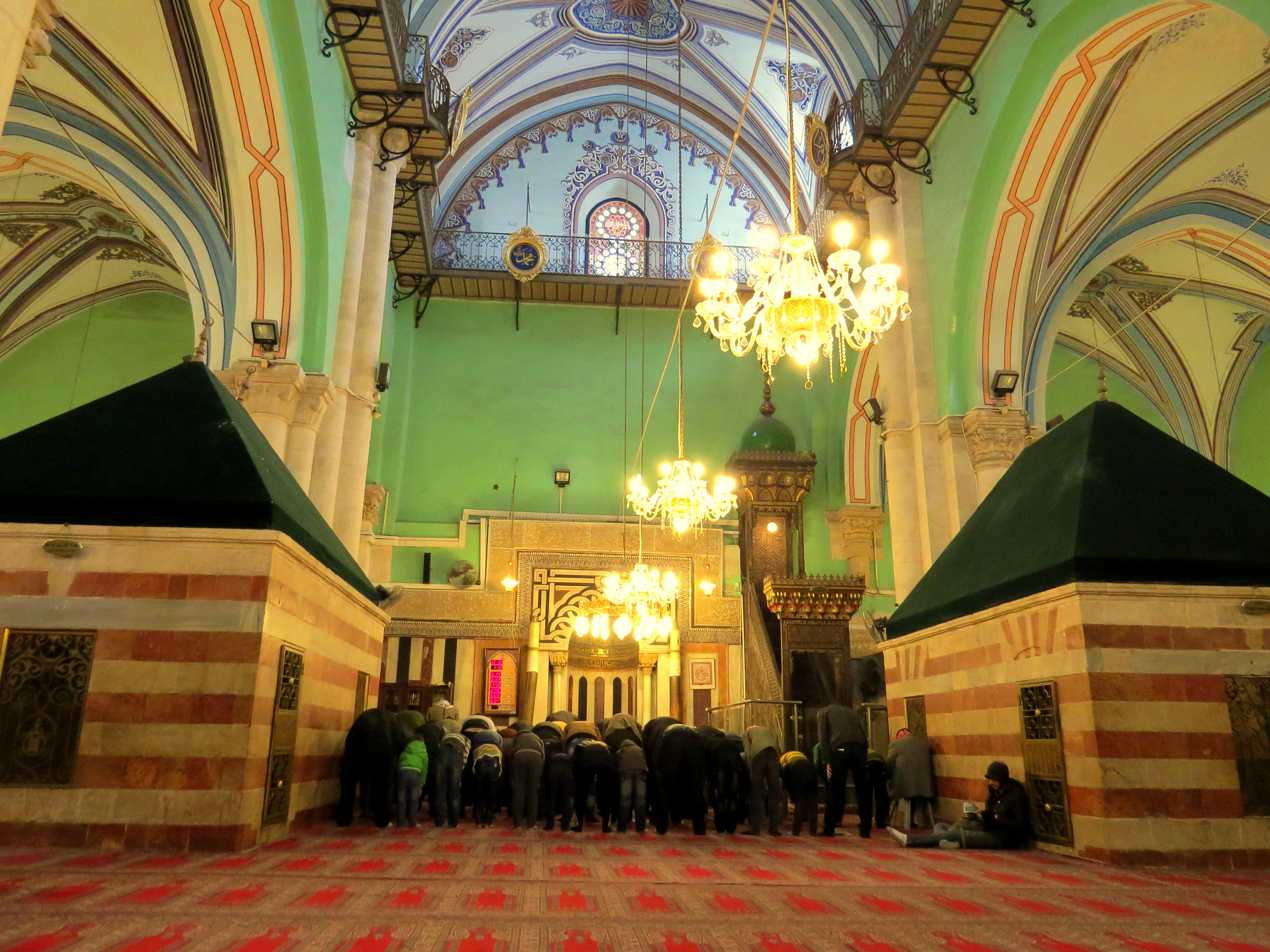
Muslims pray, in January 2014.

In 1188 Saladin conquered the area, reconverting the enclosure to a mosque but allowing Christians to continue worshipping there. Saladin also added a minaret at each corner—two of which still survive—and added an existing minbar (pulpit) from the Shrine of Husayn's Head near Ascalon to the mosque's interior. Samuel ben Samson visited the cave in 1210; he says that the visitor must descend by twenty-four steps in a passageway so narrow that the rock touches him on either hand.

=== Mamluk period ===
Between 1318 and 1320, the Mamluk governor of Gaza, a province that included Hebron, Sanjar al-Jawli ordered the construction of the Amir Jawli Mosque within the Haram enclosure to enlarge the prayer space and accommodate worshipers. In the late 14th century, under the Mamluks, two additional entrances were pierced into the western end of the south western side and the kalah was extended upwards to the level of the rest of the enclosure. A cenotaph in memory of Joseph was created in the upper level of the kalah so that visitors to the enclosure would not need to leave and travel round the outside just to pay respects. The Mamluks also built the northwestern staircase and the six cenotaphs (for Isaac, Rebecca, Jacob, Leah, Abraham, and Sarah, respectively), distributed evenly throughout the enclosure. The Mamluks forbade Jews from entering the site, allowing them only as close as the fifth step on a staircase at the southeast, but after some time this was increased to the seventh step.

The Jewish geographer Ishtori Haparchi, who visited the site in the 14th century, reported that a large square of high wall surrounded the tomb. According to a local tradition he recorded there, the stones of the wall were taken from the Temple built by King Solomon.

=== Ottoman period ===
During the Ottoman period, the dilapidated state of the patriarchs' tombs was restored, with Ali Bey, one of the few foreigners to gain access, reporting in 1807 that,

all the sepulchres of the patriarchs are covered with rich carpets of green silk, magnificently embroidered with gold; those of the wives are red, embroidered in like manner. The sultans of Constantinople furnish these carpets, which are renewed from time to time. Ali Bey counted nine, one over the other, upon the sepulchre of Abraham.

A contemporary traveller, M. Ermete Pierotti, in 1862 described the great jealousy with which the Muslims guarded the sanctuary and the practice of sending petitions to the patriarchs:

The true entrance to the Patriarchs' tomb is to be seen close to the western wall of the enclosure, and near the north-west comer; it is guarded by a very thick iron railing, and I was not allowed to go near it. I observed that the Mussulmans themselves did not go very near it. In the court opposite the entrance gate of the Mosque, there is an opening, through which I was allowed to go down for three steps, and I was able to ascertain by sight and touch that the rock exists there, and to conclude it to be about five feet thick. From the short observations I could make during my brief descent, as also from the consideration of the east wall of the Mosque, and the little information I extracted from the Chief Santon, who jealously guards the sanctuary, I consider that a part of the grotto exists under the Mosque, and that the other part is under the court, but at a lower level than that lying under the Mosque. This latter must be separated from the former by a vertical stratum of rock which contains an opening, as I conclude, for two reasons : first, because the east wall being entirely solid and massive, requires a good foundation; secondly, because the petitions which the Mussulmans present to the Santon to be transmitted to the Patriarchs are thrown, some through one opening, some through the other, according to the Patriarch to whom they are directed; and the Santon goes down by the way I went, whence I suppose that on that side there is a vestibule, and that the tombs may be found below it. I explained my conjectures to the Santon himself after leaving the Mosque, and he showed himself very much surprised at the time, and told the Pacha afterwards that I knew more about it than the Turks themselves. The fact is that even the Pacha who governs the province has no right to penetrate into the sacred enclosure, where (according to the Mussulman legend) the Patriarchs are living, and only condescend to receive the petitions addressed to them by mortals.

=== Jordanian control ===
After Jordan occupied the West Bank in 1948, no Jews were allowed in the territory and consequently no Jews could visit the tomb. In the 1960s, Jordan renovated the area surrounding the mosque, destroying several historical buildings in the process, among them, the ruins of the nearby Crusader fortress built in 1168.

=== Israeli control and Judaization ===
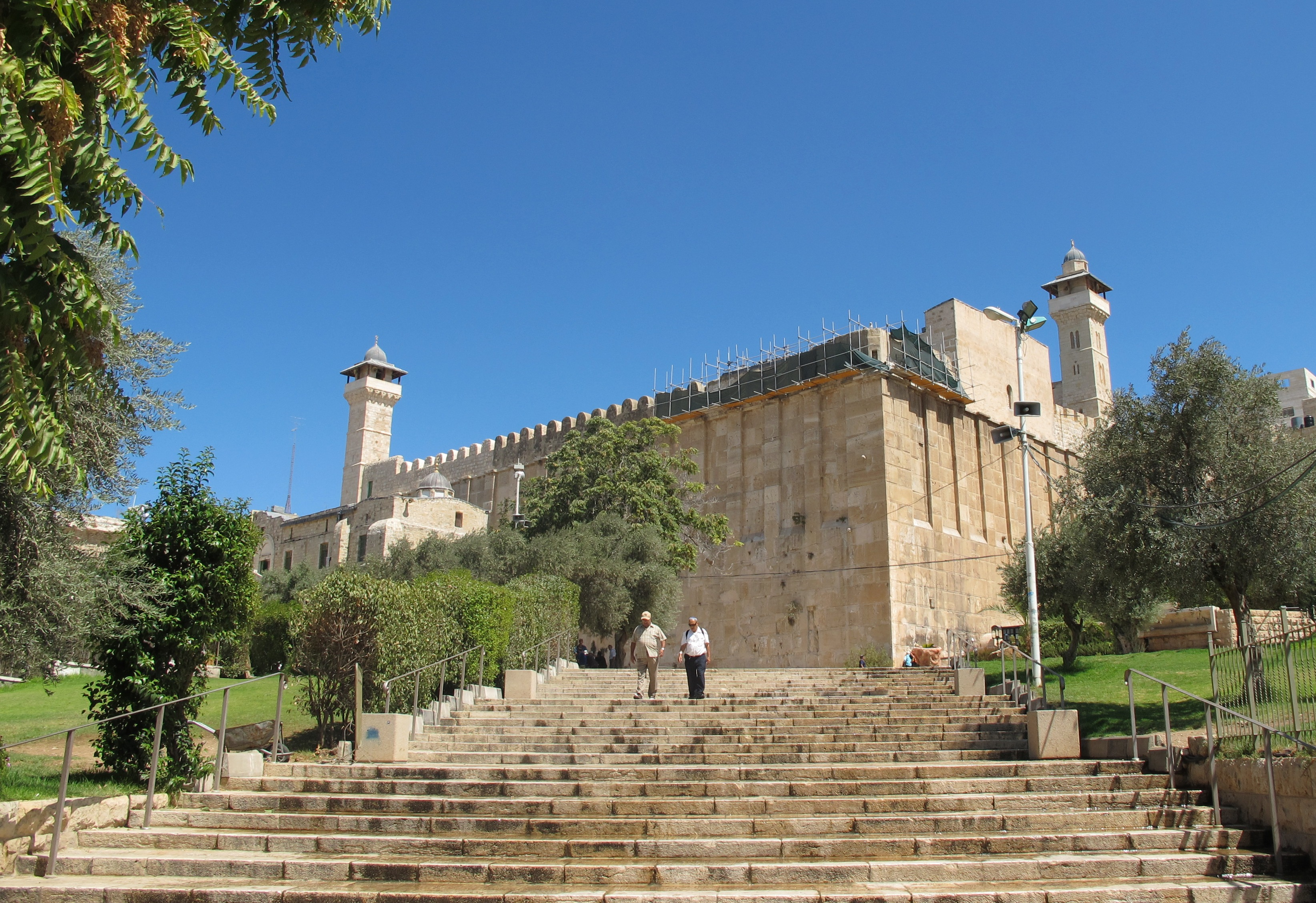
Cave of the Patriarchs, 2010, as seen from the Israeli-controlled side

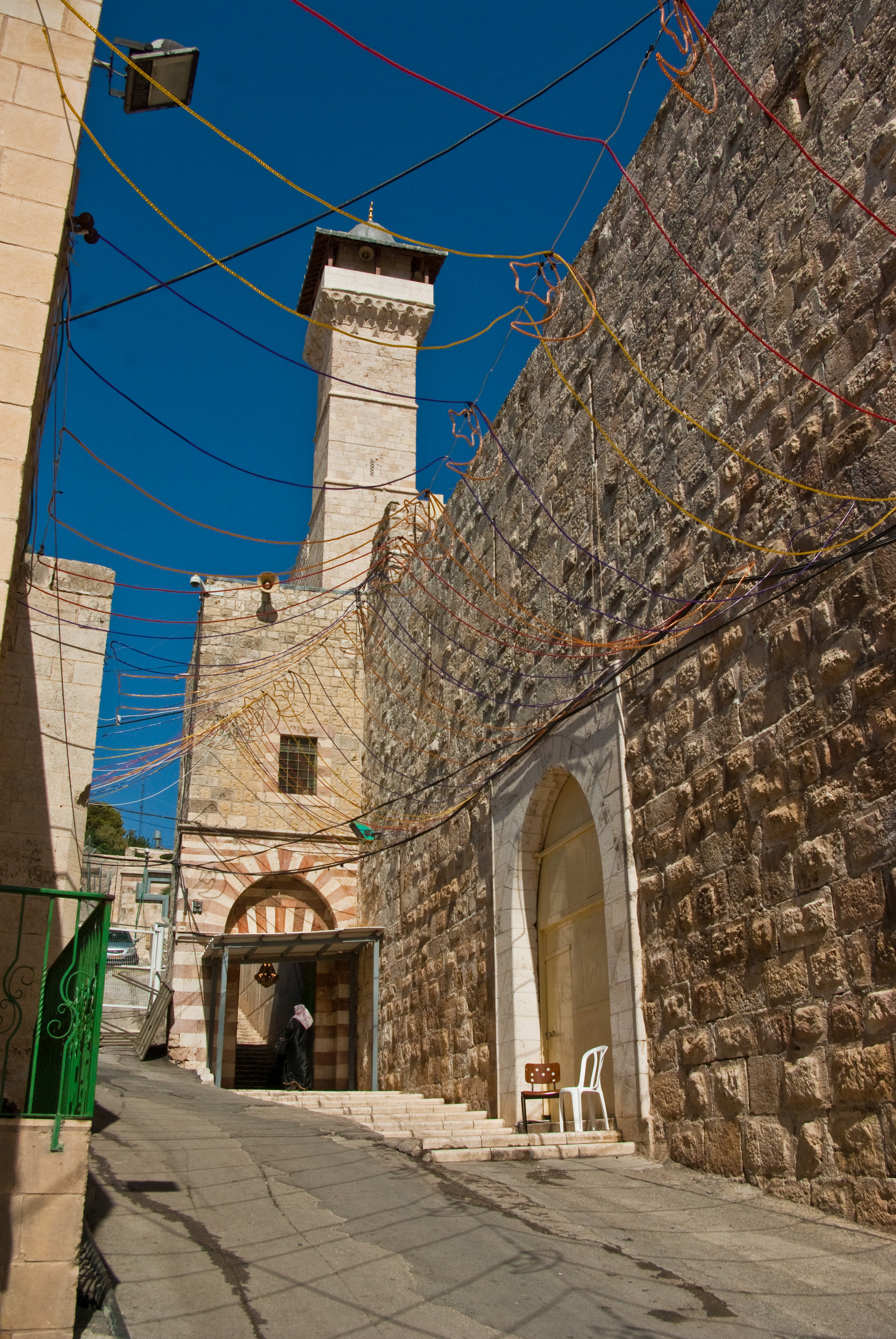
Entrance to Ibrahimi Mosque, Hebron, 2019

Following the Israeli occupation of the West Bank in the Six-Day War, Hebron came under Jewish control for the first time in 2,000 years, though restrictions on visits by Jews were to continue. According to the autobiography of Shlomo Goren, Chief Rabbi of the Israel Defense Forces, he attached chains to his Jeep and pulled down the doors. Subsequently the Mufti of Hebron delivered a surrender note to him.

The first Jew to enter the burial caves was Michal Arbel, the 13-year-old daughter of Yehuda Arbel, chief of Shin Bet operations in the West Bank, because she was slender enough to be lowered into the narrow, 28 centimetres (11 in) wide hole on 9 October 1968, to gain access to the tomb site, after which she took photographs.

Israeli settlers reestablished a small synagogue under the mosque. The first Jewish wedding ceremony to take place in it was on 7 August 1968. The stone stairway leading to the mosque was also destroyed in order to erase the humiliating "seventh step".

In 1968, a special arrangement was made to accommodate Jewish services on the Jewish New Year and Day of Atonement. This led to an attack on worshippers, with a hand-grenade being thrown on the stairway leading to the tomb on 9 October; 47 Israelis were injured, 8 seriously. On 4 November, a large explosion went off near the gate to the compound and 6 people, Jews and Arabs, were wounded. On Yom Kippur eve, 3 October 1976, an Arab mob destroyed several Torah scrolls and prayer books at the tomb. In May 1980, an attack on Jewish worshippers returning from prayers at the tomb left 6 dead and 17 wounded.

In 1981, a group of Jewish settlers from the Hebron community led by Noam Arnon broke into the caves and took photos of the burial chambers.

Tensions would later increase as the Israeli government signed the Oslo Accords in September 1993, which gave limited autonomy to the PLO in the West Bank city of Jericho and the Gaza Strip. The city of Hebron and the rest of the major Palestinian population centers in the West Bank were not included in the initial agreement. The Cave of the Patriarchs massacre committed by Baruch Goldstein, an Israeli-American settler in February 1994, left 29 Palestinian Muslims dead and scores injured. The resulting riots resulted in a further 35 deaths.

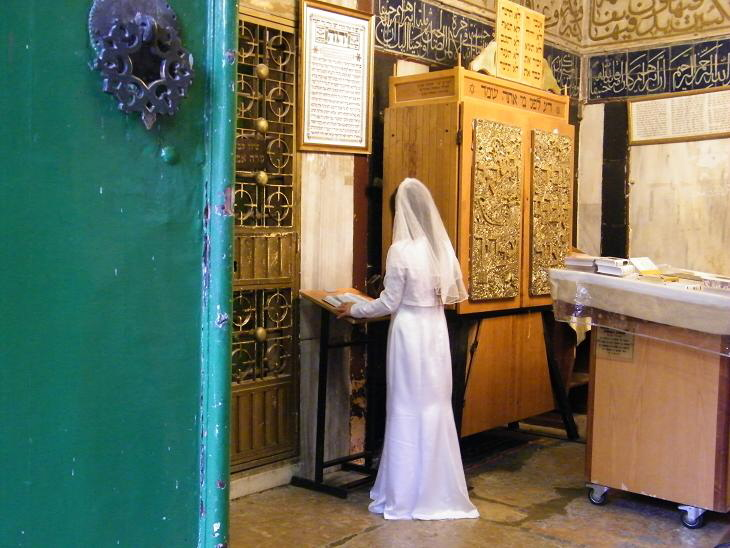
Jewish bride praying at the site before her wedding, 2010

The increased sensitivity of the site meant that in 1996 the Wye River Accords, part of the Arab–Israeli peace process, included a temporary status agreement for the site restricting access for both Jews and Muslims. As part of this agreement, the waqf (Islamic charitable trust) controls 81% of the building. This includes the whole of the southeastern section, which lies above the only known entrance to the caves and possibly over the entirety of the caves themselves. As a consequence, Jews are not permitted to visit the Cenotaphs of Isaac or Rebecca, which lie entirely within the southeastern section, except for 10 days a year that hold special significance in Judaism. One of these days is the Shabbat Chayei Sarah, when the Torah portion concerning the death of Sarah and the purchase by Abraham of the land in which the caves are situated, is read.

The Israeli authorities do not allow Jewish religious authorities the right to maintain the site and allow only the waqf to do so. Tourists are permitted to enter the site. Security at the site has increased since the Intifada; the Israel Defense Forces surround the site with soldiers and control access to the shrines. Israeli forces also subject locals to checkpoints and bar all non-Jews from setting foot on some of the main roads to the complex and ban Palestinian vehicles from many of the roads in the area.

On 21 February 2010, Israel announced that it would include the site in a national heritage site protection and rehabilitation plan. The announcement sparked protests from the UN, Arab governments and the United States. A subsequent UNESCO vote in October aimed to affirm that the "al-Haram al-Ibrahimi/Tomb of the Patriarchs in al-Khalil/Hebron" was "an integral part of the occupied Palestinian Territories."

Israeli authorities have placed restrictions on calling the faithful to prayer by the muezzin of the Ibrahimi mosque. The order was enforced 61 times in October 2014, and 52 times in December of that year. This was following numerous complaints by the Jewish residents who claim that the calls violate legal decibel limits. In December 2009 Israeli authorities banned Jewish music played at the cave following similar complaints from the Arab residents.

== Structure ==
=== Building ===
Plan of the building

The rectangular stone enclosure lies on a northwest–southeast axis, and is divided into two sections by a wall running between the northwestern three fifths, and the southeastern two fifths. The northwestern section is roofed on three sides, the central area and north eastern side being open to the sky; the southeastern section is fully roofed, the roof being supported by four columns evenly distributed through the section. Nearly the entire building itself was built by King Herod and it remains the only Herodian building surviving today virtually intact.

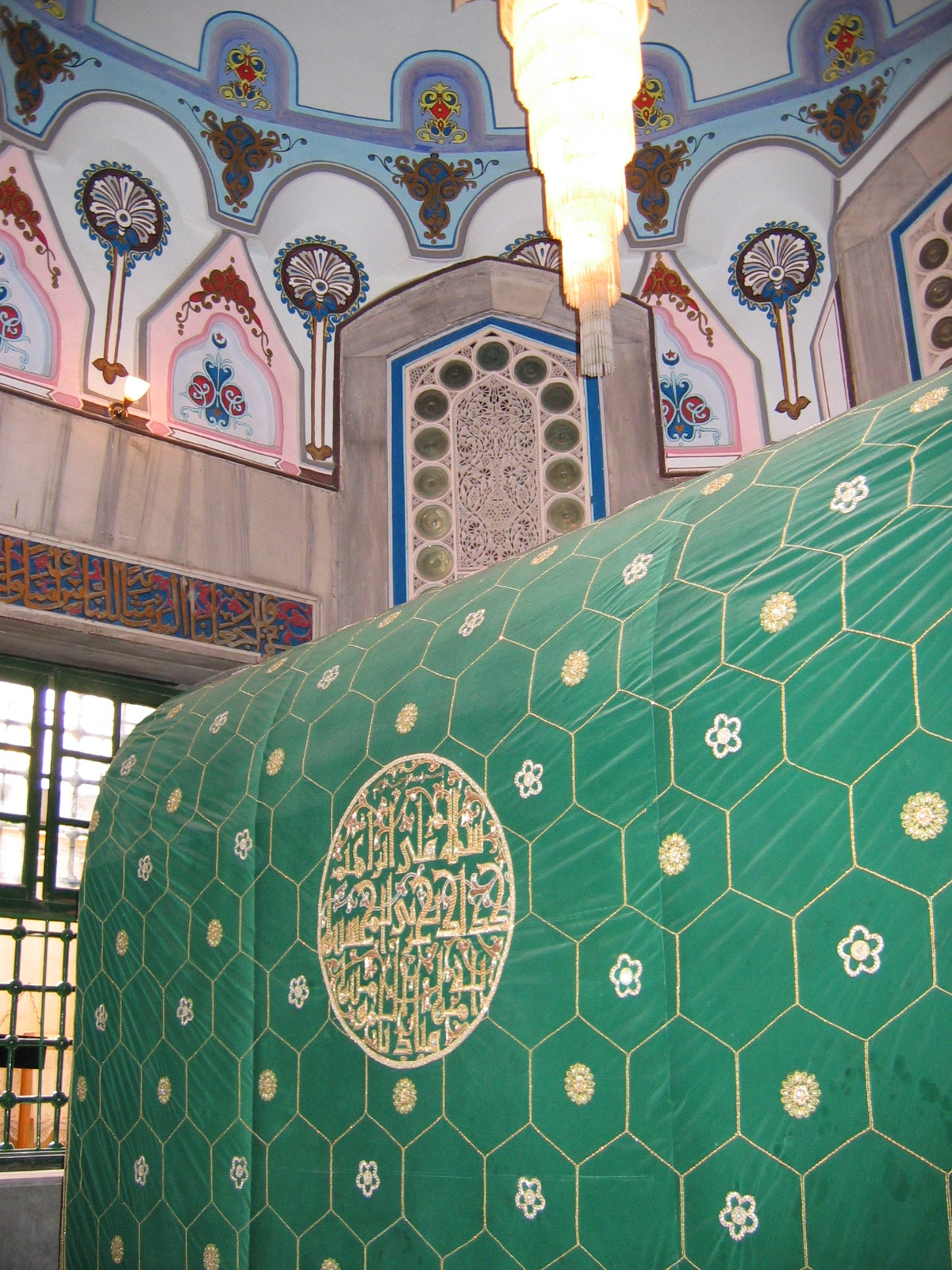
Cenotaph of Abraham

In the northwestern section are four cenotaphs, each housed in a separate octagonal room, those dedicated to Jacob and Leah being on the northwest, and those to Abraham and Sarah on the southeast. A corridor runs between the cenotaphs on the northwest, and another between those on the southeast. A third corridor runs the length of the southwestern side, through which access to the cenotaphs, and to the southeastern section, can be gained. An entrance to the enclosure exists on the southwestern side, entering this third corridor; a mosque outside this entrance must be passed through to gain access.

At the center of the northeastern side, there is another entrance, which enters the roofed area on the southeastern side of the northwestern section and through which access can also be gained to the southeastern (fully roofed) section. This entrance is approached on the outside by a corridor which leads from a long staircase running most of the length of the northwestern side. The southeastern section, which functions primarily as a mosque, contains two cenotaphs, symmetrically placed, near the center, dedicated to Isaac and Rebecca. Between them, in the southeastern wall, is a mihrab. The cenotaphs have a distinctive red and white horizontal striped pattern to their stonework but are usually covered by decorative cloth.

Under the present arrangements, Jews are restricted to entering by the southwestern side, and limited to the southwestern corridor and the corridors that run between the cenotaphs, while Muslims may enter only by the northeastern side but are allowed free rein of the remainder of the enclosure.

=== Caves ===
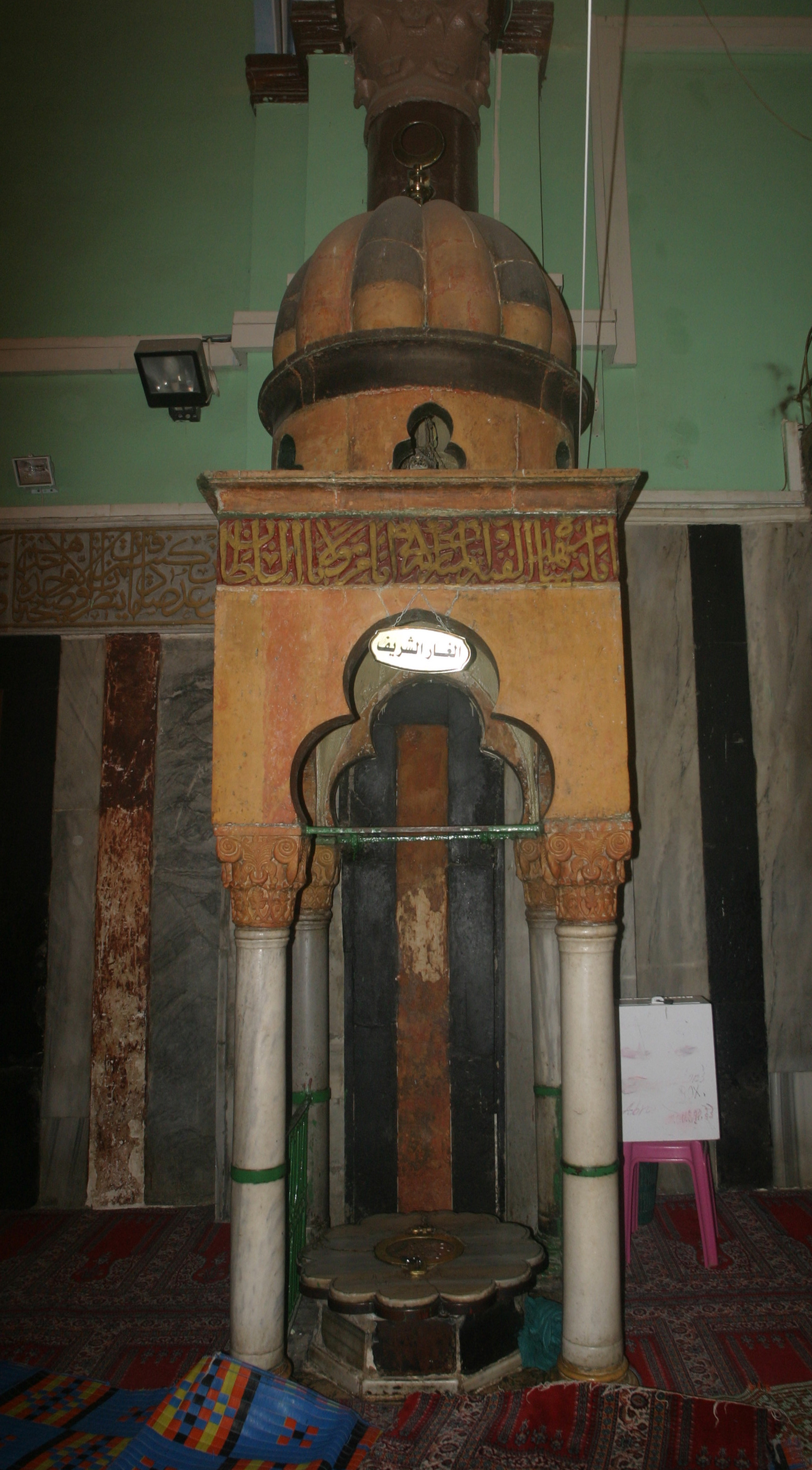
The stone canopy above the more visible known entrance to the caves

The caves under the enclosure are not themselves generally accessible; the waqf have historically prevented access to the actual tombs out of respect for the dead. Only two entrances are known to exist, the most visible of which is located to the immediate southeast of Abraham's cenotaph on the inside of the southeastern section. This entrance is a narrow shaft covered by a decorative grate, which itself is covered by an elaborate dome. The other entrance is located to the southeast, near the mihrab, and is sealed by a large stone, and usually covered by prayer mats; this is very close to the location of the seventh step on the outside of the enclosure, beyond which the Mamelukes forbade Jews from approaching.

When the enclosure was controlled by crusaders, access was occasionally possible. One account, by Rabbi Benjamin of Tudela dating from 1163 CE, states that after passing through an iron door, and descending, the caves would be encountered. According to Benjamin of Tudela, there was a sequence of three caves, the first two of which were empty; in the third cave were six tombs, arranged to be opposite to one another.

These caves had been rediscovered only in 1119 CE by a monk named Arnoul, after an unnamed monk at prayer "noticed a draught" in the area near the present location of the mihrab and, with other "brethren", removed the flagstones and found a room lined with Herodian masonry. Arnoul, still searching for the source of the draught, hammered on the cave walls until he heard a hollow sound, pulled down the masonry in that area, and discovered a narrow passage. The narrow passage, which subsequently became known as the serdab (Arabic for passage), was similarly lined with masonry, but partly blocked up. Having unblocked the passage, Arnoul discovered a large round room with plastered walls. In the floor of the room, he found a square stone slightly different from the others and, upon removing it, found the first of the caves. The caves were filled with dust. After removing the dust, Arnoul found bones; believing the bones to be those of the biblical Patriarchs, Arnoul washed them in wine and stacked them neatly. Arnoul carved inscriptions on the cave walls describing whose bones he believed them to be.

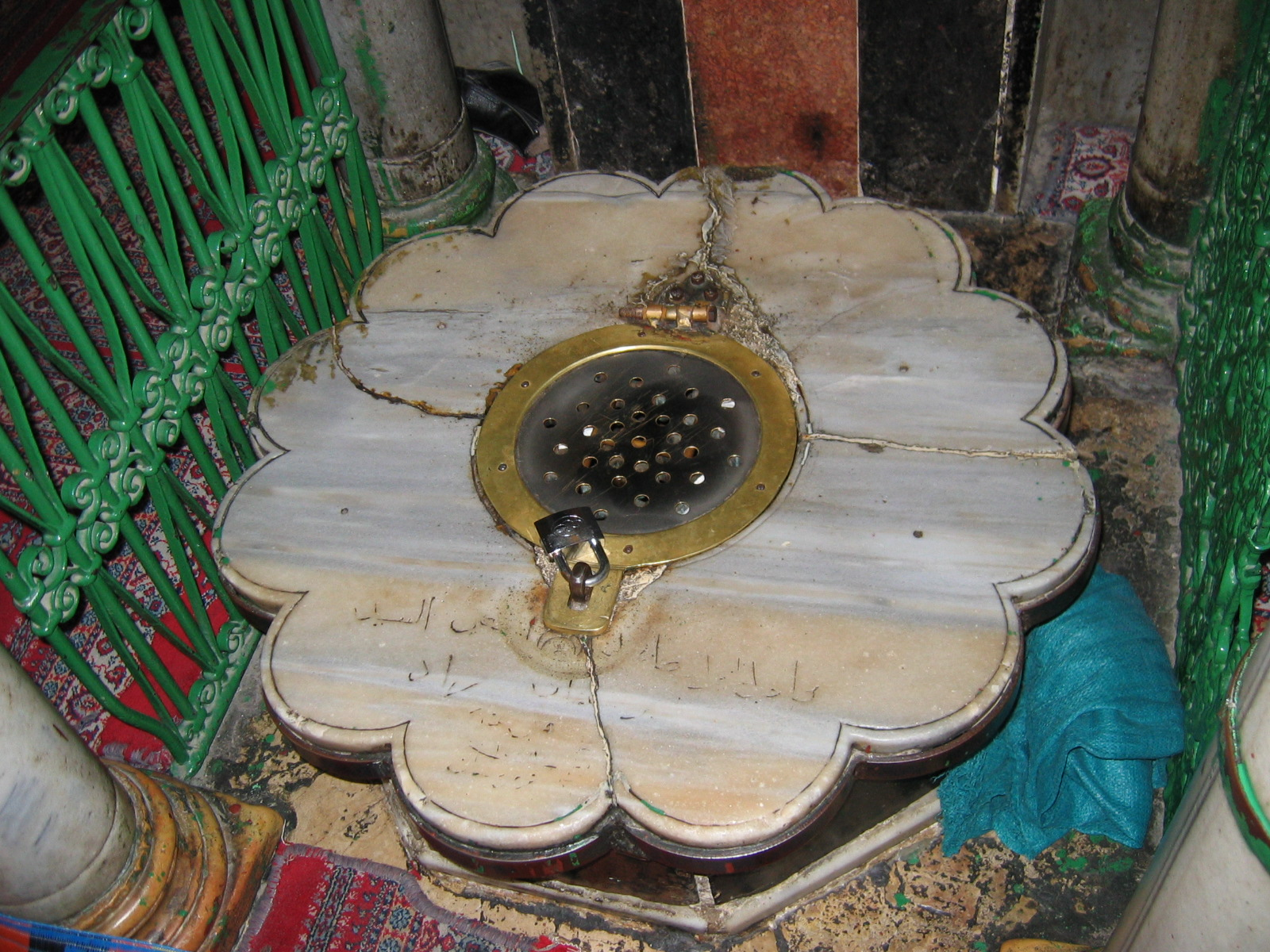
The more visible known entrance to the caves

This passage to the caves was sealed at some time after Saladin had recaptured the area, though the roof of the circular room was pierced, and a decorative grate was placed over it. In 1967, after the Six-Day War, the area fell into the hands of the Israel Defense Forces, and Moshe Dayan, the Defence Minister, who was an amateur archaeologist, attempted to regain access to the tombs. Ignorant of the serdab entrance, Dayan concentrated his attention on the shaft visible below the decorative grate and had the idea of sending someone thin enough to fit through the shaft and down into the chamber below. Dayan eventually found a slim 12-year-old girl named Michal to assist and sent her into the chamber with a camera.

Michal explored the round chamber, but failed to find the square stone in the floor that led to the caves. Michal did, however, explore the passage and find steps leading up to the surface, though the exit was blocked by a large stone (this is the entrance near the mihrab). According to the report of her findings, which Michal gave to Dayan after having been lifted back through the shaft, there are 16 steps leading down into the passage, which is 1 cubit wide, 17.37 metres (57.0 ft) and 1 metre (3 ft 3 in) high. In the round chamber, which is 12 metres (39 ft) below the entrance to the shaft, there are three stone slabs, the middle of which contains a partial inscription of Sura 2, verse 255, from the Quran, the famous Ayatul Kursi, Verse of the Throne.

In 1981, Seev Jevin, the former director of the Israel Antiquities Authority, entered the passage after a group of Jewish settlers from Hebron had entered the chamber via the entrance near the mihrab and discovered the square stone in the round chamber that concealed the cave entrance. The reports state that after entering the first cave, which seemed to Jevin to be empty, he found a passage leading to a second oval chamber, smaller than the first, which contained shards of pottery and a wine jug. Findings published in the Israel Exploration Journal in 2020 stated that the pottery dated from the 8th century BCE and originated from various locations in the Hebron and Jerusalem areas.

== Religions beliefs and traditions ==
=== Judaism ===
According to the Book of Genesis, Abraham specifically purchased the land for use as a burial plot from Ephron the Hittite, making it one of two purchases by Abraham of real estate in the Land of Canaan, the Promised Land. The book describes how the three patriarchs and their wives, the matriarchs, were buried there.

- Abraham and Sarah (Genesis 23:1–20; Genesis 49:31)
- Isaac and Rebekah (Genesis 35:29; Genesis 49:31)
- Jacob and Leah (Genesis 49:28–33; Genesis 50:4–5; Genesis 50:12–13)

The only matriarch missing is Jacob's other wife, Rachel, described in Genesis as having been buried near Bethlehem. These verses are the common source for the religious beliefs surrounding the cave. While they are not part of the Quran they exist in Islam's oral tradition. The story of Abraham's burial is recounted in, for example, Ibn Kathir's 14th century Stories of the Prophets (Qisas al-Anbiya).

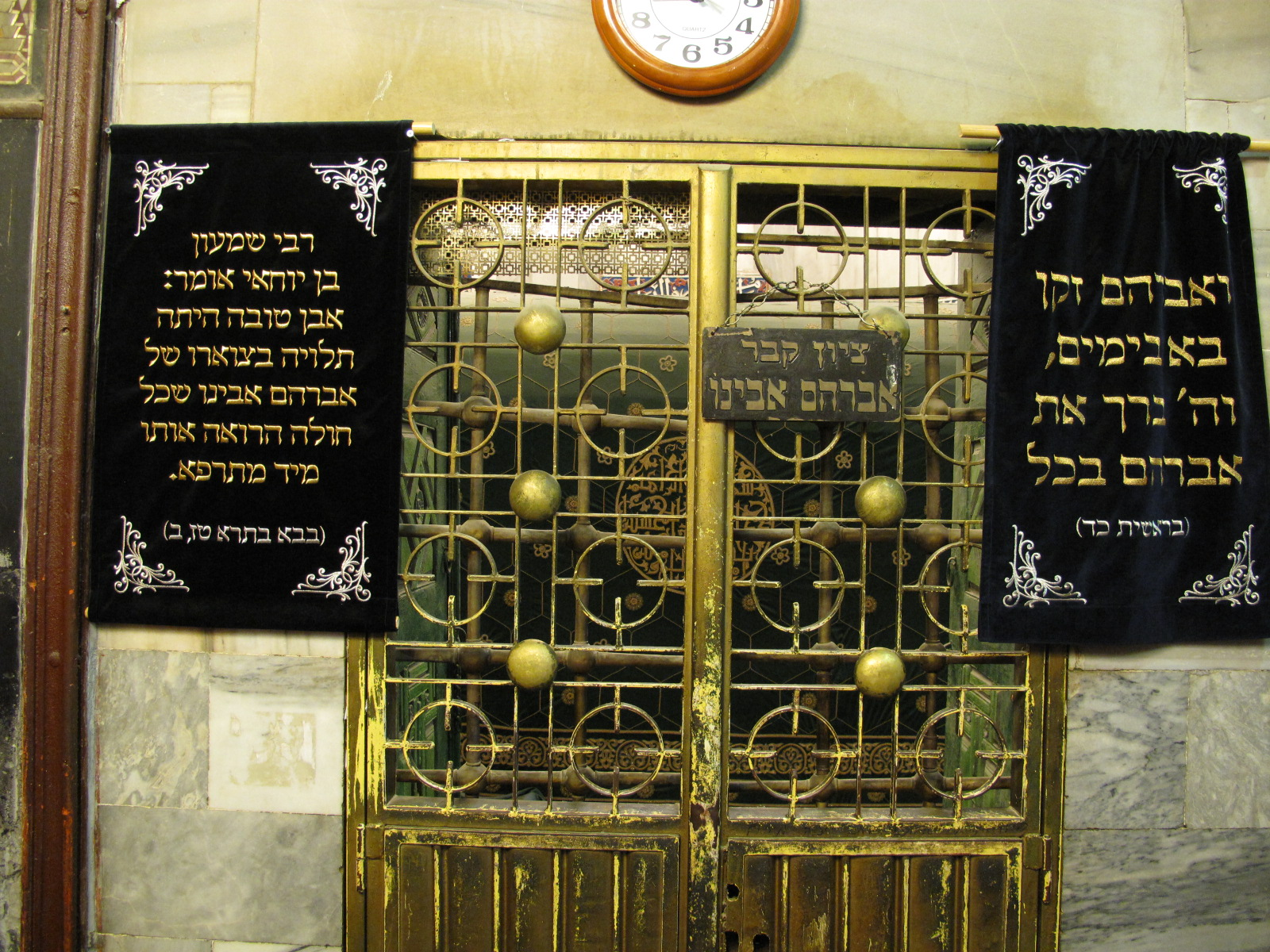
Tomb of Abraham

Jewish midrashic literature avows that, in addition to the patriarch couples, Adam, the first man, and his wife, Eve, were also interred in the Cave of the Patriarchs, a tradition supported by ancient Samaritan texts. The tradition is supported by the simple wording of Genesis 23:2, which refers to "Kiryat Arba... Hevron" ("arba" means 'four'). Commenting on that passage, Rashi listed the four couples chronologically, starting with Adam and Eve.

Another Jewish tradition tells that when Jacob was brought to be buried in the cave, Esau prevented the burial, claiming that he had the right to be buried in the cave; after some negotiation Naphtali was sent to Egypt to retrieve the document stating Esau sold his part in the cave to Jacob. As this was going on, Hushim, the son of Dan, and who was hard of hearing, did not understand what was transpiring, and why his grandfather was not being buried, so he asked for an explanation; after being given one he became angry and said: "Is my grandfather to lie there in contempt until Naphtali returns from the land of Egypt?" He then took a club and killed Esau, and Esau's head rolled into the cave. This implies that the head of Esau is also buried in the cave. Some Jewish sources record the selling of Esau's right to be buried in the cave—according to a commentary on the "Book of Exodus", Jacob gave all his possessions to acquire a tomb in the Cave of the Patriarchs. He put a large pile of gold and silver before Esau and asked, "My brother, do you prefer your portion of this cave, or all this gold and silver?" Esau's selling to Jacob his right to be buried in the Cave of the Patriarchs is also recorded in Sefer HaYashar.

An early Jewish text, the Genesis Rabbah, states that this site is one of three that enemies of Judaism cannot taunt the Jews by saying "you have stolen them," as it was purchased "for its full price" by Abraham.

According to the Midrash, the Patriarchs were buried in the cave because the cave is the threshold to the Garden of Eden. The Patriarchs are said not to be dead but "sleeping". They rise to beg mercy for their children throughout the generations. According to the Zohar, this tomb is the gateway through which souls enter into the Judaic afterlife of paradise; Gan Eden.

There are Hebrew prayers of supplication for marriage on the walls of the Sarah cenotaph.

=== Islam ===
Muslims believe that Muhammad visited Hebron on his nocturnal journey from Mecca to Jerusalem to stop by the tomb and pay his respects. For this reason the tomb quickly became a popular Islamic pilgrimage site. It was said that Muhammad himself encouraged the activity, saying "He who cannot visit me, let him visit the Tomb of Abraham" and "He who visits the Tomb of Abraham, Allah abolishes his sins."

According to one tradition, childless women threw petitions addressed to Sarah, known for giving birth at an advanced age, through a hole in the mosque floor to the caves below.

After the conquest of the city by Umar, this holy place was "simply taken over from the Jewish tradition" by the new rulers; the Herodian enclosure was converted into a mosque and placed under the control of a waqf. The waqf continues to maintain most of the site, while the Israeli military controls access to the site.

According to some Islamic sources the cave is also the tomb of Joseph. Though the Bible has Joseph buried in Shechem (the present-day Palestinian city of Nablus), Jewish aggadic tradition conserved the idea that he wished to be interred at Hebron, and the Islamic version may reflect this. The Jewish apocryphal book, The Testaments of the Twelve Patriarchs, also states that this is the burial place of Jacob's twelve sons.

According to some sources, the mosque is the 4th holiest in Islam; other sources rank other sites as 4th.

A Fatimid-era minbar is kept at the mosque. According to an Arabic inscription written on the minbar, it was commissioned by Fatimid vizier Badr al-Jamali during the reign of Caliph al-Mustansir when he discovered the head of Husayn ibn Ali in 1092 CE (448 AH) at Ascalon and kept it at a mosque and shrine there.

== See also ==
- Islam in Palestine
- Judaism in Palestine
- Christianity in Palestine
- List of mosques in Palestine
- List of burial places of founders of religious traditions
- List of World Heritage Sites in the State of Palestine
- The Cave – a 1993 multimedia opera set in the cave
- Tomb of the Matriarchs
