= Arbell =

Arbell is a surname. Notable people with the surname include:

- Lucy Arbell (1878–1947), French mezzo-soprano
- Michal Arbell-Tor (born 1955), Israeli literature researcher and academic

== See also ==
- Abell (surname)
- Abrell
