= Rav Karna =

Karna (Hebrew: קרנא) was a rabbi of Babylonia, of the first generation of amoraim. In the Babylonian Talmud he appears simply as Karna; in the Jerusalem Talmud he is entitled Rav Karna.

He was a colleague of Samuel of Nehardea and Rav, and served as a rabbinic judge. The phrase "Judges of the Exile" in the Babylonian Talmud is an epithet attributed to Karna and Samuel of Nehardea.

He wrote a compilation of Baraitas to Seder Nezikin, known as Nezikin of the School of Karna. He made his living from testing wine quality.
