= Dina d'malkhuta dina =

"The law of the land is the law", principle in Jewish religious law

Dina d'malkhuta dina (alternative spelling: dina de-malkhuta dina; Imperial Aramaic: דִּינָא דְּמַלְכוּתָא דִּינָא, lit. 'the law of the Government is law', or "the law of the land is the law") is a principle in Jewish religious law that the civil law of the country is binding upon the Jewish inhabitants of that country, and, in certain cases, is to be preferred to Jewish law. The law of the land and its binding on Jewish citizens pertains, however, exclusively to monetary matters. The concept of dina de-malkhuta dina is similar to the concept of conflict of laws in other legal systems. It appears in at least twenty-five places in the Shulchan Arukh.

The principle of dina d'malkhuta dina means that, for Jews, obedience to the civil law of the country in which they live is viewed as a religiously mandated obligation and disobedience is a transgression, according to Jewish law. This general principle is subject, however, to the qualifications that the government enacting the law must be one which is recognized by Jewish law as having legitimacy; the law must apply equitably to all the inhabitants, Jewish and non-Jewish alike; and the law must not contravene the spirit of the laws derived from the Torah even if a particular regulation may be contrary to a provision of Jewish law. Whenever a state law infringes upon a prohibition (Hebrew: איסור) outlined in the Torah, or else infringes upon a permitted thing (Hebrew: היתר) in the Torah, or even upon Jewish custom, the laws of Dina d'malkhuta dina do not apply.

== Origins ==
Origins of this idea come from Jeremiah's letter to the Babylonian exiles: "Seek the peace of the city to which I have exiled you and pray to the Lord on its behalf; for in the peace thereof you shall have peace" (Jeremiah 29:7). In the opinion of some, for the exiled Jews their submission to gentile rulers was viewed more as a "pragmatic recognition of brute force" than anything else. Yet it is surely a mark of something extraordinary in the message of Jeremiah that his advice goes beyond mere submission to necessity and requests prayer for the "peace (שָׁלוֹם)" of those among whom the exiles find themselves.

Others suggest that the authority of kings to enact binding laws upon the people and to exact imposts and duties stem from the biblical episode about crowning a king (1 Samuel 8:11–18).

The first to cite a teaching under the authority of Dina d'malkhuta dina, and who applied it to Jews who live under the laws of foreign lands, was Mar Samuel (ca. 177–257), a Talmudic sage from Babylonia.

Rabbi Hanina, who had been the Deputy High Priest before the Roman conquest of Jerusalem and the destruction of the Second Temple is cited in tractate Avot (Talmud, b. Avot 3:2) as saying: "Pray for the welfare of the government, for were it not for fear of it, people would swallow one another alive."

== Within the halakha and in the Talmud ==
The dina etc. (= "law of the land") was the only extraneous element that was incorporated into the halakhic law structure, the foundation of jurisdictional autonomy of Jewish communities, and applies to raising taxes, duties and imposts, on the condition that the exacter is fully authorized and does not exact more than what he is entitled to exact, as also to a government's right to determine ways of commerce. In cases of abuse, it was permitted to evade customs (import tax). By definition, the term would also apply to the king's ability to expropriate lands under the laws of eminent domain for the building of new roads for his army during war. Not only is he permitted to build a road for his army, but according to Shemuel, in virtue of the powers vested in the government or in the king, he has the authority to cut down another's date-palm trees and to make from them bridges, while persons making use of the bridge need not suspect that the original owners have not despaired of retrieving their lost property and are still in possession of the timbers, seeing that, in fact, they have despaired of retrieving what was formerly theirs. Included in the general scope of the term's definition are the legal deeds (conveyances) and documents held in non-Jewish courts of law and registries, which are viewed as valid. The statement dina de-malkhuta dina, appears four times in the Babylonian Talmud and is a nod to Jewish acquiescence to Gentile authority, as also to Jewish secular authority.

The term dina etc. (= "law of the land") not only applies to an Israelite or Jewish government, but also to non-Jewish governments where Jews are concerned and where the law of the government must be respected as the law of the Torah. The Talmud (Baba Batra 55a) notes that, in the case of the Persian government and its laws, title to land can be acquired by usucaption (occupancy) after forty years of occupancy by a farmer, during which years the farmer had not met up with any counter-claim or protest, although in Jewish law one gains title to property by usucaption after working it for only three years from date to date. In this case, Jews living in Persia were obligated to honor the law of the land. The novelty of the Persian law allows for the Persian farmer who gained possession of the property to sell the property to others, and even if it should later be learned that the property was stolen from its original owner (who had not protested his right to the property all these years), the person who buys the property—if confronted by its rightful owner who now lays claim to the property and demands that restitution be made—is not required to relinquish the property under Persian law, something which stands contrary to Jewish law (when the rightful owner has not despaired of retrieving his lost property), although valid by virtue of Dina d'malkhuta dina. Only in such places where Jewish law prevails would the original owner, in such cases, regain access to his stolen property, seeing that stolen property cannot be acquired by way of usucaption. Land purchased by a Jew from a non-Jew, the non-Jew must authenticate its purchase by showing a legal deed of title to the property.

== Application of the dina to Jews ==
While the majority of rabbis hold that Dina d'malkhuta dina applies to, both, Jewish and non-Jewish governments, Rabbi Nissim, who cites the Tosafists, dissented, saying that with respect to land-tax levied by a government on its subjects, such as in the case of the Persian king who was entitled to levy a land-tax upon his subjects, and those who defaulted in payment could have their property confiscated, or either mortgaged by mortgagers until payment has been made on the property (Baba Bathra 55a, Rashi s.v. טסקא), the rule of Dina d'malkhuta dina applies in their case, that is, only to non-Jewish kingdoms (forms of government) outside of the Land of Israel, but does not apply to Jewish kings and governors within the Land of Israel. According to Maimonides, the government of any country has the authority to levy a land-tax upon its subjects, and those who default in its payment could have their property confiscated from them, or either mortgaged by mortgagers until payment has been made.

The rabbis required "minimal justice" from non-Jewish rulers, as such for the dina to be accepted there were two stipulations. These stipulations were that laws had to be both explicit and universal, to safeguard Jews from gentile laws that could potentially be used against them.

A sovereign non-Jewish government, although given powers to levy taxes, etc., is not authorized to appoint a rabbi over the Jewish community without the approval of the majority of that community, unless the rabbi were erudite and possessed a retentive memory, as well as had exceptional reasoning faculties with acute penetration (Responsa of Rabbi Isaac ben Sheshet, responsum no. 271). If, however, a Jewish person appoints a rabbi over the community, without receiving prior approval from that community, such actions are regretful and he will be required to give an account for his actions (Responsa of Rabbi Shlomo ibn Aderet, responsum no. 637).

== Conditions of dina in civil and religious matters ==
The Rabbis created terms that could be easily used and identified for highlighting the jurisdiction of the dina (= "law of the land"), these mamona (civil and economic matters) were places where the dina could legitimately supersede even Torah law, and the isura (forbidden or religious matters) that the gentile laws could not be heeded against the Torah.

The Talmud (Baba Metzia 28b) relates a story about a point in time when the Persian government made it a law that any money found by one of its citizens automatically becomes property of the state. Rabbi Ammi and a colleague of his found lost money which its owners had, ostensibly, despaired of ever retrieving. The same rabbi knew the oral teaching which taught that he that finds lost money, where there is no indication or sign showing to whom it originally belonged and where its owner had despaired of retrieving the lost money, its finder becomes its new and lawful owner. Therefore, in total reliance on this oral teaching, he gave instruction not to relinquish the money they had found, nor give it to the Government. Since the Persian law contravened that of common Jewish law, the rabbi was able to ignore it, so long as he did not get caught in the act.

Medieval halakhists developed two approaches to the dina rule. First was the "contractual" theory where the laws of the ruling king are binding upon the subjects of the realm because they had agreed in advance to accept the king's laws. Maimonides and the Shulchan Arukh, the leading halakhic decisors (poskim), are the main proponents for this theory. Second is the "ownership" theory, where the Jews recognize the king's law as the land is his personal possession; this theory is supported by the Talmudic commentators (Ran and Tosafos)

== Application to modern Israel ==
In regards to modern Israel, there are those who allege that the Talmud cites the dina as applying only upon the laws of a Gentile government, while the sovereignty of a Jewish king, as applicable to the dina, is never cited in the Talmud. In the argument supporting the dina's applicability to the modern Jewish state, Tenbitsky, a commentator on this subject, presents the principle of niḥa lehū (Hebrew: ניחא להו), the Jewish community's acquiescence to governmental power for the sake of public order. Using this logic, the niḥa lehū can be applied to any legitimate governmental purposes such as taxes for national defense, and, therefore, the dina can be applied to a Jewish sovereign, as the necessary power cannot be denied as per niḥa lehū. However, under the "ownership theory" the dina cannot be applied to a Jewish sovereign in the land of Israel as all Jews own the land together, therefore a Jewish king or government, an equal landowner, would not be able to expel others from their domain.

=== Rabbinic courts vs. secular-state laws ===
Israel's inheritance laws are a direct carry-over from the British Mandate inheritance regulations of 1923, which stipulated that females and males had equal inheritance rights. However, in the Mosaic law, the inheritance is to be divided by the court equally among the sons of the deceased (the daughters being excluded from the inheritance, unless they were stipulated in his Last Will, or were his only offspring). According to the same Mosaic law, the firstborn of his sons receives a double portion of the divided inheritance.

Since rabbinic courts are unable to bypass the secular-law of the state, nor can they cancel the biblical laws, they circumvent the issue by encouraging the head of the family to write out a Last Will before his death, in which case, the father is able to bequeath a hefty portion of the inheritance of his estate to his eldest son. Conversely, if there was no Last Will made by the father before his death, when brothers and sisters come before a rabbinic court of law to settle their inheritance, the court, before issuing an Inheritance Order (Hebrew: צו ירושה), endeavors to convince the eldest son to willingly give-up part of his inheritance so that his sister(s) may receive a portion of the same, all having given their written consent in advance to the conditions, in which case, the court views the divided inheritance as a "gift", whilst the secular laws of the state have not been compromised.

== See also ==
- Hefker beth-din hefker
- Law of the land
- Lex loci rei sitae
- Lex loci delicti commissi
- Yiush
