= Abba bar Abba =

2nd/3rd century Babylonian Jewish Talmudist

- אבא בר אבא

Personal life
- Born: Babylonia
- Era: 2nd-3rd centuries
- Known for: Distinguished for piety, benevolence, and learning; father of Samuel of Nehardea
- Other names: Father of Samuel (אבוה דשמואל), Abba bar Ba (אבא בר בא)

Religious life
- Religion: Judaism

Senior posting
- Teacher: Judah haNasi
- Based in: Babylonia, Land of Israel

Abba bar Abba (Aramic: אבא בר אבא, or Father of Samuel, Aramic: אבוה דשמואל; Cited in the Jerusalem Talmud as Abba bar Ba, Aramic: אבא בר בא) was a Jewish Talmudist who lived in Babylonia in the 2nd–3rd centuries (first generation of amoraim).

== Biography ==
He was distinguished for piety, benevolence, and learning. He is known chiefly through his son Samuel of Nehardea, principal of the Academy of Nehardea, and is nearly always referred to as "Samuel's father". Abba traveled to Palestine, where he entered into relations with Judah haNasi, with whose pupil Levi bar Sisi he was on terms of intimate friendship. When Levi died, Abba delivered the funeral oration and glorified the memory of his deceased friend.
