= Hama bar Hanina =

3rd century Judean rabbi

Hama bar Hanina was a rabbi who lived in the Land of Israel in the 3rd century (second generation of amoraim).

== Biography ==
Like his father, Hanina bar Hama, he directed a school at Sepphoris, and was well known in the circles of the halakhists. He was a contemporary of Rabbi Yochanan.

Hama's ancestors were wealthy, and built many synagogues. On one occasion, while visiting the synagogues of Lod with his colleague Hoshaiah II, he proudly exclaimed, "What vast treasures have my ancestors sunk in these walls!" To this Hoshaiah responded, "How many lives have your ancestors sunk here! Were there no needy scholars whom that treasure would have enabled to devote themselves entirely to the study of the Law?"

== Teachings ==
He was distinguished as an aggadist, in which field he occupied a high position, aggadists like Levi frequently quoting him.

In his homilies, Hama sought to convey practical lessons. Thus, commenting on the Scriptural command, "Ye shall walk after the Lord your God", he asks, "How can man walk after God, of whom it is written, 'The Lord thy God is a consuming fire'?" But, he explains, the Bible means to teach that man should follow in God's ways. "As He clothes the naked, so do you clothe the naked."

According to Hama, death was inflicted upon Adam not so much because of his sin as to prevent wicked men in the future from proclaiming themselves immortal gods.
