= Levi ben Sisi =

Late 2nd/early 3rd century Jewish scholar

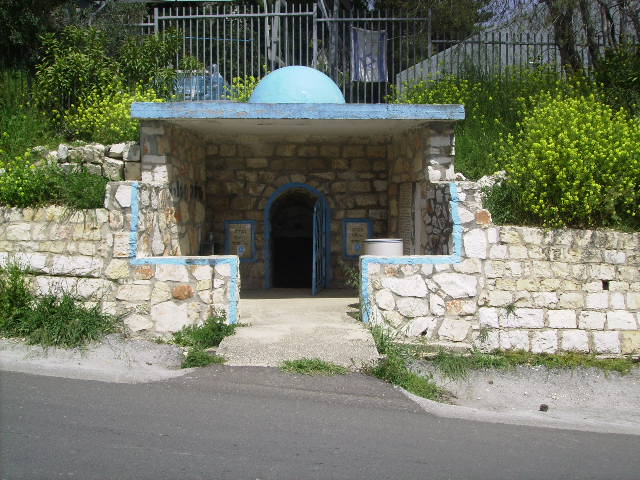
Alleged tomb of Levi and Yossi Bar Sisi, Sasa, Israel

Levi ben Sisi or Levi bar Sisi (Sisyi, Susyi, Hebrew: לוי בר סיסי) was a Jewish scholar, one of the semi-tannaim of the late 2nd century and early 3rd century.

== Biography ==
He was a student of the patriarch Judah haNasi, and studied together with Judah's son Simeon.

He assisted Judah in the compilation of the Mishnah, and composed his own collection of baraitot. Many of Levi's baraitot were eventually embodied in a compilation known as Kiddushin de-Bei Levi.

In the Babylonian Talmud Levi is seldom quoted with his patronymic, and neither in the Babylonian nor in the Jerusalem Talmud nor in the Midrashim is he quoted with the title of "Rabbi". Thus, one can determine whether the name "Levi" without a patronymic refers to Levi bar Sisi or to a younger namesake (Levi II) who is almost always cited as "R. Levi".

Although Levi bar Sisi is not given the title "Rav," he was highly esteemed among scholars. Where an anonymous passage is introduced with the statement למדין לפני חכמים (= "it was argued before the sages"), the implication is that the argument was advanced by Levi before Judah haNasi.

Judah haNasi later spoke of Levi bar Sisi as of an equal. At the request of a congregation at Simonias to send a man who could fulfill the duties of a preacher, judge, beadle, scribe and teacher, and supervise general congregational affairs, Judah sent Levi. When Levi took up his position, he failed to satisfy the first requirement. Questions of law and of exegesis were addressed to him, and he left them unanswered. The Simonias congregation charged the patriarch with sending someone unfit for the job, but he responded that Levi was as able as himself. He summoned Levi and asked the same questions, which Levi answered all correctly. Judah inquired why he did not do so before and Levi answered that his courage had failed him. A late midrash speaks of him as a Biblical scholar and fine preacher.

Several stories are told of his prayers in times of distress, which were immediately answered.

After Judah haNasi's death, Epes the Southerner was made head of the academy, which led Levi and Hanina bar Hama to avoid the academy. When Epes later died and Hanina became head of the academy, Levi moved to Babylonia, whither his fame had preceded him. He died in Babylonia, and was greatly mourned by scholars. Abba bar Abba eulogized him, saying that Levi alone was worth as much as the whole of humanity.
