= Abrell =

Abrell is a surname. Notable people with the surname include:

- Brad Abrell (1965–), American actor
- Charles G. Abrell (1931–1951), United States Marine and Medal of Honor recipient
- Dick Abrell (1892–1973), American football player
- Jakob Abrell (1935–2003), German author
- Elan Abrell (1978–), American anthropologist and author

== See also ==
- Abell (surname)
- Arbell
