= Hefker =

Term in Jewish law and modernist poetry

Hefker (Hebrew: הפקר) is ownerless property under rabbinic law. While some property is intrinsically ownerless, especially during shmita, ordinary property can also be made formally ownerless by written or express renunciation of its owner or by judicial action (as shown in Gittin 36b). Even absent such an action, property will become ownerless if the owner was a convert to Judaism who dies without Jewish heirs (as seen in Bava Batra 149a).

Hefker re-emerged in the early 20th century as a central symbol of social justice in European Hebrew and Yiddish literature.

== Types of hefker ==
=== Intrinsic hefker ===
One kind of property such as seas, rivers, and deserts, appears to be intrinsically ownerless and thus gets categorized as hefḳer. Similarly, hefker includes the trees of the forest, fish in the sea, and birds of the wilderness. This legal presupposition can be seen in the Jewish law code Shulchan Aruch (Ḥoshen Mishpaṭ, 273–274, with the gloss by Moses Isserles). This natural ownerless quality is reflected in a sugya (passage) from the Talmud, a foundational text for rabbinic law, that attributes ten ancient laws to Joshua upon entering Canaan (see Bava Kamma 81a).

The ownerless aspect of natural formations only applies to the property claims of Jews, or Christians, but not necessarily to kings and royalty, who exercise sovereign control of lakes, forests, and the like.

=== Renunciation ===
The renunciation of ownership in property, whether movable or immovable, in order to be valid must be made in the presence of three men (Nedarim 45a). The formula of such a renunciation is very simple: "This my property shall be hefḳer." If no one takes possession of the property during the first three days, the previous owner may retract his original statement, but not after that, although he can always acquire possession of it in the same manner as any one else (Nedarim 44a).

The renunciation is valid only when made in general terms, not when it is declared hefḳer only to a certain class and not to another class, as when one declares it hefḳer for the poor and not for the rich (Mishnah Peah 6:1, Bava Metsia 30b). It is disputed whether property can be made hefḳer if the owner abandons it to the world, except for one or two individuals.

Owners may renounce property for a period of time, such as the sabbath, during which others may take possession. There are rabbinic debates about whether owners can renounce property only for a limited set of potential recipients, such as designating an asset as abandoned for the poor and not for the wealthy.

=== Possession lost ===
In some cases, even absent a renunciation, property will become ownerless if it cannot be returned to the owner. Notably, property turns ownerless if the owner was a proselyte, a convert to Judaism, who dies without Jewish heirs (as seen in Bava Batra 149a). Likewise, property that is lost to sea, or similarly irretrievable, has the status of hefker. Talmudic literature mentions two other cases: chickens or certain other animals that escape the owner's possession and certain items that are forbidden to Jewish use (issur ha-na'ah), though this latter category is disputed among the rishonim rabbis.

== Acquisition of hefker ==
Hefker, of various types, is acquired by the first person who cares to take possession of it. With a few exceptions, the manner of acquiring is the same in case of hefḳer as in other cases (see Alienation and Acquisition).

While usufructuary possession for a period of time is sufficient to establish a claim to real estate when the claim is that it was sold or given away, such possession is not sufficient in the case of hefḳer, where possession must consist of actual acquisition of the object (Bava Batra 54a). Painting one portion of a wall in a house, or plowing a field with the intention of taking possession of it, is sufficient.

== Applications in rabbinic law ==
Hefker comes into play in many areas of halakha, since it is a characteristic of property. The concept matters to the priestly terumah offerings, tithes, and first-born animal gifts, laws of acquisition by sale or by gift, charity, sabbath rules, Passover chametz, agricultural produce during shmita (a sabbatical year), and property that causes harm, such as a goring ox. All the poor-laws that pertain to land are disregarded in the case of hefḳer property. If, however, the previous owner takes possession of it again, he is obliged to observe all those laws, except that of separating the tithes (ma'aser at Nedarim. 44a). One who has acquired possession of an ownerless ox need not make restitution for the injuries the ox had committed before he acquired it (Bava Ḳamma 13b).

== European Hebrew and Yiddish literature ==
In the early 20th Century, hefker became an important theme among European Jewish writers, including Hayim Nahman Bialik. By way of analogy to the legal concept of ownerless property, hefker was used to symbolize personal or societal abandonment, including 'abandon' in the sense of unfettered. "In Yiddish modernism hefker becomes a new mode of poetic identity that at once celebrates and suffers from this lack of belonging, combining a sense of freedom and homelessness," according to Naomi Brenner.

in 1901, Bialik used hefker in the title of a Hebrew poem: "I Have Not Found Light in the Unclaimed." In this poem, Bialik turns away from both Jewish sources and the "unclaimed" (hefker) foreign influences of Europe. He has to dig it out of his own heart, metaphorically speaking.

A Yiddish poet, Dovid Hofshteyn, started using hefker in his first book (1919), which for him meant freedom, from social convention and from historical heaviness, thereby making oneself receptive to new experiences. But he also uses hefker to express loss, as in his cycle of poems after 1919 pogroms in Kyiv.

For David Bergelson, hefker refers to expressionist poetry itself ("let loose (hefker)... the new poem has fired a shot" in 1922). Peretz Markish also uses the word for a kind of freedom, ("I am nobody's, I am hefker, without a beginning, without an end"). However, Abraham Nahum Stencl brings a more pained perspective in a 1924 poem, portraying an abandoned Jesus-figure on the cross: "Again and again / Storm and last rays of breath / And I am hefker / A crucified way-pointer / On crooked world corners!"

According to Brenner, "With hefker as the speaker's defining quality, the poem is stripped of all religious claims, portraying a Jesus who is neither identifiably Christian nor Jewish." The speaker can only observe the God-less world from their abandoned spot. Around the same time, hefker also served a prominent role in a Hebrew poem by Uri Zvi Greenberg. He was a critic of Europe and a Zionist, so hefker creates not only a mood of alienation, but also nods at action. ("At the edge of the paths I dug for you wells of blood, You called 'abandon' (hafker – a verbal form) to all who passed on their way to the night feast: A jug of Eastern sanctified wine drawn from the well here to shatter your thirst.") Greenberg does not only write of existential abandonment, but rather Jews abandoned by Europe in a wild night of taking Jewish blood.

== Contemporary use ==
Hefker remains an important concept in Jewish law. For example, dealing with valuables hidden in bequests to a yeshiva, J. David Bleich differentiates between hefker, which requires firm intention, and "despair" (yi'ush) over lost objects. Another example is found in Aaron Levine's analysis of competition constraints on a former employee, where hefker shows the extent of constraints, which some authorities suspend for analogies to unowned property.

In 2017, a Middle Eastern studies scholar, Noam Leshem, used the hefker principle of abandonment in a "conceptual framework" to understand the Israeli occupation of Palestinian territories.

== See also ==
- Hefker beth-din hefker
- Unowned property
- Res nullius
