= Ali Bey el Abbassi =

Spanish explorer (1767–1818)

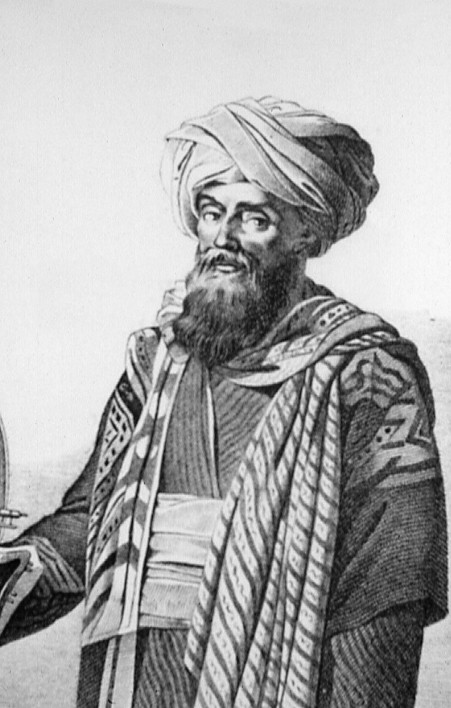
- The illustration of "Ali Bey" from the book of his travels
- Born: 1 April 1767; Barcelona, Spain
- Died: 30 August 1818; Syria, Ottoman Empire
- Occupation: Explorer

Domingo Francisco Jorge Badía y Leblich (Catalan pronunciation: [duˈmɛnək bəˈðiə j ləbˈlik]; 1767–1818), better known by his pseudonym Ali Bey el Abbassi (Arabic: علي باي العباسي, Alī Bay al-Abasī), was a Spanish explorer, soldier, and spy in the early 19th century. He supported the French occupation of Spain and worked for the Bonapartist administration, but he is principally known for his travels in North Africa and the Middle East. He witnessed the Saudi conquest of Mecca in 1807.

== Life ==
Badía was born in Barcelona on April 1, 1767. (Note: The Encyclopædia Britannica, 9th ed., gives his place of birth as "Biscay" in 1766. In modern times, scholars have demonstrated that he was a Catalan born in Barcelona.) After receiving a liberal education, he devoted particular attention to the Arabic language, which he learned in Vera, Almería, where his father was a military accountant, and in London. He also made a special study of the manners and customs of Arabian lands.

Under the assumed name of Ali Bey el Abbassi, Badía spent the two years from 1803 to 1805 in Morocco, entertained by its king while pretending to be a descendant of the Abbasid caliphs. He then went to Mecca—then under the possession of the Wahabites—in order to perform the hajj. On his way, he stopped in Tripoli, Cyprus, and Egypt. By pretending to be a Muslim, he was able to enter places forbidden to others, such as Mecca and the Cave of Machpelah at Hebron. On his way back, he visited Jerusalem and Syria before reaching Constantinople in the autumn of 1807. There, he was for the first time suspected of not being a real Muslim and fled to French-occupied Spain.

Having returned home in 1807, he declared his support for King Joseph I. He was appointed intendant of Segovia and then Cordoba. On the abdication of King José following the French defeat at Vitoria in 1813, Badía fled to France. In 1814, he published a French account of his travels in three volumes. An English translation was published in 1816. There was much mystery about Ali Bey, since the account was written from his persona. Bankes, writing in 1830, roundly asserted that he was a Jew, and many later writers have thought that he was a genuine Muslim of Moroccan origin but of Spanish education.

He set out on a second journey in 1818 under the assumed name of Ali Othman. He was said to have been acting as a French agent and, when he suddenly died at Aleppo on August 30, it was credited by some to poisoning. He was denied an Islamic burial because a cross was found in his vest.

== Legacy ==
Carrer Alí Bei, a street in Barcelona and Tangier, are named after him. A statue of him in Tangier was removed lately after knowing his true history.

The 2019 film De sable et de feu (Sand and Fire) is based on his story. It includes a close relationship with the famous Lady Hester Stanhope, but there is no evidence their paths ever crossed.

== See also ==
- French Campaign in Egypt and Syria
