= Hefker beth-din hefker =

Jewish legal term on the forfeiture of another's property

Hefker beth-din hefker (alternative spelling: hefker beit din hefker; Hebrew: הפקר בית דין הפקר), "that which is declared by a court ownerless property (hefker) is forthwith accounted ownerless property", is a principle in Jewish religious law that stipulates the right of a Jewish court of law in what regards jus in re aliena (lit. "right to another person's property"). The principle is derived from an episode in the Book of Ezra, where Ezra the Scribe commanded the Jewish people to return to their former country, threatening to confiscate the property of anyone who refuses to go-up to the Land of Israel, after having lived in exile.

The principle appears in the Talmud, being derived from the Mishnah, as well as from the Hebrew Bible, according to which a court may transfer property from its owners without legal or formal justification, as it deems fit.

Whosoever will not come within three days, according to the counsel of the princes and the elders, all his property will be confiscated, while he, himself, separated from the congregation of those that had been carried away.

== Implications ==
This principle has far-reaching consequences, since it is possible to formally uproot things, making the new reality binding upon all parties, in so far as the Mosaic Law is concerned, by changing the monetary status of the thing in question. Not only does the court have the power to cancel ownership of property and chattels, but the court is also authorized to convey ownership of same property to a different party, such as an heirloom or the inheritance rights of one family being given by the court to another family, or money that was thought to belong to one man being given, at the decree of a Jewish court of law, as property to another man. For example, according to this approach, the expropriation of money given by a man for his wife's betrothals, if a Jewish court should decide to take this route, it can make the money with which the husband consecrated his wife null and void, in which case the betrothals were, in retrospect, of no force whatsoever, seeing as the woman was betrothed by money and did not belong to the man who assayed to betroth her. Thus, by the power vested unto the Sages of Israel by this law, they are able to change the standard laws of inheritance prescribed in the Law of Moses (henceforth: Torah).

There is a deliberate debate as to whether a court can transfer an object from one person to another, or whether it can only remove an object into a state of being ownerless. Another discussion is about whether an act of taking possession as enacted by the Sages of Israel and whose validity is derived only from a rabbinic ordinance is considered a valid act of acquisition in matters directly affecting a biblical law or injunction, in what concerns a court ruling property as ownerless, so that the same property may now be used to betroth a woman. Most rabbinic scholars hold the view that, although the principle is taken from the Book of Ezra, the ruling is tantamount to a ruling taken from the Torah.

The Shitah Mekubezet explains that the court's power to dispense with a particular thing does not yet confer its ownership upon another. Rather, the court merely relinquishes the object from its first owners, and gives permission to another to acquire that object.

Based on this rule, Nissim of Gerona explained the possibility of judges who have not been ordained by rabbis that can trace a line of authority back to Moses as being able to engage partly in monetary matters. Rabbi Joseph Karo, citing the Tur, also permits a court to apply this principle whenever it deems it necessary to bring offenders into submission, even though the arbiters have not been ordained by the laying on of hands. While a court, under ordinary circumstances, has no power to uproot a prohibitive command from the Torah, except in cases where the intent is to bring instruction for a limited time only, in this case they are permitted to expropriate another's property without limitation, in order to instill correction where needed.

According to Maimonides, a court has the authority under Hefker beth-din hefker to fine a wicked husband, such that he pays to his wife the monies that he has pledged in her Ketubba, even before he divorces her, and even though he is still alive. Likewise, the court has the power to confiscate the property of a fellow Jew who abandoned his religion, and to give his property unto his law-abiding children. Such powers of the court do not require the judges to have been given semikhah in the classical sense.

This principle has also allowed others to justify the introduction of public regulations in Jewish communities, in terms of halacha. This justification was done by way of inference. First, the court has the ability to decide things that are not governed by a permanent law - the abandonment of property is just one example. Secondly, a court is an example of an institution that is agreed upon by the community and, hence, it can be said that the elected officials also meet this criterion and can therefore make an amendment to the Torah. That is, as long as they do not violate explicit prohibitions written in the Torah (excepting the provisions on monetary laws, which are permitted).

=== Examples of the law's implementation ===
The Tosefta (Sheḳalim 1:1) makes note of an early practice in Israel where the Beth Din would once annually, on the 15th day of the lunar month Adar, send forth emissaries throughout the country to check for kilayim, "mixed kinds" growing in people's vineyards and fields, and where, if kilayim were found growing together in a field or vineyard, the field or vineyard would be accounted as ownerless property, permitting others to enter that field and vineyard and to remove its crop.

== See also ==
- Confiscation
- Dina d'malkhuta dina
- Hefker
- Usucaption
