= Hanina bar Hama =

Babylonian Jewish Talmudist (died c.250)

- חנינא בר חמא
- Title: Rabbi

Personal life
- Died: c. 250; Sepphoris, Judea
- Known for: Talmudic scholarship

Religious life
- Religion: Judaism

Senior posting
- Teacher: Bar Kappara, Hiyya the Great, Judah haNasi
- Period in office: 3rd century CE (third generation of amoraim)
- Students: Johanan bar Nappaha, Eleazar II

Hanina bar Hama (died c. 250) (Hebrew: חנינא בר חמא) was a Jewish Talmudist, halakhist and aggadist frequently quoted in the Babylonian and the Jerusalem Talmud, and in the Midrashim.

He is generally cited by the name R. Hanina, but sometimes with his patronymic (Hanina b. Hama), and occasionally with the cognomen "the Great".

== Biography ==
Whether he was a Judean by birth and had only visited Babylonia, or whether he was a Babylonian immigrant in Judea, cannot be clearly established. In the only passage in which he mentions his arrival in Judea he refers also to his sons accompanying him, and from this some argue that Babylonia was his native land. It is certain, however, that he spent most of his life in Judea, where he attended for a time the lectures of Bar Kappara and Hiyya the Great and eventually joined the academy of Judah haNasi. Under Judah, he acquired great stores of practical and theoretical knowledge, and so developed his dialectical powers that once in the heat of debate with his senior and former teacher Hiyya he ventured the assertion that were some law forgotten, he could himself re-establish it by argumentation.

=== Relations with Judah I ===
Judah thought highly of him, and chose him in preference to his other disciples to spend time with him. Thus when Antoninus once visited Judah, he was surprised to find Hanina in the chamber, though the patriarch had been requested not to permit any one to attend their interview. The patriarch soothed his august visitor by the assurance that the third party was not an ordinary man. No doubt Hanina would have been early promoted to an honourable office had he not offended the patriarch by an ill-judged exhibition of his own superior familiarity with scriptural phraseology (see Hamnuna of Babylonia). However, the patriarch, on his death-bed, instructed Gamaliel, his son and prospective successor, to put Hanina at the head of all other candidates. Hanina modestly declined advancement at the expense of his senior, Epes the Southerner, and even resolved to permit another worthy colleague, Levi ben Sisi, to take precedence. Efes was the principal of the academy for several years, but Sisi withdrew from the country, at which time Hanina assumed the long-delayed honours. He continued his residence at Sepphoris, where he became the acknowledged authority in halakhah, and where he also practiced as a physician.

=== His unpopularity ===
According to Hanina, 99% of fatal diseases result from colds, and only 1% from other troubles. He therefore would impress mankind with the necessity of warding off colds, the power to do so, he taught, having been bestowed upon man by Providence. But neither his rabbinical learning nor his medical skill gained him popularity at Sepphoris. When a pestilence raged there, the populace blamed Hanina for failing to stamp it out. Hanina heard their murmurs and resolved to silence them. In the course of a lecture, he remarked, "Once there lived one Zimri, in consequence of whose sin twenty-four thousand Israelites lost their lives; in our days there are many Zimris among us, and yet ye murmur!"

On another occasion, when drought prevailed, the murmurs of the Sepphorites again became loud. A day was devoted to fasting and praying, but no rain came, though at another place, where Joshua ben Levi was among the supplicants, rain descended; the Sepphorites therefore made this circumstance a reflection on the piety of their great townsman. Another fast being appointed, Hanina invited Joshua ben Levi to join him in prayer. Joshua did so, but no rain came. Then Hanina addressed the people: "Joshua ben Levi does not bring rain down for the Southerners, neither does Hanina keep rain away from the Sepphorites: the Southerners are soft-hearted, and when they hear the word of the Law, they humble themselves, while the Sepphorites are obdurate and never repent".

=== His family and pupils ===
Hanina had a son, ShibHat or ShikHat, who died young, and another, Hama, who inherited his father's talents and became prominent in his generation. One of his daughters was the wife of a scholar, Samuel b. Nadav. Another daughter died during Hanina's lifetime, but he shed no tears at her death, and when his wife expressed astonishment at his composure he told her that he feared the effects of tears on his sight.

He lived to be very old, and retained his youthful vigour to the last. He attributed his extraordinary vitality to the hot baths and the oil with which his mother had treated him in his youth. He recognized his longevity as a reward for the respect he had shown his learned elders.

Among his pupils were Johanan ben Nappaha and Eleazar II, both of whom became rabbinical authorities in Hanina's lifetime. One morning, while walking, leaning on the arm of an attendant, Hanina noticed throngs of people hurrying toward a certain place. In answer to his inquiry, he was informed that R. Johanan was to lecture at the academy of R. Benaiah, and that the people were flocking there to hear him. Hanina thereupon exclaimed, "Praised be the Lord for permitting me to see the fruit of my labours before I die".

== Teachings ==
As an aggadist, Hanina was prolific and resourceful and often epigrammatic. Among his aphorisms were:

- "Everything is determined by Heaven, except one's fear of Heaven." He bases this doctrine of free will on the Scriptural dictum, "And now, Israel, what does the Lord thy God require (Hebrew שאל = "request") of you, but to fear the Lord thy God"
- With reference to Psalms 73:9, "They set their mouth against the heavens, and their tongue walks through the earth," he says, "In general, man sins either against the sojourner on earth or against Heaven, but the evil-tongued sins against both".
- "Whoever says that God is indulgent (that is, leaves sin unpunished) will find the reverse in his own life's experience; God is long-suffering, but 'his work is perfect: for all his ways are judgment'".

He predicted everlasting punishment for he who seduces a married woman, or he who publicly puts his neighbour to shame, or he who calls his neighbour by a nickname.
