= Epes the Southerner =

Epes the Southerner (Hebrew: אפס הדרומי, romanized: Efes ha-Daromi), or Rabbi Epes, was a scholar of the 3rd century, secretary to the patriarch Judah ha-Nasi, and one of the last tannaim. After Judah's death, while Efes conducted a college in southern Judea, on account of which he was called "'Efes (in the Jerusalem Talmud, "Pas") the Southerner", he was made head of the academy at Sepphoris, although the dying patriarch had ordered the appointment of Hanina bar Hama to that position. Hanina refused to supersede Efes, who was his senior by two years and a half.

Hoshaiah Rabbah was one of his disciples, and reported in his name several aggadic remarks, among them one bearing on Isaiah 60:3: "Nations shall walk by thy light," from which he argues that Jerusalem will in the future become a torch by the light of which people will walk. Hoshaiah also reported a civil law in Efes' name, and Shimon ben Lakish asked him a question of halacha.

Efes did not survive Judah ha-Nasi by many years. He was succeeded by Hanina ben Hama.
