= Michal Arbell-Tor =

Writer and literature lecturer

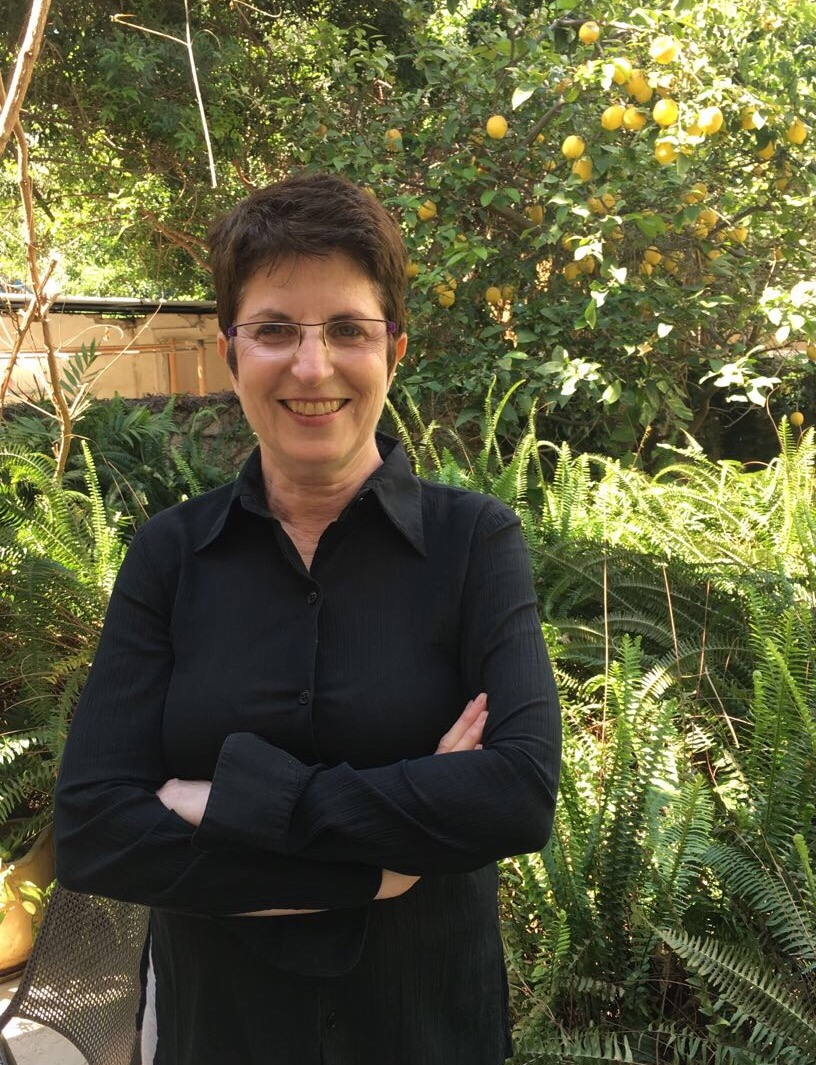
Arbel in 2017

Michal Arbel-Tor (Hebrew: מיכל ארבל-תור) is a researcher of Israeli literature and a lecturer in Hebrew literature at Tel Aviv University.

== Childhood ==
Arbel was born on July 27, 1955 in Jerusalem, the daughter of Hana Arbel, a physicist, and Yehuda Arbel, a police officer and pilot. She attended the Rehavia Hebrew Gymnasium High School, served in the IDF as a clerk, and studied Hebrew literature and philosophy at the Hebrew University of Jerusalem and graduated with a bachelor's degree with honors.

Her father Yehuda Arbel was a decorated pilot who served the Israeli Air Force for years, helping bring the Douglas DC-3 Dakota aircraft to Israel, and also led an Israeli rescue mission to help victims of an earthquake in Turkey. In the 1960s, he headed the Israeli Security Agency' Jerusalem District.

== Career ==
Arbel began teaching literature at a high school in Jerusalem. She received a doctorate for her work on the writings of S. Y. Agnon, Israel's first Nobel Prize laureate. She taught at University of Cambridge and for five years at Ben-Gurion University. She then began her position at Tel Aviv University.

She has written two books and multiple research articles on Hebrew literature.

Since 2007 Arbel has been the editor of the Suspicion series of detective stories and suspense novels.

== Published works ==
=== Books ===
- Written on the Dog's Skin: On the Concept of the Works of S.Y. Agnon. Ben-Gurion University of the Negev, 2006
- Over and done? On the ways of ending in fiction. Kibbutz Ha'Echad Publishing, 2008

=== Editor ===
- Gidi Nebo, Michal Arbel, Michael Gluzman (editors), Times of Change: Jewish Literature in the Modern Period: A Collection of Essays in Honor of Dan Miron, Ben-Gurion Institute for the Study of Israel and Zionism, Ben-Gurion University of the Negev, 2008.
- Michael Gluzman, Michal Arbel, Uri Cohen (editors), Letter: A Journal of Literature and Theory (since 2010).

=== Articles ===
- Writing as a gravestone: romance and historiosophy in the stories of S. Y. Agnon, Mekhin 2, July 2001, pp. 65–94
- 'I wanted to say something and I couldn't': the relationship between speech and non-speech, between author and reader in the stories 'Aviv Ker' and 'Kitty' LaAppelfeld', Mehkan 5, 2005, pp. 119–132
- "'Three Sisters': The Final Wish and Request for Consolation in Agnon's Work", Jewish Studies 42, 2004, pp. 207–240
- "Masculinity and Nostalgia: A Reading of Moshe Shamir's 'He Walked in the Fields' Against the Background of His Contemporaries", Jewish Studies 39, 2019, pp. 53–66. (The article is available for viewing in the JSTOR database after registration)
- "'Monastery of the Silence': The Rise of the Jobnik and the Challenging of the Fighting Masculine Identity", Jerusalem Studies in Hebrew Literature 20566, pp. 285–307. (The article is available for viewing in the JSTOR database after registration)
- "Mandeli bookseller: the problem of the novel and the problem of its ending" - Criticism and Commentary 43 ("On the brink: liminality in literature and culture"), 2010, pp. 63–100.
- "The sad cantor Miriam Deborah and other cantors in Agnon's stories: 'the cantors', 'according to the sorrow of the reward'" - Ian Giml , a journal for the study of Agnon's work 2, 2012, pp. 108–130 (the website is open for reading).
- "Writing Secularism" in: Secularization Processes in Jewish Culture, edited by Avriel Bar-Levav, Ron Margolin and Shmuel Feiner, The Open University, 2013, Volume I, pp. 347–520.
- The murderers: "In the forest and in the city" and "The mistress and the peddler" by S. Agnon, Author: Journal of Literature and Theory 3, 2013, 153-119 (open for reading on the website of the Kip Center for the Study of Hebrew Literature and Culture - Tel Aviv University).
- The Song of the Sea: On the "Pledge of Allegiance" and "In the Heart of Days", Aut : A Journal of Literature and Theory 6, 2016, pp. 215–255.
- Abba Kovner: The Ritual Function of His Battle Missives ("dapey krav") - Jewish Social Studies Vol 3 No.18 (special issue: "The 48 War: History and Responsibility") 2013, pp. 99–119

About her writings :

- Tamar Marin, What Is Yitzhak Komar Doing When He Writes "Mad Dog" on Black's Back, Haaretz website, November 27, 2006

== Cave of the Patriarchs ==
In 1968, her father, at the request of Minister of Defense Moshe Dayan, asked her to help excavate the Cave of Machpela, ancient burial site of the Biblical Patriarchs and Matriarchs. The site was barred to non-Muslims for 700 years and only became accessible to others after the Six Day War. Dayan believed that if a separate entrance could be found, Muslim worshipers could use the existing upper area and Jewish worshipers would use the caves below. 12-year-old Arbel was the only person small enough to fit through the small opening into the caverns.

Arbel wrote in her journal:

Ropes were tied round me, I was given a torch and matches (to test the air below) and I was lowered. I landed on a heap of papers and money-bills. I found myself in a square room. Opposite me were three tombstones, the middle one higher and more decorated than the other two ... They released more rope and I went through the opening, and found myself walking through a low, narrow corridor whose walls were cut out of the rock.

Her description of the cave and the photographs she took were presented to Dayan, who wrote of her:

she was a bright and courageous little girl who was unafraid not only of ghosts and spirits - their existence was not proven, she said - but also of snakes and scorpions, which were a very real danger ... Although we did not find the opening we were looking for, I am sure that the chronicles of Israel will record with pride this visit of Michal, the first visit by a Jew to this site in seven hundred years.
