= Vayeira =

4th weekly Torah portion in the annual Jewish cycle of Torah reading

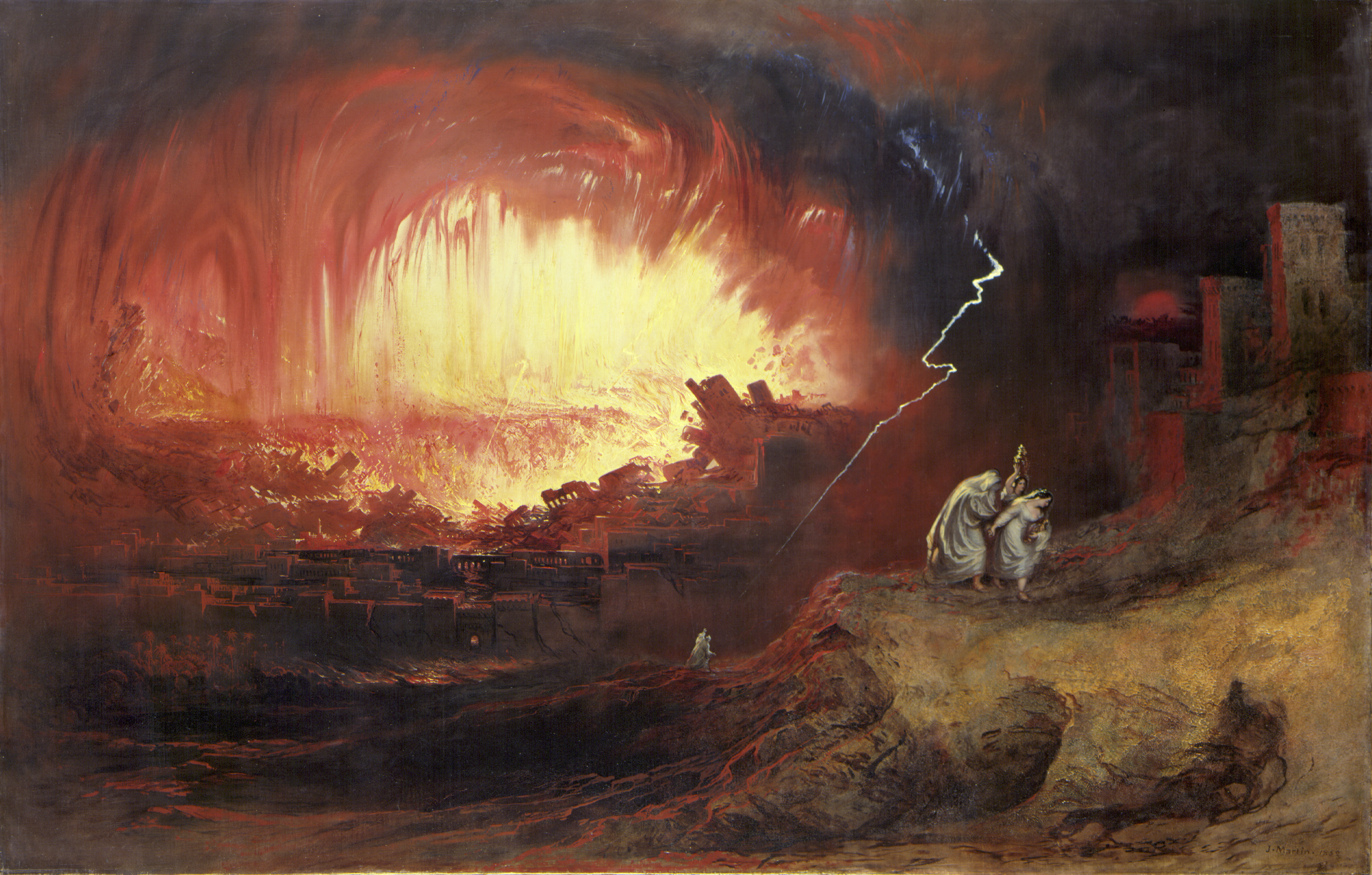
The Destruction of Sodom and Gomorrah (1852 painting by John Martin)

Vayeira, Vayera, or Va-yera (וַיֵּרָא—Hebrew for "and He appeared," the first word in the parashah) is the fourth weekly Torah portion (פָּרָשָׁה, parashah) in the annual Jewish cycle of Torah reading. It constitutes Genesis 18:1–22:24. The parashah tells the stories of Abraham's three visitors, Abraham's bargaining with God over Sodom and Gomorrah, Lot's two visitors, Lot's bargaining with the Sodomites, Lot's flight, the destruction of Sodom and Gomorrah, how Lot's daughters became pregnant by their father, how Abraham once again passed off his wife Sarah as his sister, the birth of Isaac, the expulsion of Hagar, disputes over wells, and the binding of Isaac (הָעֲקֵידָה, the Akedah).

The parashah has the most words (but not the most letters or verses) of any of the weekly Torah portions in the Book of Genesis, and its word-count is second only to Parashat Naso in the entire Torah. It is made up of 7,862 Hebrew letters, 2,085 Hebrew words, 147 verses, and 252 lines in a Torah Scroll (Sefer Torah). (In the Book of Genesis, Parashat Miketz has the most letters, and Parashiyot Noach and Vayishlach have the most verses.)

Jews read it on the fourth Sabbath after Simchat Torah, in October or November. Jews also read parts of the parashah as Torah readings for Rosh Hashanah. Genesis 21 is the Torah reading for the first day of Rosh Hashanah, and Genesis 22 is the Torah reading for the second day of Rosh Hashanah. In Reform Judaism, Genesis 22 is the Torah reading for the one day of Rosh Hashanah.

== Readings ==
In traditional Sabbath Torah reading, the parashah is divided into seven readings (עליות, aliyot). In the Masoretic Text of the Tanakh (Hebrew Bible), Parashat Vayeira has four "open portion" (פתוחה, petuchah) divisions (roughly equivalent to paragraphs, often abbreviated with the Hebrew letter פ (peh)). Parashat Vayeira has two further subdivisions, called "closed portion" (סתומה, setumah) divisions (abbreviated with the Hebrew letter ס (samekh)) within the first open portion. The first open portion, petuchah) spans the first five readings. The second open portion coincides with the sixth reading. The third open portion covers the binding of Isaac, which is most of the seventh reading, excluding only the concluding maftir (מפטיר) reading. And the fourth open portion coincides with the concluding maftir reading. Closed portion divisions further divide the long fourth reading.

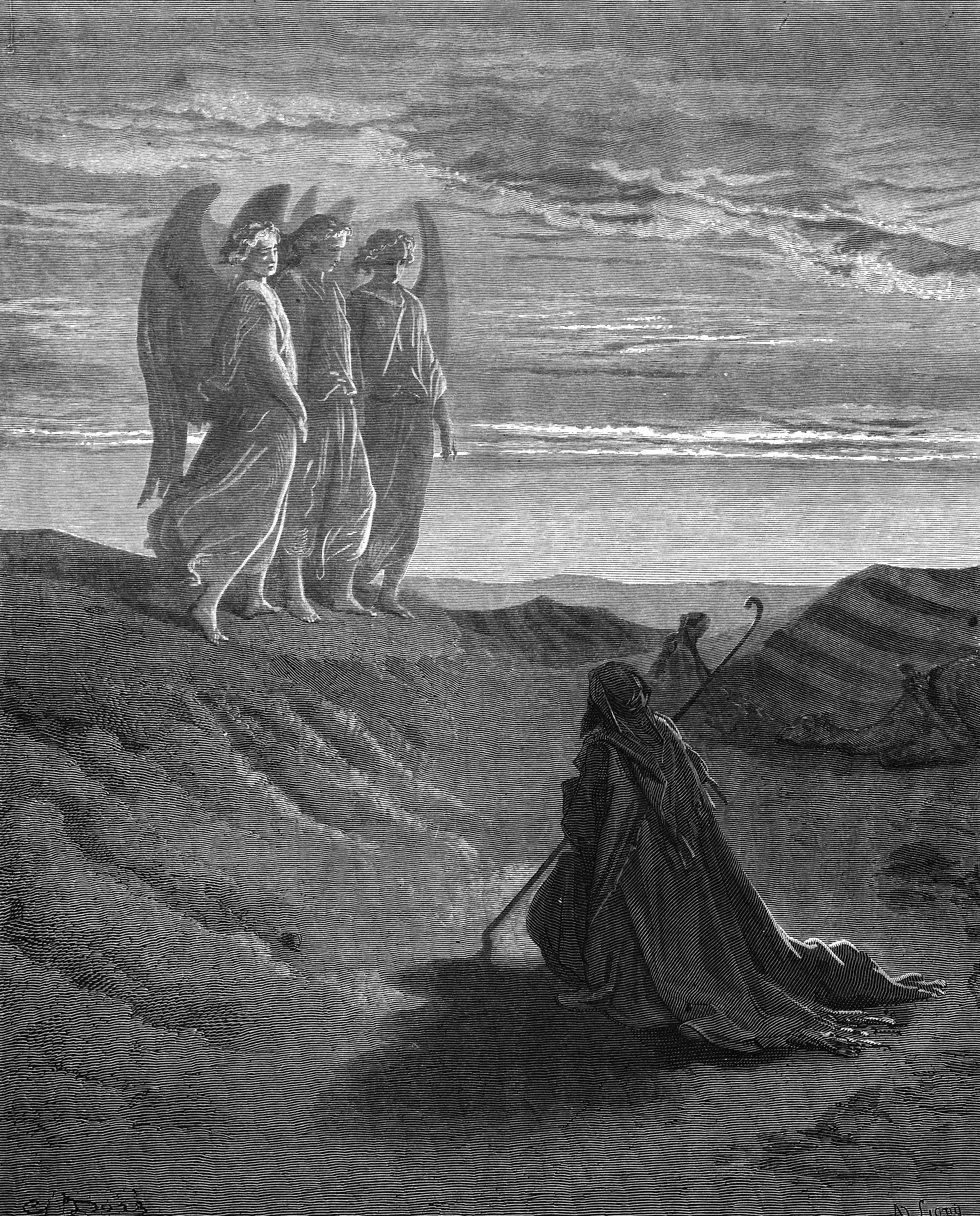
Abraham and the Three Angels (engraving by Gustave Doré from the 1865 La Sainte Bible)

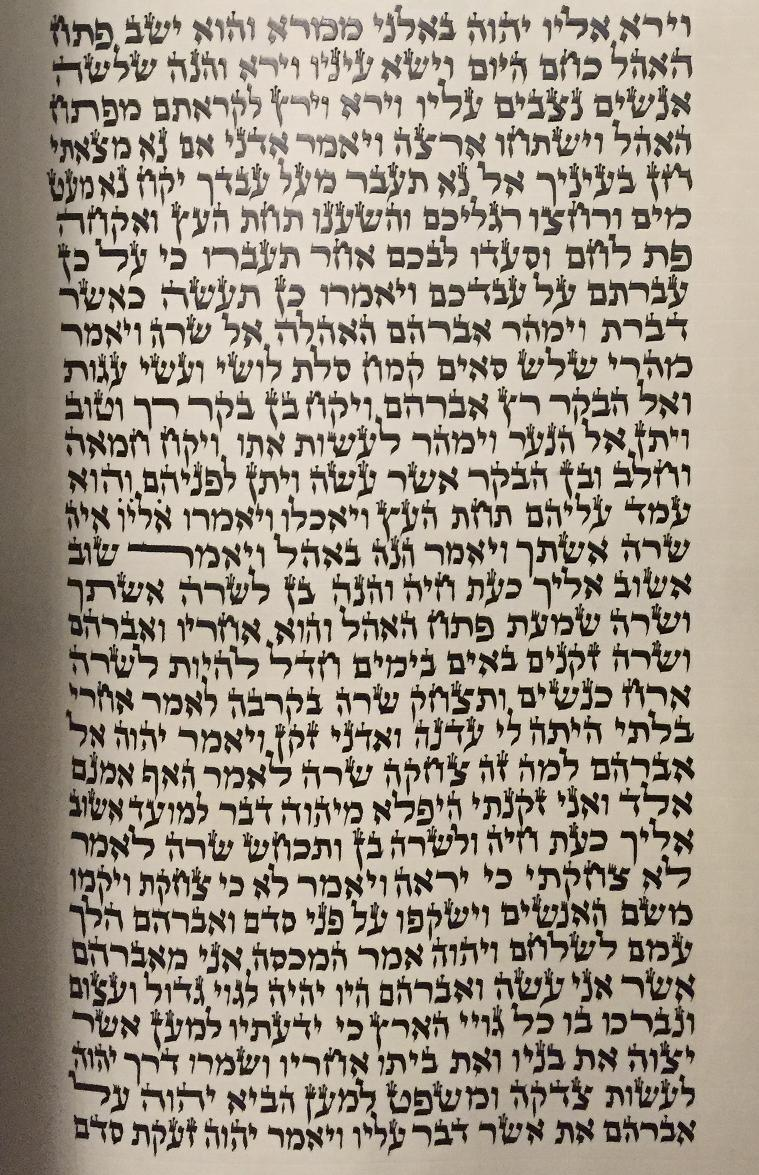
The beginning of Parashat Vayeira. Note the dots above the word אֵלָיו roughly halfway down on the left.

=== First reading – Genesis 18:1–14 ===
In the first reading, as Abraham was sitting in the entrance of his tent by the terebinths of Mamre in the heat of the day, he looked up and saw God in the form of three men. He ran, bowed to the ground, and greeted them, offering to wash their feet and fetch them a morsel of bread, to which they assented. Abraham rushed to Sarah's tent to order cakes made from choice flour, ran to select a choice calf for a servant-boy to prepare, set curds and milk and the calf before them, and waited on them under the tree as they ate. (In Genesis 18:9, there are dots above the letters א, ל, and ו in "They said to him".)

One of the visitors told Abraham that he would return the next year, and Sarah would have a son, but Sarah laughed to herself at the prospect, with Abraham being so old. God then asked Abraham why Sarah had laughed at bearing a child at her age, noting that nothing was too wondrous for God. The first reading ends here.

=== Second reading – Genesis 18:15–33 ===
In the second reading, frightened, Sarah denied laughing, but God insisted that she had. The men set out toward Sodom, and Abraham walked with them to see them off. God considered whether to confide in Abraham what God was about to do, since God had singled out Abraham to become a great nation and instruct his posterity to keep God's way by doing what was just and right. God told Abraham that the outrage and sin of Sodom and Gomorrah was so great that God was going to see whether they had acted according to the outcry that had reached God. The men went on to Sodom, while Abraham remained standing before God. Abraham pressed God whether God would sweep away the innocent along with the guilty, asking successively if there were 50, or 45, or 40, or 30, or 20, or 10 innocent people in Sodom, would God not spare the city for the sake of the innocent ones, and each time God agreed to do so. When God had finished speaking to Abraham, God departed, and Abraham returned to his place. The second reading ends here with the end of chapter 18.

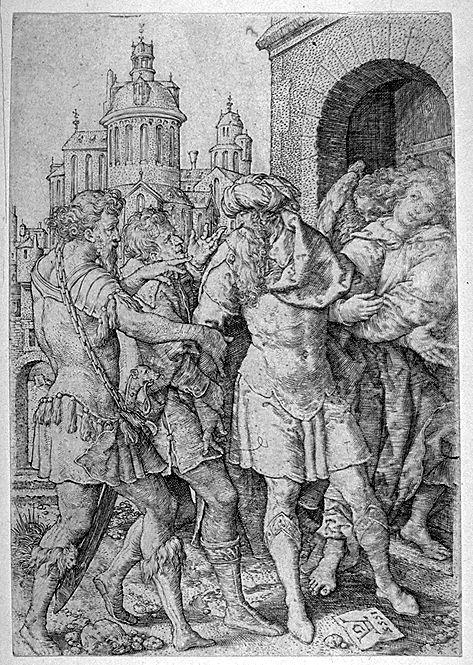
Lot prevents violence against the Angels (1555 engraving by Heinrich Aldegrever)

=== Third reading – Genesis 19:1–20 ===
In the third reading, as Lot was sitting at the gate of Sodom in the evening, the two angels arrived, and Lot greeted them and bowed low to the ground. Lot invited the angels to spend the night at his house and bathe their feet, but they said that they would spend the night in the square. Lot urged them strongly, so they went to his house, and he prepared a feast for them and baked unleavened bread, and they ate. Before they had retired for the night, all the men of Sodom gathered about the house shouting to Lot to bring his visitors out so that they might be intimate with them. Lot went outside the entrance, shutting the door behind him, and begged the men of Sodom not to commit such a wrong. Lot offered the men his two virgin daughters, if they would not do anything to his guests, but they disparaged Lot as one who had come as an alien and now sought to rule them, and they pressed threateningly against him. But the visitors stretched out their hands and pulled Lot back into the house and shut the door and struck the people with blindness so that they were unable to find the door. The visitors directed Lot to bring what family he had out of the city, for they were about to destroy the place, because the outcry against its inhabitants had become so great. So Lot told his sons-in-law that they needed to get out of the place because God was about to destroy it, but Lot's sons-in-law thought that he was joking. As dawn broke, the angels urged Lot to flee with his wife and two remaining daughters, but still he delayed. So out of God's mercy, the men seized Lot, his wife, and daughters and brought them out of the city, telling them to flee for their lives and not to stop or look back anywhere in the plain. But Lot asked them whether he might flee to a little village nearby. The third reading ends here.

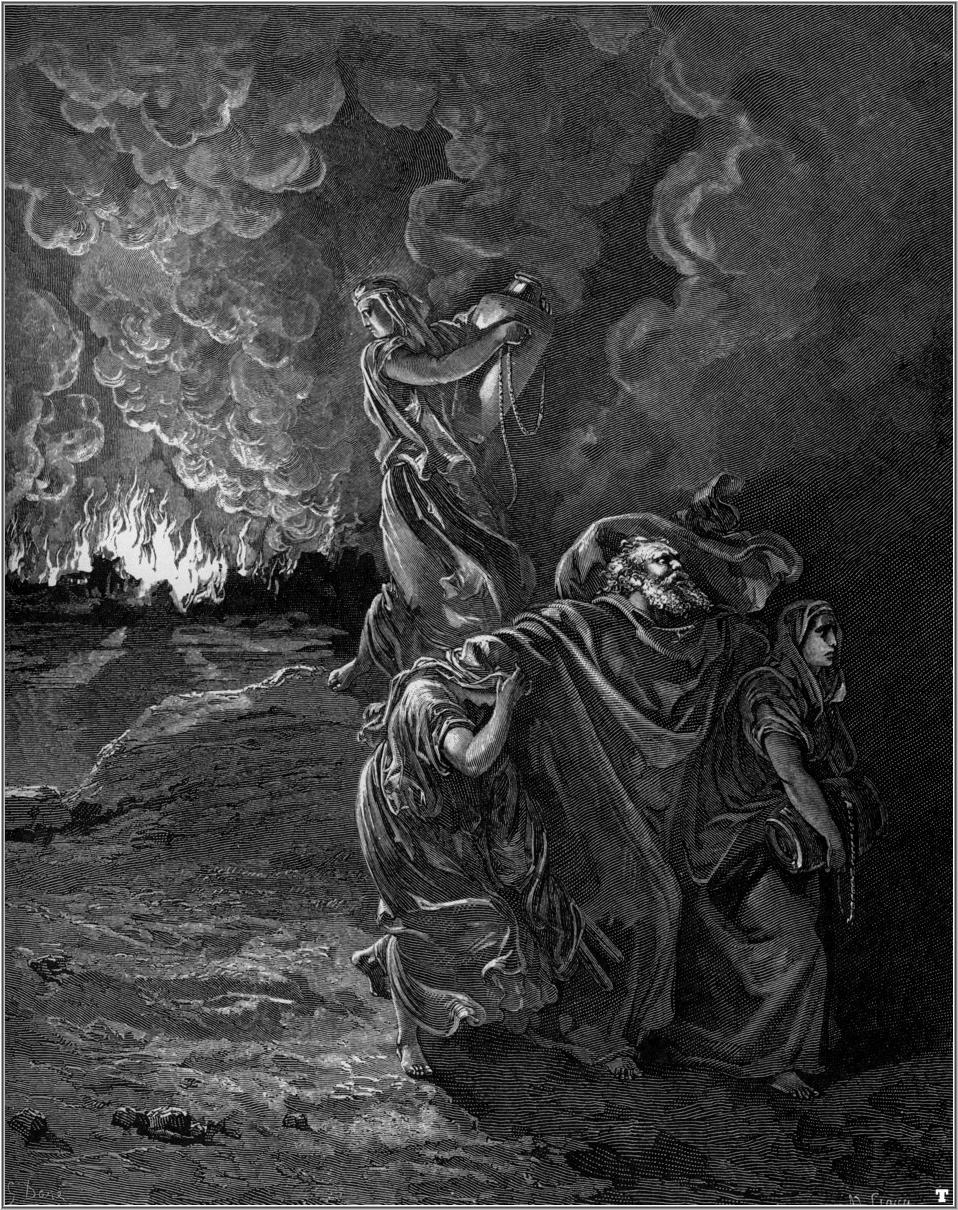
Flight of Lot (engraving by Gustave Doré from the 1865 La Sainte Bible)

=== Fourth reading – Genesis 19:21–21:4 ===
In the long fourth reading, the angel replied that he would grant Lot this favor too, and spare that town. The angel urged Lot to hurry there, for the angel could not do anything until he arrived there, and thus the town came to be called Zoar. As the sun rose and Lot entered Zoar, God rained sulfurous fire from heaven on Sodom and Gomorrah and annihilated the entire plain. Lot's wife looked back and turned into a pillar of salt. The next morning, Abraham hurried to the place where he had stood before God and looked down toward Sodom and Gomorrah and saw the smoke rising like at a kiln. Lot was afraid to dwell in Zoar, so he settled in a cave in the hill country with his two daughters. The older daughter told the younger that their father was old, and there was not a man on earth with whom to have children, so she proposed that they get Lot drunk and have sex with him so that they might maintain life through their father. That night they made their father drink wine, and the older one lay with her father without his being aware. And the next day the older one persuaded the younger to do the same. The two daughters thus had children by their father, the older one bore a son named Moab who became the father of the Moabites, and the younger bore a son named Ben-ammi who became the father of the Ammonites. A closed portion ends here with the end of chapter 19.

As the reading continues in chapter 20, Abraham settled between Kadesh and Shur. While he was sojourning in Gerar, Abraham said that Sarah was his sister, so King Abimelech had her brought to him, but God came to Abimelech in a dream and told him that taking her would cause him to die, for she was married. Abimelech had not approached her, so he asked God whether God would slay an innocent, as Abraham and Sarah had told him that they were brother and sister. God told Abimelech in the dream that God knew that Abimelech had a blameless heart, and so God had kept him from touching her. God told Abimelech to restore Abraham's wife, since he was a prophet, and he would intercede for Abimelech to save his life, which he would lose if he failed to restore her. Early the next morning, Abimelech told his servants what had happened and asked Abraham what he had done and why he had brought so great a guilt upon Abimelech and his kingdom. Abraham replied that he had thought that Gerar had no fear of God and would kill him because of his wife, and that she was in fact his father's daughter though not his mother's, so he had asked of her the kindness of identifying him as her brother. Abimelech restored Sarah to Abraham, gave him sheep, oxen, and slaves, and invited him to settle wherever he pleased in Abimelech's lands. Abimelech told Sarah that he was giving Abraham a thousand pieces of silver to serve her as vindication before all. Abraham then prayed to God, and God healed Abimelech and the women in his household, so that they bore children, for God had stricken the women with infertility because of Sarah. Another closed portion ends here with the end of chapter 20.

As the reading continues in chapter 21, God visited Sarah, as promised in chapter 18, and she bore Abraham a son as God had predicted, and Abraham named him Isaac. Abraham circumcised Isaac when he was eight days old. The fourth reading ends here.

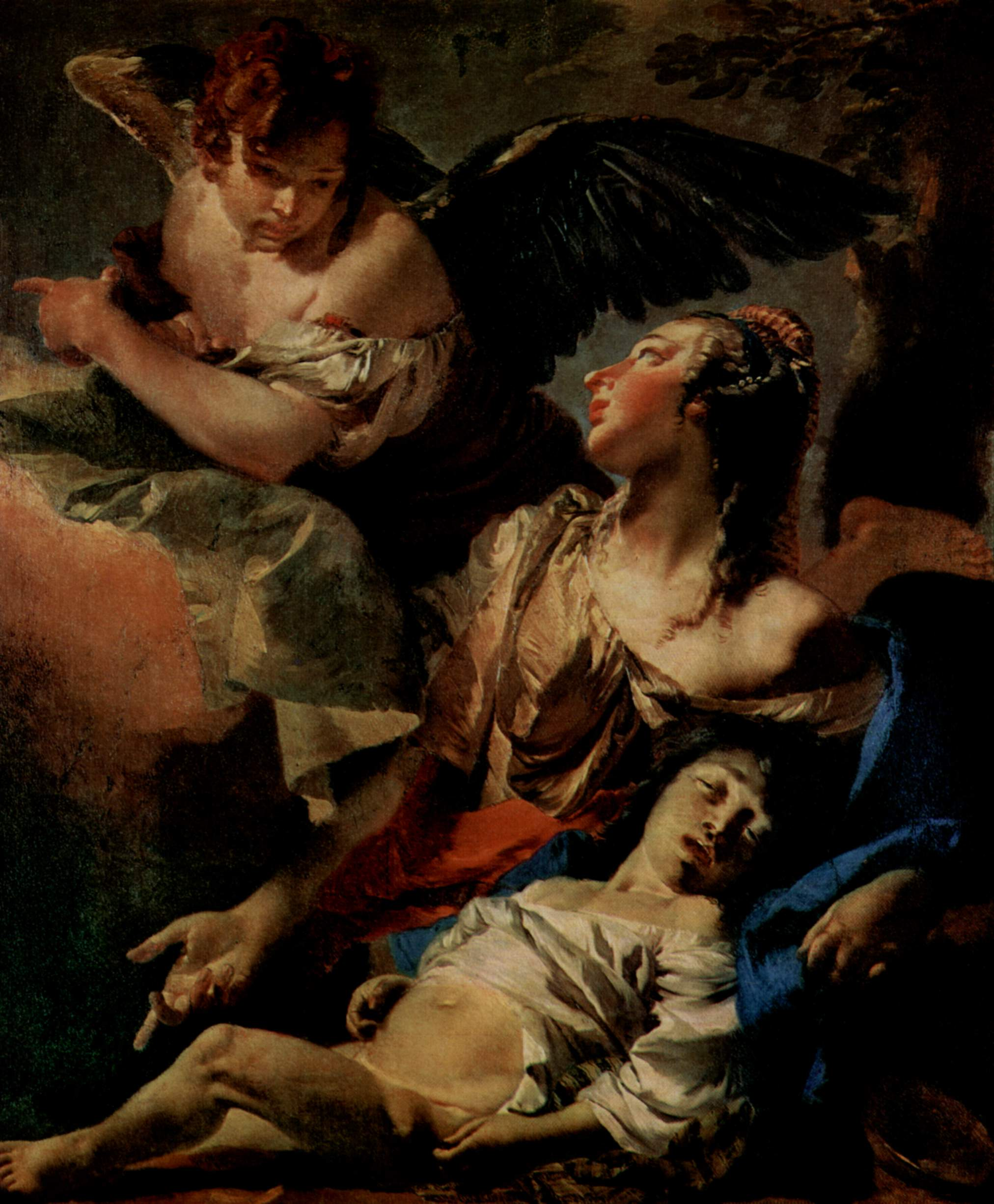
Hagar and Ishmael (painting c. 1732 by Giovanni Battista Tiepolo)

=== Fifth reading – Genesis 21:5–21 ===
In the fifth reading, Abraham was 100 years old when Isaac was born, and Sarah remarked that God had brought her laughter and that everyone would laugh with her about her bearing Abraham a child in his old age. Abraham held a great feast on the day that Sarah weaned Isaac. Sarah saw Hagar's son Ishmael playing, and Sarah told Abraham to cast Hagar and Ishmael out, saying that Ishmael would not share in Abraham's inheritance with Isaac. Sarah's words greatly distressed Abraham, but God told Abraham not to be distressed but to do whatever Sarah told him, for Isaac would carry on Abraham's line, and God would make a nation of Ishmael, too. Early the next morning, Abraham placed some bread and water on Hagar's shoulder, together with Ishmael, and sent them away. Hagar and Ishmael wandered in the wilderness of Beersheba, and when the water ran out, she left the child under a bush, sat down about two bowshots away so as not to see the child die, and burst into tears. God heard the cry of the boy, and an angel called to Hagar, saying not to fear, for God had heeded the boy's cry, and would make of him a great nation. Then God opened her eyes to a well of water, and she and the boy drank. God was with Ishmael and he grew up in the wilderness and became a bowman. Ishmael lived in the wilderness of Paran, and Hagar got him an Egyptian wife. The fifth reading and the first open portion end here.

=== Sixth reading – Genesis 21:22–34 ===
In the sixth reading, Abimelech and Phicol the chief of his troops asked Abraham to swear not to deal falsely with them. Abraham reproached Abimelech because Abimelech's servants had seized Abraham's well, but Abimelech protested ignorance. Abraham gave Abimelech sheep and oxen and the two men made a pact. Abraham then offered Abimelech seven ewes as proof that Abraham had dug the well. They called the place Beersheba, for the two of them swore an oath there. After they concluded their pact, Abimelech and Phicol returned to Philistia, and Abraham planted a tamarisk and invoked God's name. Abraham lived in Philistia a long time. The sixth reading and the second open portion end here with the end of chapter 21.

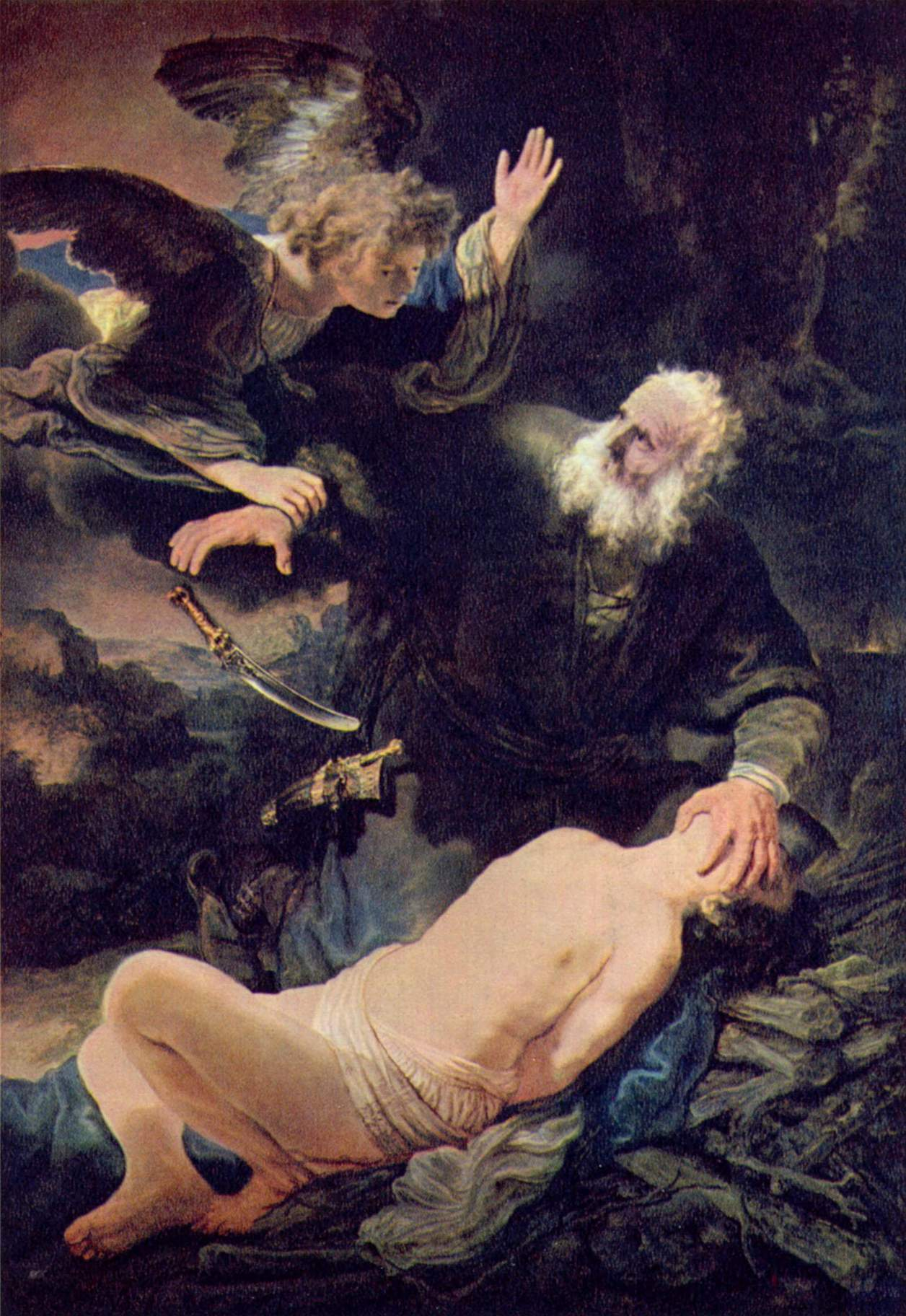
The Angel Hinders the Offering of Isaac (1635 painting by Rembrandt)

=== Seventh reading – Genesis chapter 22 ===
In the seventh reading, which coincides with chapter 22, sometime later, God tested Abraham, directing him to take Isaac to the land of Moriah and offer him there as a burnt offering. Early the next morning, Abraham saddled his donkey and split wood for the burnt offering, and then he, two of his servants, and Isaac set out for the place that God had named. On the third day, Abraham saw the place from afar, and directed his servants to wait with the donkey, while Isaac and he went up to worship and then return. Abraham took the firestone and the knife, put the wood on Isaac, and the two walked off together. When Isaac asked Abraham where the sheep was for the burnt offering, Abraham replied that God would see to the sheep for the burnt offering. They arrived at the place that God had named, and Abraham built an altar, laid out the wood, bound Isaac, laid him on the altar, and picked up the knife to slay him. Then an angel called to Abraham, telling him not to raise his hand against the boy, for now God knew that Abraham feared God, since he had not withheld his son. Abraham looked up and saw a ram caught in a thicket by its horns, so he offered it as a burnt offering in place of his son. Abraham named the site Adonai-yireh. The angel called to Abraham a second time, saying that because Abraham had not withheld his son, God would bless him and make his descendants as numerous as the stars of heaven and the sands on the seashore, and victorious over their foes. All the nations of the earth would bless themselves by Abraham's descendants, because he obeyed God's command. Abraham returned to his servants, and they departed for Beersheba, where Abraham stayed. The third open portion ends here.

As the seventh reading continues with the maftir reading that concludes the parashah, later, Abraham learned that Milcah had borne eight children to his brother Nahor, among whom was Bethuel, who became the father of Rebekah. Nahor's concubine Reumah also bore him four children. The seventh reading, the fourth open portion, chapter 22, and the parashah end here.

=== Readings according to the triennial cycle ===
Jews who read the Torah according to the triennial cycle of Torah reading read the parashah according to the following schedule:

	Year 1	Year 2	Year 3
	2025, 2028, 2031 . . .	2026, 2029, 2032 . . .	2027, 2030, 2033 . . .
Reading	18:1–33	19:1–20:18	21:1–22:24
1	18:1–5	19:1–11	21:1–4
2	18:6–8	19:12–20	21:5–13
3	18:9–14	19:21–29	21:14–21
4	18:15–21	19:30–38	21:22–34
5	18:22–26	20:1–8	22:1–8
6	18:27–30	20:9–14	22:9–19
7	18:31–33	20:15–18	22:20–24
Maftir	18:31–33	20:15–18	22:20–24

== In inner-Biblical interpretation ==
The parashah has parallels or is discussed in these Biblical sources:

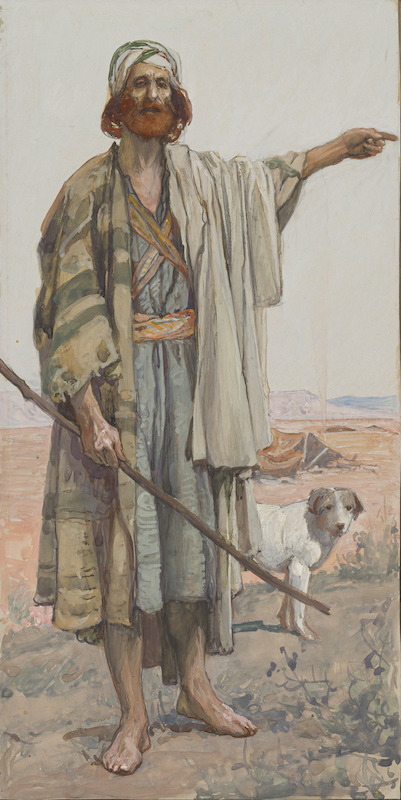
Amos (gouache on board, c. 1896–1902 by James Tissot)

=== Genesis chapter 18 ===
In Genesis 6:13, God shared God's purpose with Noah, saying, "I have decided to put an end to all flesh" with the flood, and in an internal dialogue in Genesis 18:17–19, God asked, "Shall I hide from Abraham what I am about to do . . . ?" In Amos 3:7, the prophet Amos reported, "Indeed, my Lord God does nothing without having revealed His purpose to His servants the prophets."

Ezekiel 16:49–50 explains what the "grievous" sin was that Genesis 18:20 reported in Sodom. Ezekiel 16:49–50 says that Sodom's iniquity was pride. Sodom had plenty of bread and careless ease, but Sodom did not help the poor and the needy. The people of Sodom were haughty and committed abomination, so God removed them.

Jeremiah 23:14 condemns the prophets of Jerusalem for becoming like the inhabitants of Sodom and Gomorrah in that they committed a horrible thing, they committed adultery, they walked in lies, they strengthened the hands of evil-doers, and they did not return from their wickedness.

Lamentations 4:6 judged the iniquity of Jerusalem that lead to the Babylonian captivity as greater than the sin of Sodom that led to its destruction in an instant.

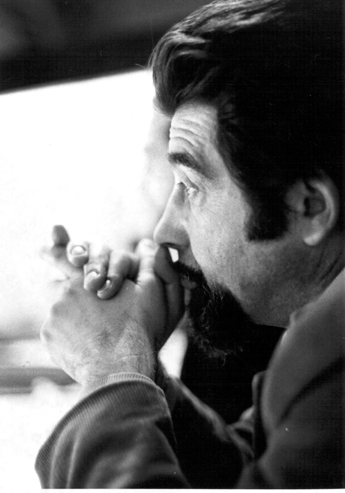
Schwarzschild

In Genesis 18:25, Abraham asked, "Shall not the Judge of all the earth do justly?" God's role as Judge and God's justice are recurring themes in the Hebrew Bible (Tanakh). In Psalm 9:5, the Psalmist tells God, "You have maintained my right and my cause; You sat upon the throne as the righteous Judge." Psalm 58:12 (58:11 in the KJV) affirms that "there is a God that judges in the earth." And Psalm 94:2 similarly calls God "Judge of the earth." Deuteronomy 10:18 reports that God "executes justice for the fatherless and widow." Psalm 33:5 reports that God "loves righteousness and justice." In Psalm 89:14, the Psalmist tells God, "Righteousness and justice are the foundation of Your throne." Psalm 103:6 says that God "executes righteousness and acts of justice for all who are oppressed"; Psalm 140:13 (140:12 in the KJV) says that God "will maintain the cause of the poor, and the right of the needy"; and Psalm 146:7 says that God "executes justice for the oppressed." And Isaiah 28:17, quotes God saying, "I will make justice the line, and righteousness the plummet." Steven Schwarzschild concluded in the Encyclopaedia Judaica that "God's primary attribute of action . . . is justice" and "Justice has widely been said to be the moral value which singularly characterizes Judaism."

=== Genesis chapter 19 ===
Judges 19:11-30 tells a story parallel in many regards to that of Lot and the men of Sodom in Genesis 19:1–11.

=== Genesis chapter 22 ===
Nehemiah 9:8 interpreted God's test of Abraham in Genesis 22 as a test of Abraham's faith, saying to God, "You found his heart faithful before You."

2 Chronicles 3:1 reports that Solomon built the Temple on Mount Moriah, the place to which God sent Abraham in Genesis 22:1–2.

God's blessing to Abraham in Genesis 22:18 that "All the nations of the earth shall bless themselves by your descendants" parallels God's blessing to Abraham in Genesis 12:3 that "all the families of the earth shall bless themselves by you," and is paralleled by God's blessing to Jacob in Genesis 28:14 that "All the families of the earth shall bless themselves by you and your descendants," and is fulfilled by Balaam's request in Numbers 23:10 to share Israel's fate.

In Genesis 22:17, God promised that Abraham's descendants would as numerous as the stars of heaven and the sands on the seashore. Similarly, in Genesis 15:5, God promised that Abraham's descendants would be as numerous as the stars of heaven. In Genesis 26:4, God reminded Isaac that God had promised Abraham that God would make his heirs as numerous as the stars. In Genesis 32:13, Jacob reminded God that God had promised that Jacob's descendants would be as numerous as the sands. In Exodus 32:13, Moses reminded God that God had promised to make the Patriarchs’ descendants as numerous as the stars. In Deuteronomy 1:10, Moses reported that God had multiplied the Israelites until they were then as numerous as the stars. In Deuteronomy 10:22, Moses reported that God had made the Israelites as numerous as the stars. And Deuteronomy 28:62 foretold that the Israelites would be reduced in number after having been as numerous as the stars.

== In early nonrabbinic interpretation ==
The parashah has parallels or is discussed in these early nonrabbinic sources:

=== Genesis chapters 12–23 ===
The second century BCE Book of Jubilees reported that Abraham endured ten trials and was found faithful and patient in spirit. Jubilees listed eight of the trials: (1) leaving his country, (2) the famine, (3) the wealth of kings, (4) his wife taken from him, (5) circumcision, (6) Hagar and Ishmael driven away, (7) the binding of Isaac, and (8) buying the land to bury Sarah.

=== Genesis chapter 19 ===
Josephus taught that Lot entreated the angels to accept lodging with him because he had learned to be a generous and hospitable man by imitating Abraham.

The Wisdom of Solomon held that Wisdom delivered the "righteous" Lot, who fled from the wicked who perished when the fire came down on the five cities.

== In classical rabbinic interpretation ==
The parashah is discussed in these rabbinic sources from the era of the Mishnah and the Talmud:

=== Genesis chapter 18 ===
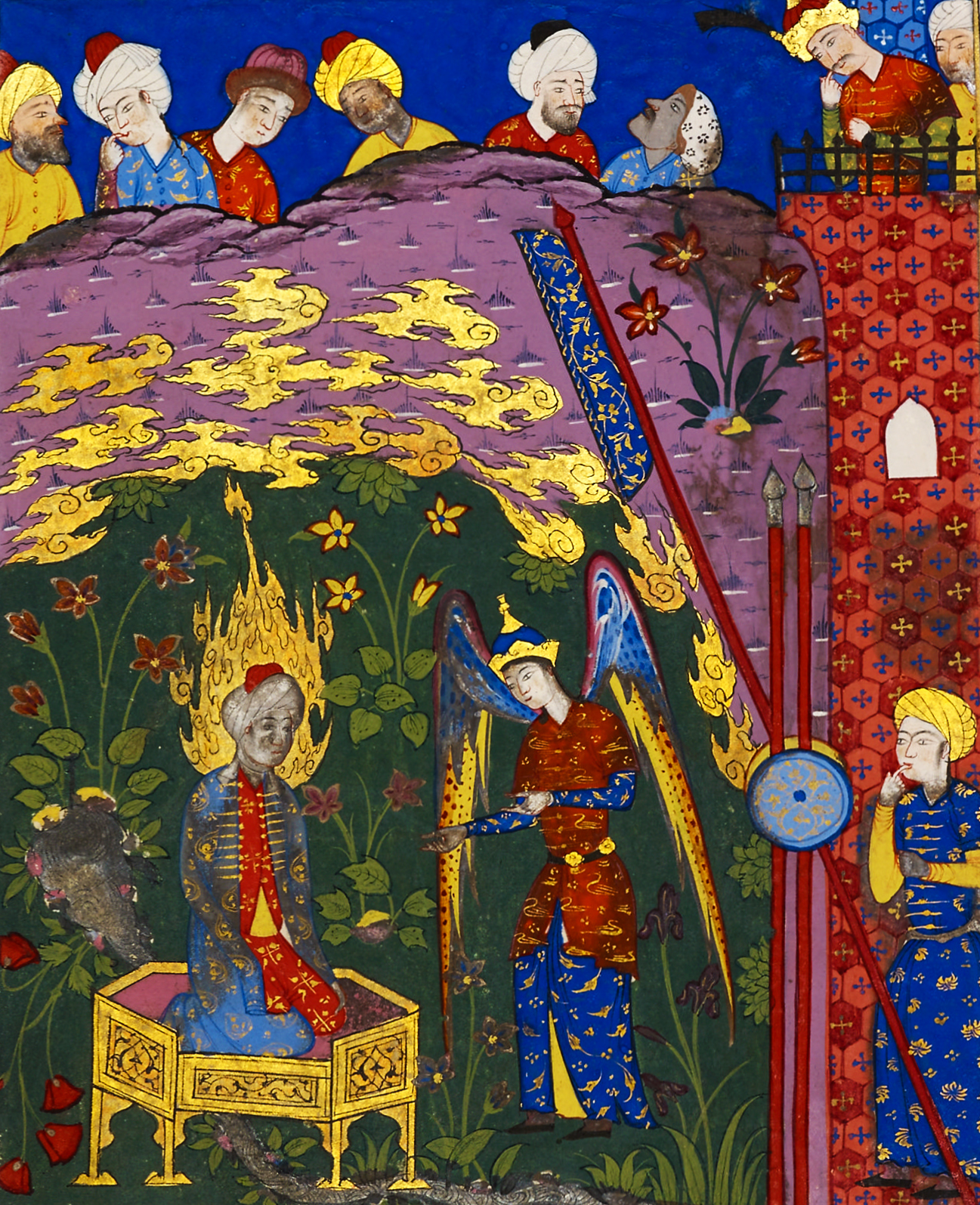
Islamic Persian miniature of Jibril protecting Ibrahim from Nimrod's fire.

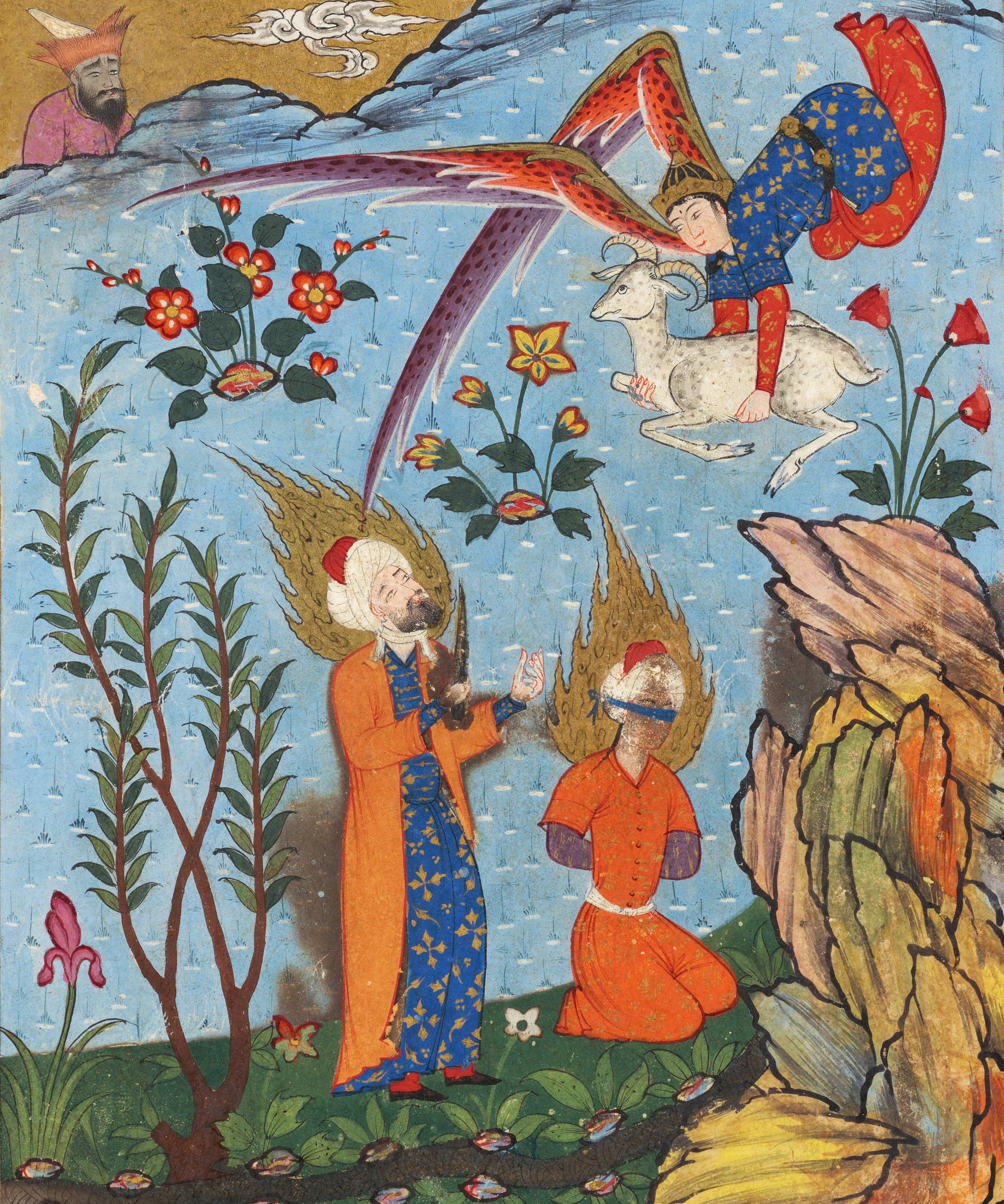
Sacrifice of Ibrahim's son stopped by intervening Jibril delivering a sheep.

The Mishnah taught that Abraham suffered ten trials and withstood them all, demonstrating how great was Abraham's love for God. The Avot of Rabbi Natan taught that two trials were at the time he was bidden to leave Haran, two were with his two sons, two were with his two wives, one was in the wars of the Kings, one was at the covenant between the pieces, one was in Ur of the Chaldees (where, according to a tradition, he was thrown into a furnace and came out unharmed), and one was the covenant of circumcision. Similarly, the Pirke De-Rabbi Eliezer counted as the 10 trials (1) when Abraham was a child and all the magnates of the kingdom and the magicians sought to kill him, (2) when he was put into prison for ten years and cast into the furnace of fire, (3) his migration from his father's house and from the land of his birth, (4) the famine, (5) when Sarah his wife was taken to be Pharaoh's wife, (6) when the kings came against him to slay him, (7) when (in the words of Genesis 17:1) "the word of the Lord came to Abram in a vision," (8) when Abram was 99 years old and God asked him to circumcise himself, (9) when Sarah asked Abraham (in the words of Genesis 21:10) to "Cast out this bondwoman and her son," and (10) the binding of Isaac. And the Mekhilta of Rabbi Ishmael taught that Abraham inherited both this world and the World To Come as a reward for his faith, as Genesis 15:6 says, "And he believed in the Lord."

Rabbi Hama son of Rabbi Ḥanina taught that visiting the infirm (as God did in Genesis 18:1) demonstrates one of God's attributes that humans should emulate. Rabbi Hama asked what Deuteronomy 13:5 means in the text, "You shall walk after the Lord your God." How can a human being walk after God, when Deuteronomy 4:24 says, "[T]he Lord your God is a devouring fire"? Rabbi Hama explained that the command to walk after God means to walk after the attributes of God. As God clothes the naked—for Genesis 3:21 says, "And the Lord God made for Adam and for his wife coats of skin and clothed them"—so should we also clothe the naked. God visited the sick—for Genesis 18:1 says, "And the Lord appeared to him by the oaks of Mamre" (after Abraham was circumcised in Genesis 17:26)—so should we also visit the sick. God comforted mourners—for Genesis 25:11 says, "And it came to pass after the death of Abraham, that God blessed Isaac his son"—so should we also comfort mourners. God buried the dead—for Deuteronomy 34:6 says, "And He buried him in the valley"—so should we also bury the dead. Similarly, the Sifre on Deuteronomy 11:22 taught that to walk in God's ways means to be (in the words of Exodus 34:6) "merciful and gracious."

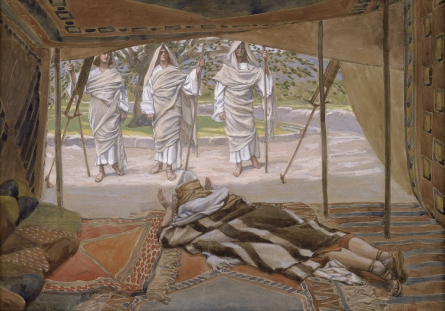
Abraham and the Three Angels (gouache on board c. 1896–1902 by James Tissot)

Reading the instructions for inaugurating the Tabernacle in Leviticus 9:4, "And [take] an ox and a ram for peace-offerings . . . for today the Lord will appear to you," Rabbi Levi taught that God reasoned that if God would thus reveal God's Self to and bless him who sacrificed an ox and a ram for God's sake, how much more should God reveal God's Self to Abraham, who circumcised himself for God's sake. Consequently, Genesis 18:1 reports, "And the Lord appeared to him [Abraham]."

Rabbi Leazar ben Menahem taught that the opening words of Genesis 18:1, "And the Lord appeared," indicated God's proximity to Abraham. Rabbi Leazar taught that the words of Proverbs 15:29, "The Lord is far from the wicked," refer to the prophets of other nations. But the continuation of Proverbs 15:29, "He hears the prayer of the righteous," refers to the prophets of Israel. God appears to nations other that Israel only as one who comes from a distance, as Isaiah 39:3 says, "They came from a far country to me." But in connection with the prophets of Israel, Genesis 18:1 says, "And the Lord appeared," and Leviticus 1:1 says, "And the Lord called," implying from the immediate vicinity. Rabbi Ḥaninah compared the difference between the prophets of Israel and the prophets of other nations to a king who was with his friend in a chamber separated by a curtain. Whenever the king desired to speak to his friend, he folded up the curtain and spoke to him. But God speaks to the prophets of other nations without folding back the curtain. The Rabbis compared it to a king who has a wife and a concubine; to his wife he goes openly, but to his concubine he repairs with stealth. Similarly, God appears to non-Jews only at night, as Numbers 22:20 says, "And God came to Balaam at night," and Genesis 31:24 says, "And God came to Laban the Aramean in a dream of the night."

The Pirke De-Rabbi Eliezer taught that God was revealed to all the prophets in a vision, but to Abraham God was revealed in a revelation and a vision. Genesis 18:1 tells of the revelation when it says, “And the Lord appeared to him by the oaks of Mamre.” And Genesis 15:1 tells of the vision when it says, “After these things the word of the Lord came to Abram in a vision.”

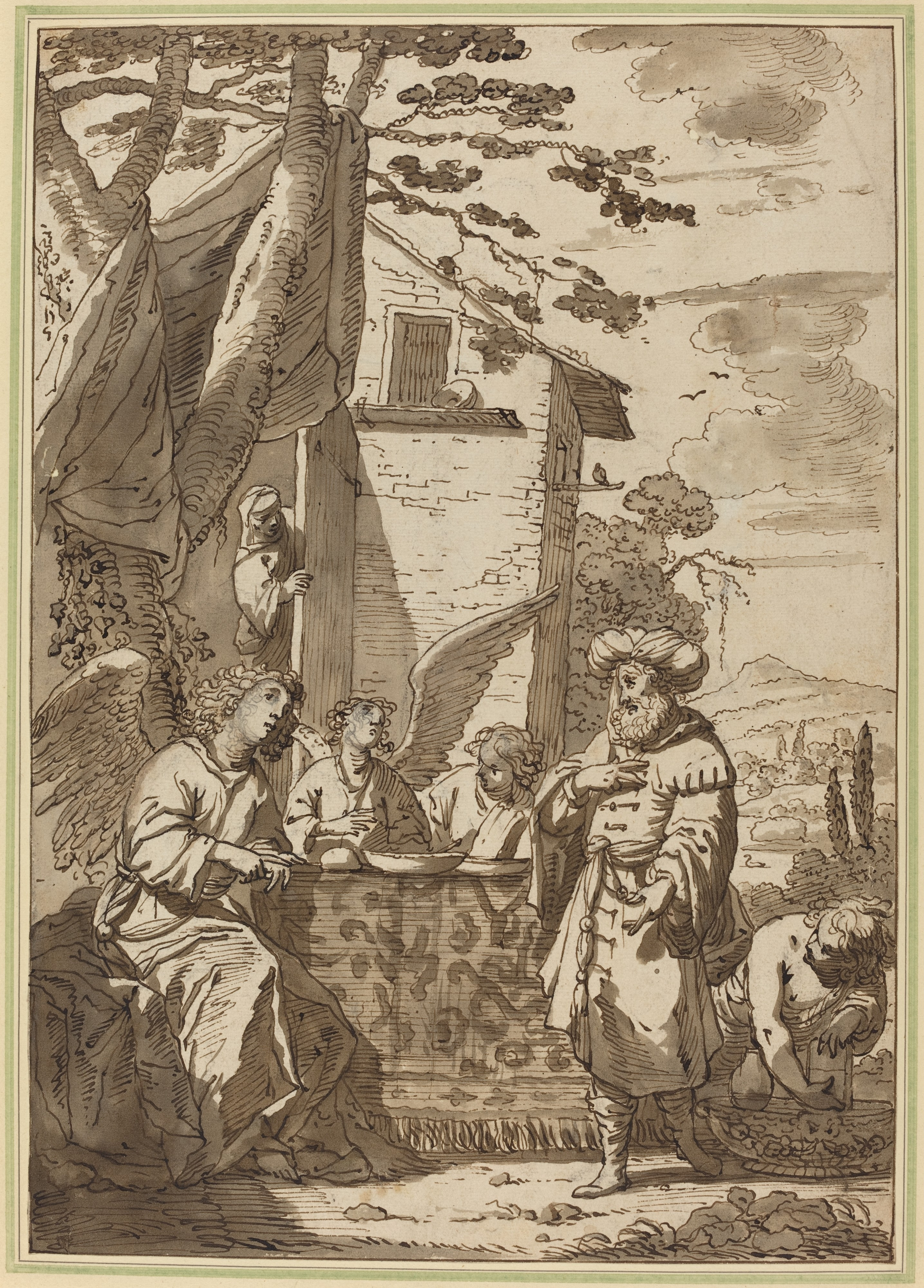
Abraham Entertaining the Angels (drawing c. 1610–1620 by Jan Tengnagel at the National Gallery of Art

A midrash interpreted the words of Job 19:26, "And when after my skin thus is destroyed (נִקְּפוּ, nikkefu), then through my flesh shall I see God," to allude to Abraham. According to the midrash, Abraham reasoned that after he circumcised himself, many proselytes flocked (hikkif) to attach themselves to the covenant, and it was thus because Abraham did so that God revealed God's Self to Abraham, as Genesis 18:1 reports, "And the Lord appeared to him." (And thus through circumcision performed on his flesh did Abraham come to see God.)

A midrash interpreted Song of Songs 2:9, "My beloved is like a gazelle or a young hart; behold, he stands behind our wall," to apply to God's Presence in the synagogue. The midrash read the words, "behold, He stands behind our wall," to allude to the occasion in Genesis 18:1 when God came to visit Abraham on the third day after Abraham's circumcision. Genesis 18:1 says, "And the Lord appeared to him by the terebinths of Mamre, as he sat (יֹשֵׁב, yoshev) . . . ." The word for "he sat" is in a form that can be read yashav, the letter vav being omitted, as though it read that Abraham was sitting before he saw God, but on seeing God, he wanted to stand up. But God told him to sit, as Abraham would serve as a symbol for his children, for when his children would come into their synagogues and houses of study and recite the Shema, they would be sitting down and God's Glory would stand by. To support this reading, the midrash cited Psalm 82:1, "God stands in the congregation of God."

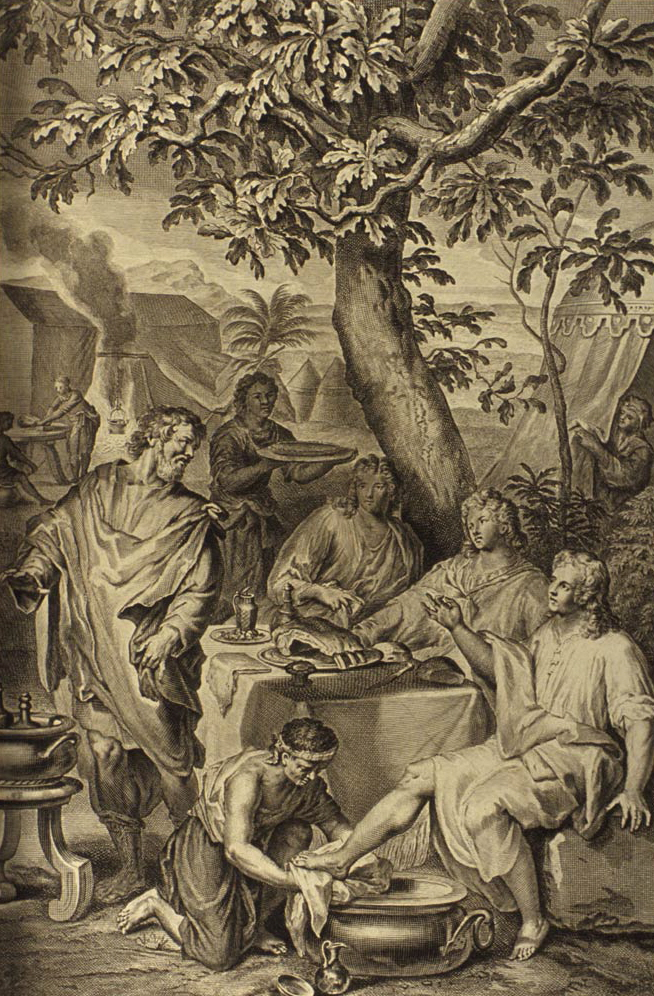
Abraham Stands by the Three Men under the Tree (illustration from the 1728 Figures de la Bible)

Rabbi Isaac taught that God reasoned that if God said in Exodus 20:21, "An altar of earth you shall make to Me [and then] I will come to you and bless you," thus revealing God's Self to bless him who built an altar in God's name, then how much more should God reveal God's Self to Abraham, who circumcised himself for God's sake. And thus, "the Lord appear to him."

A midrash interpreted the words of Psalm 43:36, "Your condescension has made me great," to allude to Abraham. For God made Abraham great by allowing Abraham to sit (on account of his age and weakness after his circumcision) while the Shekhinah stood, as Genesis 18:1 reports, "And the Lord appeared to him in the plains of Mamre, as he sat in the tent door."

A baraita taught that in Genesis 18:1, "in the heat of the day" meant the sixth hour, or exactly midday.

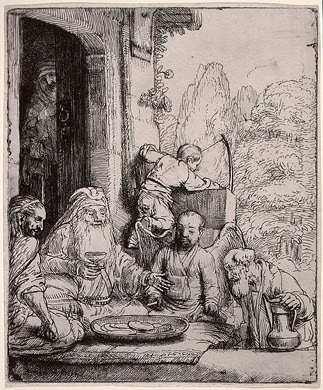
Abraham Entertaining the Angels (1656 etching by Rembrandt at the National Gallery of Art)

Rav Judah said in Rav's name that Genesis 18:1–3 showed that hospitality to wayfarers is greater than welcoming the Divine Presence. Rav Judah read the words "And he said, 'My Lord, if now I have found favor in Your sight, pass not away'" in Genesis 18:3 to reflect Abraham's request of God to wait for Abraham while Abraham saw to his guests. And Rabbi Eleazar said that God's acceptance of this request demonstrated how God's conduct is not like that of mortals, for among mortals, a lesser person cannot ask a greater person to wait, while in Genesis 18:3, God allowed it.

The Tosefta taught that God rewarded measure for measure Abraham's good deeds of hospitality in Genesis 18:2–16 with benefits for Abraham's descendants the Israelites.

The Gemara identified the "three men" in Genesis 18:2 as the angels Michael, Gabriel, and Raphael. Michael came to tell Sarah of Isaac's birth, Raphael came to heal Abraham, and Gabriel came to destroy Sodom. Noting that Genesis 19:1 reports that "the two angels came to Sodom," the Gemara explained that Michael accompanied Gabriel to rescue Lot. The Gemara cited the use of the singular "He" in Genesis 19:25, where it says, "He overthrew those cities," instead of "they overthrew" to demonstrate that a single angel (Gabriel) destroyed the cities.

Noting that in Genesis 18:5, Abraham offered, "And I will fetch a morsel of bread," but Genesis 18:7 reports, "And Abraham ran to the herd," doing much more than he offered, Rabbi Eleazar taught that the righteous promise little and perform much; whereas the wicked promise much and do not perform even little. The Gemara deduced the behavior of the wicked from Ephron, who in Genesis 23:15 said, "The land is worth 400 shekels of silver," but Genesis 23:16 reports, "And Abraham hearkened to Ephron; and Abraham weighed to Ephron the silver, which he had named in the audience of the sons of Heth, 400 shekels of silver, current money with the merchant," indicating that Ephron refused to accept anything but centenaria (which are more valuable than ordinary shekels).

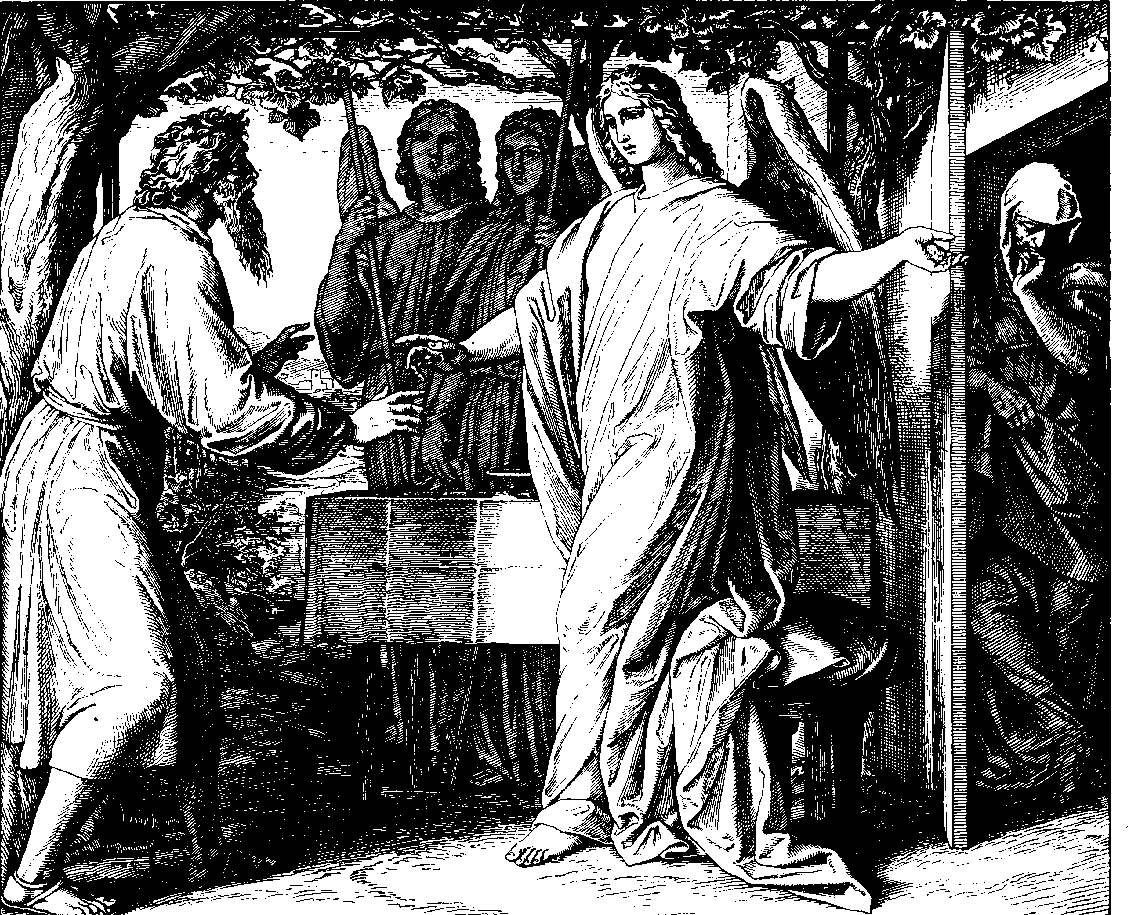
Three angels with Abraham, announcing the birth of Isaac (woodcut by Julius Schnorr von Carolsfeld from the 1860 Bible in Pictures)

The Gemara noted that in Genesis 18:6, Abraham directed Sarah to take flour, "knead it, and make cakes upon the hearth," but then Genesis 18:8 reports, "And he took butter and milk, and the calf," without reporting that Abraham brought any bread to his guests. Ephraim Maksha'ah, a disciple of Rabbi Meir, said in his teacher's name that Abraham ate even unconsecrated food (chullin) only when it was ritually pure, and that day Sarah had her menstrual period (and so the bread that she baked was ritually impure by virtue of this phenomenon that reflected the rejuvenation that was to make the birth of Isaac possible). Similarly, the Pirke de Rabbi Eliezer taught that when the three angels visited Abraham, Abraham ran to meet them and prepare for them a great banquet. He told Sarah to prepare cakes for them, but when Sarah was kneading, she perceived that the manner of women was upon her, so Abraham did not serve his visitors any of the cakes. Rather, Abraham ran to fetch a calf, but the calf fled from him and went into the cave of Machpelah. Abraham chased in after the calf and found Adam and Eve lying there upon their beds. Lights were kindled above them, and a sweet scent was upon them. Abraham consequently sought to get the cave as a burial possession, as Genesis 23 reports.

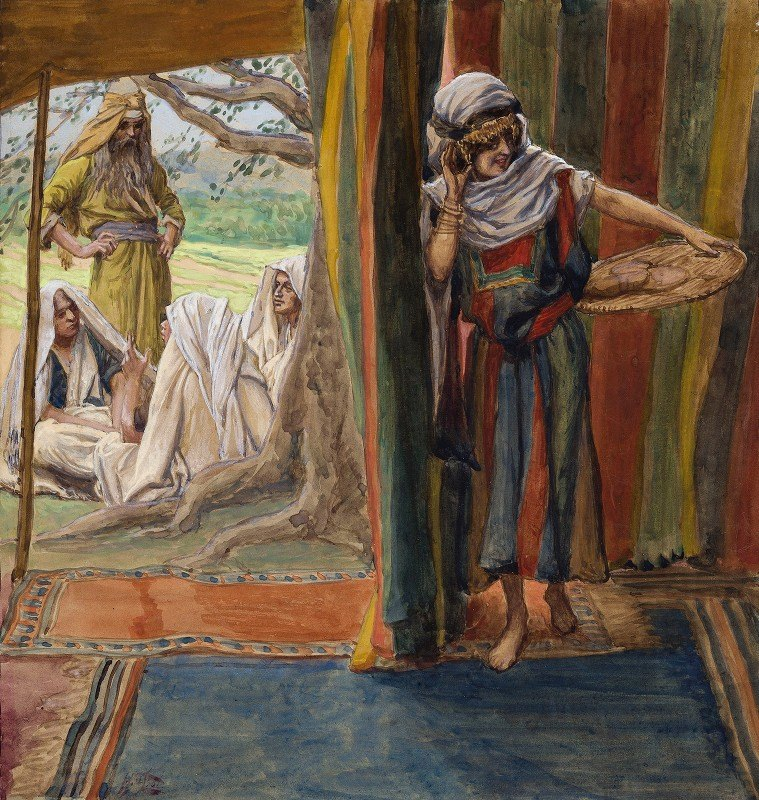
Sarah Hears and Laughs (gouache on board, c. 1896–1901 by James Tissot)

The Gemara read Genesis 18:9, "And they said to him, 'Where is Sarah your wife?' And he said, 'Behold, she is in the tent,'" to teach us that Sarah was modest (and therefore kept secluded). Rav Judah said in Rav's name that the ministering angels knew that Sarah was in the tent, but they brought out the fact that she was in the tent to make her more beloved to Abraham (by impressing him with her modesty). Rabbi Jose son of Rabbi Ḥanina said that they brought out the fact that she was in the tent to send her the wine-cup of benediction (the wine-cup over which the Grace after Meals is recited and which is shared by all the guests).

The Gemara reported that sages in the Land of Israel (and some said Rabbi Isaac) deduced from Sarah's practice as shown in Genesis 18:9 that while it was customary for a man to meet wayfarers, it was not customary for a woman to do so. The Gemara cited this deduction to support the ruling of Mishnah Yevamot 8:3 that while a male Ammonite or Moabite was forbidden from entering the congregation of Israel, an Ammonite or Moabite woman was permitted.

Rabbi Haggai said in Rabbi Isaac's name that all of the Matriarchs were prophets.

At the School of Rabbi Ishmael, it was taught that Genesis 18:12–13 demonstrated how great is the cause of peace, for Sarah said of Abraham in Genesis 18:12, "My lord [Abraham] being old," but when God reported Sarah's statement to Abraham, God reported Sarah to have said, "And I [Sarah] am old," so as to preserve peace between Abraham and Sarah. Similarly, in the Jerusalem Talmud, Rabbi Ḥanina said that Scripture teaches how awful the penumbra of gossip is, for Genesis 18:12–13 speaks evasively to keep the peace between Abraham and Sarah.

Reading "set time" in Genesis 18:14 to mean the next "holy day" (as in Leviticus 23:4) the Gemara deduced that God spoke to Abraham on Sukkot to promise that Isaac would be born on Passover, and that there must have been a leap year that year, as those deductions allow the maximum 7 months between any two holy days.

Ravina asked one of the Rabbis who expounded Aggadah before him for the origin of the Rabbinic saying, "The memory of the righteous shall be for a blessing." The Rabbi replied that Proverbs 10:7 says, "The memory of the righteous shall be for a blessing." Ravina asked from where in the Torah one might derive that teaching. The Rabbi answered that Genesis 18:17 says, "Shall I hide from Abraham that which I am doing?" And right after that mention of Abraham's name, God blessed Abraham in Genesis 18:18, saying, "Abraham shall surely become a great and mighty nation."

Rabbi Eleazar interpreted the words, "All the nations of the earth," in Genesis 18:18 to teach that even those who spend their time on the ships that go from Gaul to Spain (and thus spend very little time on the dry earth) are blessed only for Israel's sake.

The Gemara cited Genesis 18:19 to show that Abraham walked righteously and followed the commandments. Rabbi Simlai taught that God communicated to Moses a total of 613 commandments—365 negative commandments, corresponding to the number of days in the solar year, and 248 positive commandments, corresponding to the number of the parts in the human body. The Gemara taught that David reduced the number of precepts to eleven, as Psalm 15 says, "Lord, who shall sojourn in Your Tabernacle? Who shall dwell in Your holy mountain?—He who (1) walks uprightly, and (2) works righteousness, and (3) speaks truth in his heart; who (4) has no slander upon his tongue, (5) nor does evil to his fellow, (6) nor takes up a reproach against his neighbor, (7) in whose eyes a vile person is despised, but (8) he honors them who fear the Lord, (9) he swears to his own hurt and changes not, (10) he puts not out his money on interest, (11) nor takes a bribe against the innocent." Isaiah reduced them to six principles, as Isaiah 33:15–16 says, "He who (1) walks righteously, and (2) speaks uprightly, (3) he who despises the gain of oppressions, (4) who shakes his hand from holding of bribes, (5) who stops his ear from hearing of blood, (6) and shuts his eyes from looking upon evil; he shall dwell on high." The Gemara explained that "he who walks righteously" referred to Abraham, as Genesis 18:19 says, "For I have known him, to the end that he may command his children and his household after him." Micah reduced the commandments to three principles, as Micah 6:8 says, "It has been told you, o man, what is good, and what the Lord requires of you: only (1) to do justly, and (2) to love mercy, and (3) to walk humbly before your God." Isaiah reduced them to two principles, as Isaiah 56:1 says, "Thus says the Lord, (1) Keep justice and (2) do righteousness." Amos reduced them to one principle, as Amos 5:4 says, "For thus says the Lord to the house of Israel, 'Seek Me and live.'" To this Rav Nahman bar Isaac demurred, saying that this might be taken as: "Seek Me by observing the whole Torah and live." The Gemara concluded that Habakkuk based all the Torah's commandments on one principle, as Habakkuk 2:4 says, "But the righteous shall live by his faith."

The Gemara taught that Genesis 18:19 sets forth one of the three most distinguishing virtues of the Jewish People. The Gemara taught that David told the Gibeonites that the Israelites are distinguished by three characteristics: They are merciful, bashful, and benevolent. They are merciful, for Deuteronomy 13:18 says that God would "show you (the Israelites) mercy, and have compassion upon you, and multiply you." They are bashful, for Exodus 20:17 says "that God's fear may be before you (the Israelites)." And they are benevolent, for Genesis 18:19 says of Abraham "that he may command his children and his household after him, that they may keep the way of the Lord, to do righteousness and justice." The Gemara taught that David told the Gibeonites that only one who cultivates these three characteristics is fit to join the Jewish People.

Rabbi Eleazar taught that from the blessing of the righteous one may infer a curse for the wicked. The Gemara explained that one may see the principle at play in the juxtaposition of Genesis 18:19 and 18:20. For Genesis 18:19 speaks of the blessing of the righteous Abraham, saying, "For I have known him, to the end that he may command." And soon thereafter Genesis 18:20 speaks of the curse of the wicked people of Sodom and Gomorrah, saying, "Truly the cry of Sodom and Gomorrah is great."

The Mishnah taught that some viewed the people of Sodom as embracing a philosophy of "what's mine is mine." The Mishnah taught that there are four types of people: (1) One who says: "What's mine is mine, and what's yours is yours"; this is a neutral type, some say this was the type of Sodom. (2) One who says: "What's mine is yours, and what's yours is mine"; this is an unlearned person. (3) One who says: "What's mine is yours, and what's yours is yours"; this is a pious person. And (4) one who says: "What's mine is mine, and what's yours is mine;" this is a wicked person.

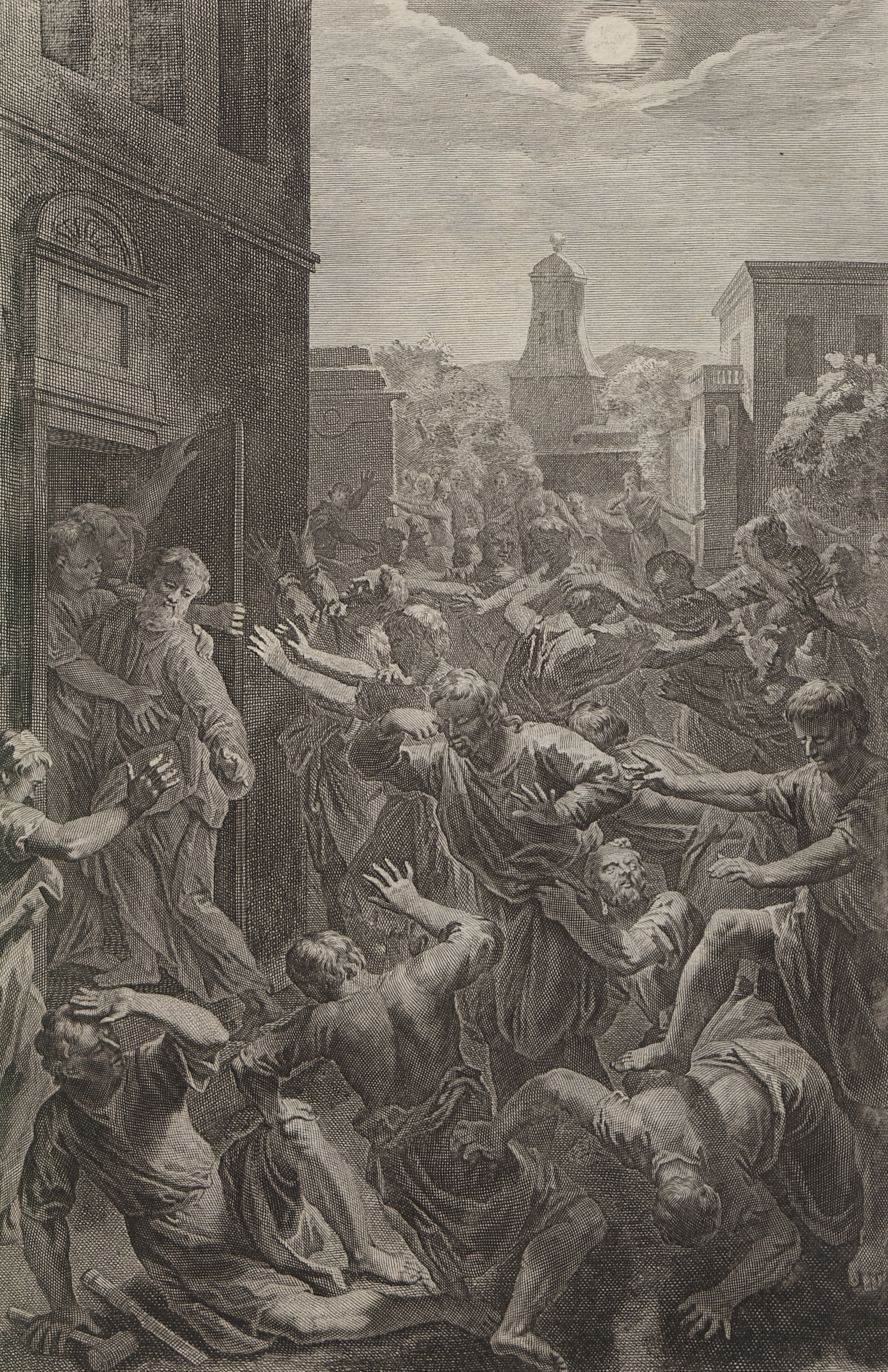
The Sodomites are smitten with blindness (illustration from the 1728 Figures de la Bible)

The Tosefta employed verses from the book of Job to teach that the people of Sodom acted arrogantly before God because of the good that God had lavished on them. As Job 28:5–8 says, "As for the land, out of it comes bread ... Its stones are the place of sapphires, and it has dust of gold. That path, no bird of prey knows ... The proud beasts have not trodden it." The people of Sodom reasoned that since bread, silver, gold, precious stones, and pearls came forth from their land, they did not need immigrants to come to Sodom. They reasoned that immigrants came only to take things away from Sodom and thus resolved to forget the traditional ways of hospitality. God told the people of Sodom that because of the goodness that God had lavished upon them, they had deliberately forgotten how things were customarily done in the world, and thus God would make them be forgotten from the world. As Job 28:4 says, "They open shafts in a valley from where men live. They are forgotten by travelers. They hang afar from men, they swing to and fro." As Job 12:5–6 says, "In the thought of one who is at ease, there is contempt for misfortune; it is ready for those whose feet slip. The tents of robbers are at peace, and those who provoke God are secure, who bring their god in their Hand." And so as Ezekiel 16:48–50 says, "As I live, says the Lord God, Sodom your sister has not done, she nor her daughters, as you and your daughters have done. Behold, this was the iniquity of your sister Sodom: pride, plenty of bread, and careless ease was in her and in her daughters; neither did she strengthen the hand of the poor and needy. And they were haughty, and committed abomination before Me; therefore I removed them when I saw it."

Rava interpreted the words of Psalm 62:4, "How long will you imagine mischief against a man? You shall be slain all of you; you are all as a bowing wall, and as a tottering fence." Rava interpreted this to teach that the people of Sodom would cast envious eyes on the wealthy, place them by a tottering wall, push the wall down on them, and take their wealth. Rava interpreted the words of Job 24:16, "In the dark they dig through houses, which they had marked for themselves in the daytime; they know not the light." Rava interpreted this to teach that they used to cast envious eyes on wealthy people and entrust fragrant balsam into their keeping, which they placed in their storerooms. In the evening the people of Sodom would smell it out like dogs, as Psalm 59:7 says, "They return at evening, they make a noise like a dog, and go round about the city." Then they would burrow in and steal the money.

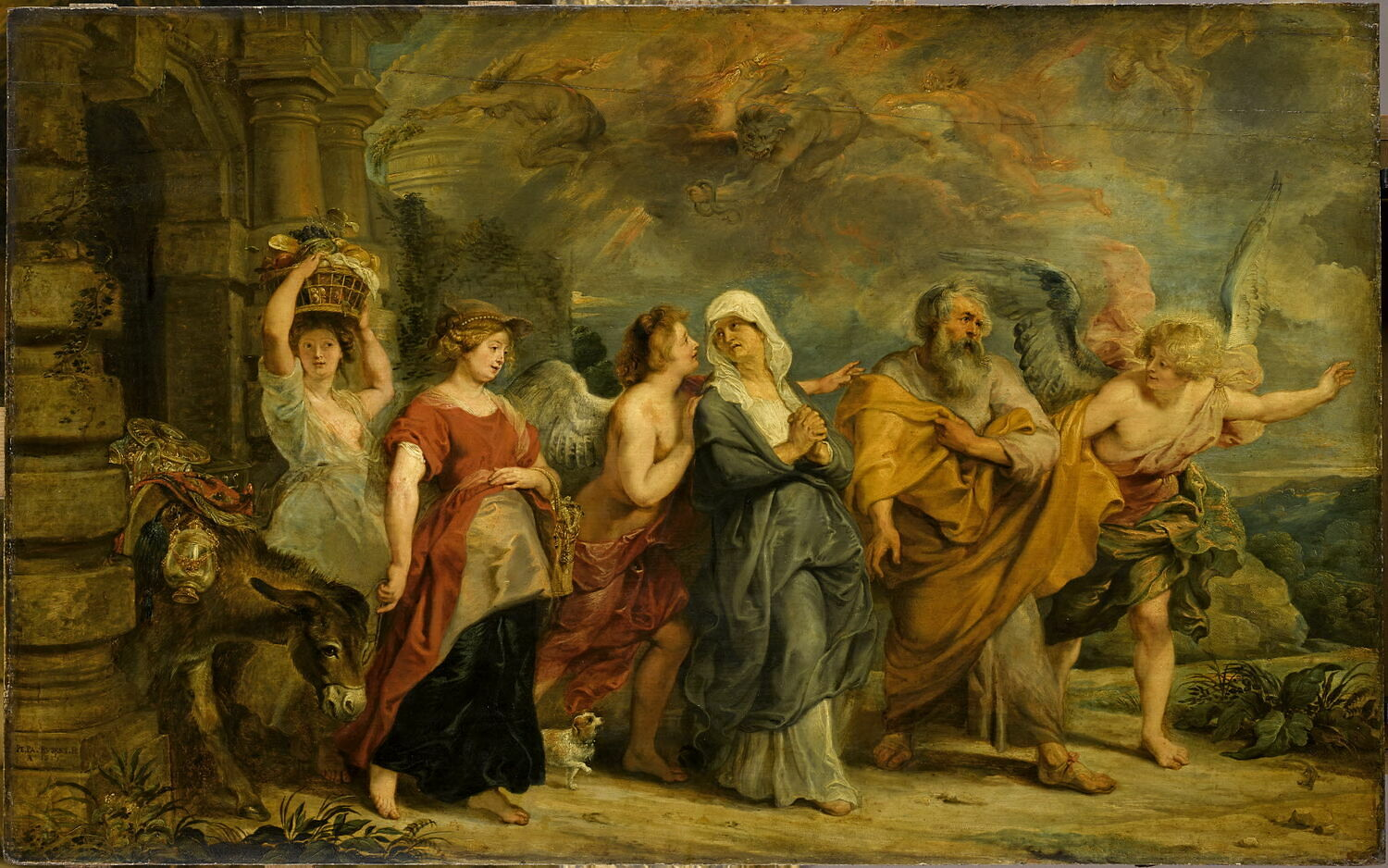
The Flight of Lot by Peter Paul Rubens, 1625

The Gemara told of the victims of the people of Sodom, in the words of Job 24:7, "They (would) lie all night naked without clothing and have no covering in the cold." The Gemara said of the people of Sodom, in the words of Job 24:3, "They drive away the donkey of the fatherless, they take the widow's ox for a pledge." In the words of Job 24:2, "They remove the landmarks; they violently take away flocks and feed them." And the Gemara told of their victims, in the words of Job 21:32, "he shall be brought to the grave, and shall remain in the tomb."

The Gemara told that there were four judges in Sodom, named Shakrai, Shakurai, Zayyafi, and Mazle Dina (meaning "Liar", "Awful Liar", "Forger", and "Perverter of Justice"). If a man assaulted his neighbor's wife and caused a miscarriage, the judges would tell the husband to give his wife to the neighbor so that the neighbor might make her pregnant. If a person cut off the ear of a neighbor's donkey, they would order the owner to give it to the offender until the ear grew again. If a person wounded a neighbor, they would tell the victim to pay the offender a fee for bleeding the victim. A person who crossed over with the ferry had to pay four zuzim, but the person who crossed through the water had to pay eight.

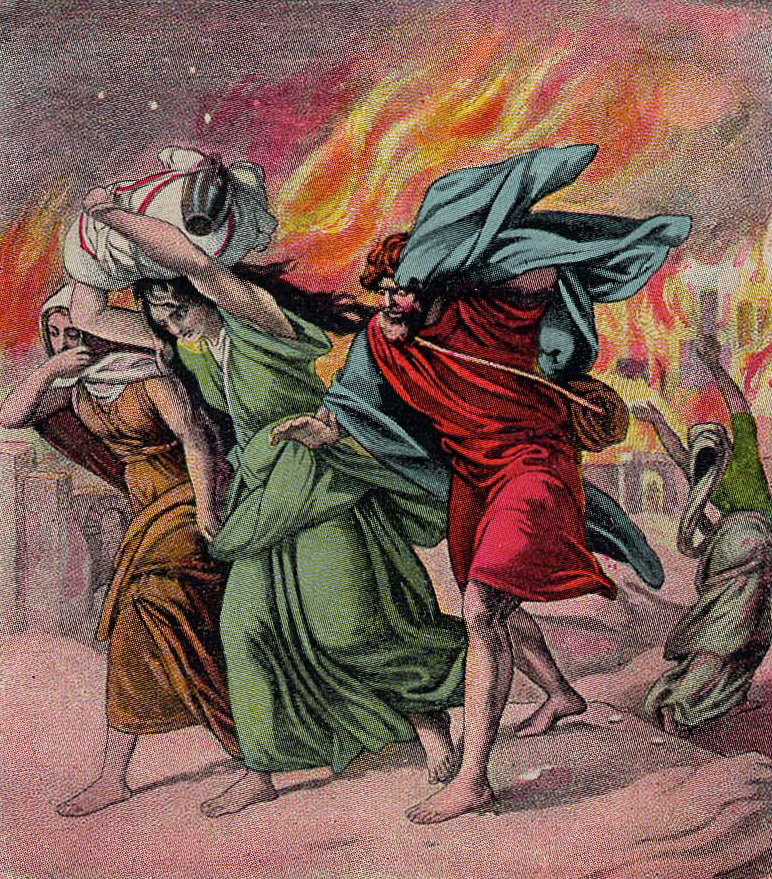
Lot and his Daughters Flee Sodom (1908 illustration by the Providence Lithograph Company)

Explaining the words, "the cry of Sodom and Gomorrah is great (rabbah, רָבָּה)," in Genesis 18:20, the Gemara told the story of a certain maiden (ribah) in Sodom who gave some bread to a poor man, hiding it in a pitcher. When the people of Sodom found out about her generosity, they punished her by smearing her with honey and placing her on the city wall, where the bees consumed her. Rav Judah thus taught in Rav's name that Genesis 18:20 indicates that God destroyed Sodom on account of the maiden (ribah).

Rabbi Judah explained the words of Genesis 18:21, "her cry that has come to Me." Noting that Genesis 18:21 does not say "their cry" but "her cry," Rabbi Judah told that the people of Sodom issued a proclamation that anyone who gave a loaf of bread to the poor or needy would be burned. Lot's daughter Pelotit, the wife of a magnate of Sodom, saw a poor man on the street, and was moved with compassion. Every day when she went out to draw water, she smuggled all kinds of provisions to him from her house in her pitcher. The men of Sodom questioned how the poor man could survive. When they found out, they brought Pelotit out to be burned. She cried out to God to maintain her cause, and her cry ascended before the Throne of Glory. And God said (in the words of Genesis 18:21) "I will go down now, and see whether they have done altogether according to her cry that has come to Me."

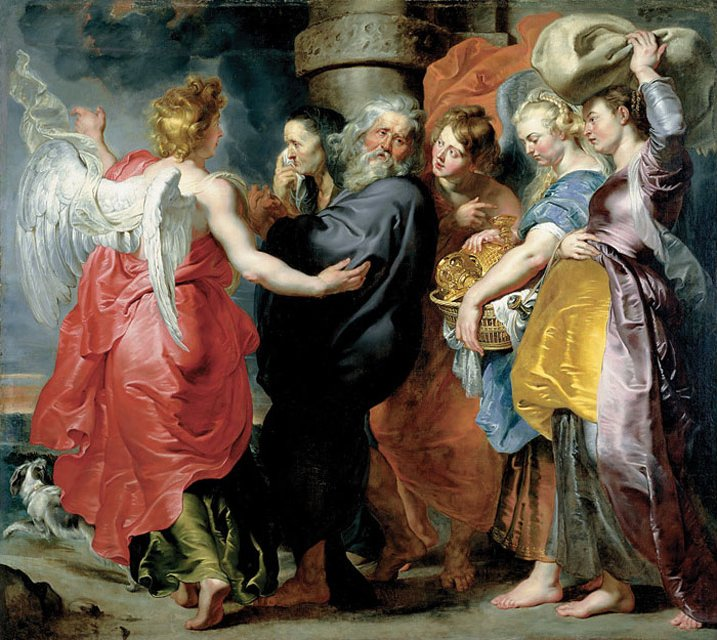
The Flight of Lot and His Family from Sodom by Peter Paul Rubens, c. 1613-15. Oil on canvas.

Reading Abraham's request in Genesis 18:32, "What if ten shall be found there?" a midrash asked, why ten (and not fewer)? The midrash answered, so that there might be enough for a minyan of righteous people to pray on behalf of all the people of Sodom. Alternatively, the midrash said, because at the generation of the Flood, eight righteous people remained (in Noah and his family) and God did not give the world respite for their sake. Alternatively, the midrash said, because Lot thought that there were ten righteous people in Sodom—namely Lot, his wife, his four daughters, and his four sons-in-law (but Lot was apparently mistaken in thinking them righteous). Rabbi Judah the son of Rabbi Simon and Rabbi Ḥanin in Rabbi Joḥanan's name said that ten were required for Sodom, but for Jerusalem even one would have sufficed, as Jeremiah 5:1 says, "Run to and fro in the streets of Jerusalem . . . and seek . . . if you can find a man, if there be any who does justly . . . and I will pardon her." And thus Ecclesiastes 7:27 says, "Adding one thing to another, to find out the account." Rabbi Isaac explained that an account can be extended as far as one man for one city. And thus if one righteous person can be found in a city, it can be saved in the merit of that righteous person.

Did Abraham's prayer to God in Genesis 18:23–32 change God's harsh decree? Could it have? On this subject, Rabbi Abbahu interpreted David's last words, as reported in 2 Samuel 23:2–3, where David reported that God told him, "Ruler over man shall be the righteous, even he who rules through the fear of God." Rabbi Abbahu read 2 Samuel 23:2–3 to teach that God rules humankind, but the righteous rule God, for God makes a decree, and the righteous may through their prayer annul it.

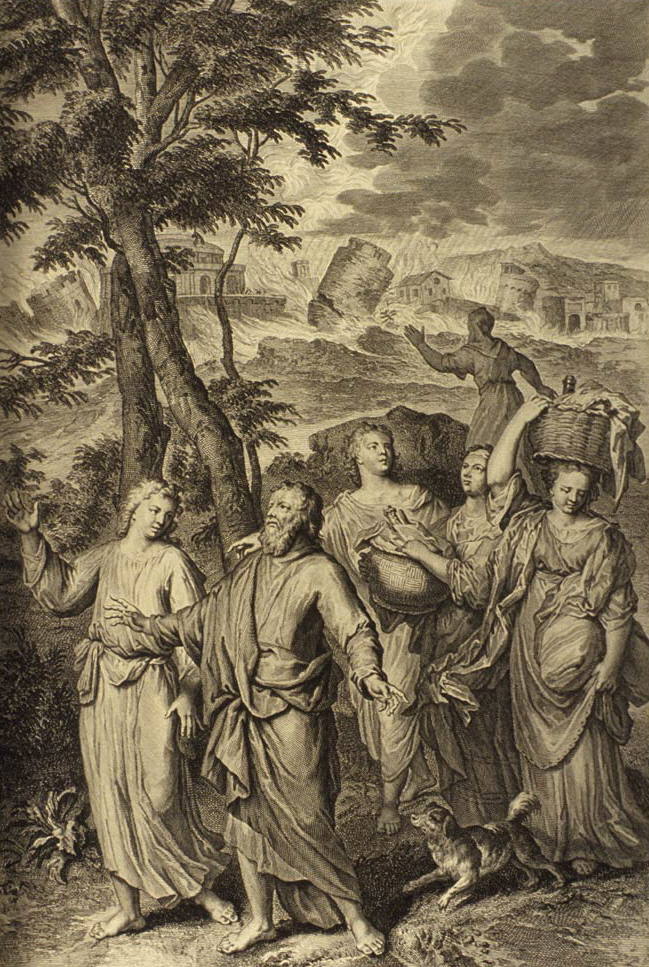
An Angel Leads Lot out of Sodom and Destroys the City (illustration from the 1728 Figures de la Bible)

=== Genesis chapter 19 ===
A midrash asked why the angels took so long to travel from Abraham's camp to Sodom, leaving Abraham at noon and arriving in Sodom only (as Genesis 19:1 reports) "in the evening." The midrash explained that they were angels of mercy, and thus they delayed, thinking that perhaps Abraham might find something to change Sodom's fate, but when Abraham found nothing, as Genesis 19:1 reports, "the two angels came to Sodom in the evening."

A midrash noted that in Genesis 19:1, the visitors are called "angels," whereas in Genesis 18:2, they were called "men." The midrash explained that earlier, when the Shechinah (the Divine Presence) was above them, Scripture called them men, but as soon as the Shechinah departed from them, they assumed the form of angels. Rabbi Levi (or others say Rabbi Tanḥuma in the name of Rabbi Levi) said that to Abraham, whose spiritual strength was great, they looked like men (as Abraham was as familiar with angels as with men). But to Lot, whose spiritual strength was weak, they appeared as angels. Rabbi Ḥanina taught that before they performed their mission, they were called "men." But having performed their mission, they are referred to as "angels." Rabbi Tanḥuma compared them to a person who received a governorship from the king. Before reaching the seat of authority, the person goes about like an ordinary citizen. Similarly, before they performed their mission, Scripture calls them "men," but having performed their mission, Scripture calls them "angels."

The Pirke De-Rabbi Eliezer taught that Lot walked with Abraham and learned Abraham's good deeds and ways. The Sages told that Abraham made for himself a house outside Haran, and received all who entered into or went out from Haran, and gave them food and drink. He encouraged them to acknowledge the God of Abraham as the only One in the universe. When Lot came to Sodom, he did likewise. When the people of Sodom proclaimed that all who help the poor or needy with a loaf of bread would be burnt by fire, Lot became afraid, and did not help the poor by day, but did so by night, as Genesis 19:1 reports, “And the two angels came to Sodom at evening; and Lot sat in the gate of Sodom.” Lot saw the two angels walking in the street of the city, and he thought that they were wayfarers in the land, and he ran to meet them. He invited them to lodge overnight in his house and eat and drink. But the men would not accept this for themselves, so he took them by the hand against their will, and brought them inside his house, as Genesis 19:3 reports, “And he urged them greatly.” All were treated with measure for measure, for just as Lot had taken the angels by the hand without their will and taken them into his house, so they took hold of his hand in Genesis 19:16 and took Lot and his family out of the city, as Genesis 19:16 reports, “But he lingered; and the men laid hold upon his hand.” The angels told Lot and his family not to look behind, for the Shechinah had descended to rain brimstone and fire upon Sodom and Gomorrah. But Lot's wife Edith was stirred with pity for her daughters, who were married in Sodom, and she looked back behind her to see if they were coming after her. And she saw behind the Shechinah, and she became a pillar of salt, as Genesis 19:26 reports, “And his wife looked back from behind him, and she became a pillar of salt.”

The Gemara asked what differed between the incident involving Abraham, where the angels acquiesced immediately to Abraham's request to remain with him, as in Genesis 18:5, they said, “So do, as you have said,” and the incident involving Lot, where the angels first displayed reluctance, as Genesis 19:3 reports, “And he urged them greatly,” only after which the two angels acquiesced. Rabbi Elazar taught that from here we learn that one may decline the request of a lesser person, but not that of a great person.

A midrash expounded on the conversation between Lot and the angels. Expanding on the words, "but before they lay down" in Genesis 19:4, the midrash told that the angels began questioning Lot, inquiring into the nature of the people of the city. Lot replied that in every town there are good people and bad people, but in Sodom the overwhelming majority were bad. Then (in the words of Genesis 19:4) "the men of the city, the men of Sodom, compassed the house round, both young and old," not one of them objecting. And then (in the words of Genesis 19:5) "they called to Lot, and said to him: 'Where are the men that came to you this night? Bring them out to us, that we may know them.'" Rabbi Joshua ben Levi said in the name of Rabbi Padiah that Lot prayed for mercy on the Sodomites' behalf the whole night, and the angels would have heeded him. But when the Sodomites demanded (in the words of Genesis 19:5) "Bring them out to us, that we may know them," that is, for sexual purposes, the angels asked Lot (in the words of Genesis 19:12) "Do you have here (פֹה, poh) any besides?" Which one could read as asking, "What else do you have in your mouth (פֶּה, peh) (to say in their favor)?" Then the angels told Lot that up until then, he had the right to plead in their defense, but thereafter, he had no right to plead for them.

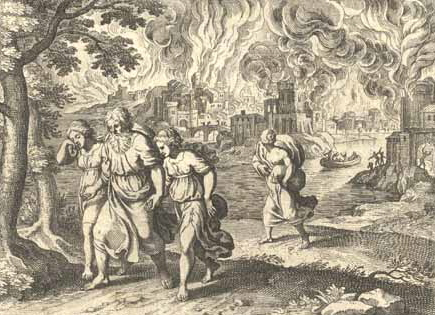
Escape of Lot from Sodom (engraving from the first half of the 17th Century by Matthäus Merian)

Yochanan bar Nafcha deduced from Genesis 19:15 and 19:23 that one can walk five miles (about 15,000 feet) in the time between the break of dawn and sunrise, as Genesis 19:15 reports that "when the morning arose, then the angels hastened Lot," and Genesis 19:23 reports that "The sun was risen upon the earth when Lot came to Zoar," and Rabbi Ḥaninah said that it was five miles from Sodom to Zoar. But the Gemara noted that as Genesis 19:15 reports that "the angels hastened Lot," they could naturally have covered more ground than a typical person.

The Gemara taught that all names that one could understand as the name of God that the Torah states in connection with Lot are non-sacred and refer to angels, except for that in Genesis 19:18–19, which is sacred. Genesis 19:18–19 says: “And Lot said to them: ‘Please, not so Adonai. Behold your servant has found favor in your eyes, and you have magnified Your mercy that You have performed for me by saving my life.’” The Gemara taught that one can deduce from the context that Lot addressed God, as Lot spoke to the One Who has the capacity to kill and to bring to life.

Reading what Lot told the angel in Genesis 19:20, “Behold, here is this city that is close to run away to and it is small,” the Gemara asked what the word “close” meant, for if it was close in distance, surely the angel could already have seen that. Rather, the word "close" must indicate that its settling was close—that it had been recently settled—and therefore that its sins were few. Thus, Rava bar Meḥasseya said that Rav Ḥama bar Gurya said Rav said that a person should always live in a recently settled city, as its residents will not yet have had the opportunity to commit many sins there. Rabbi Avin taught that the words, "I will escape there please (נָא, na)," in Genesis 19:20 teach that Zoar was newer than other cities. The numerological value of nun alef, the letters of the word נָא, na, is 51, while Sodom was 52 years old. And Rabbi Avin taught that Sodom's tranquil period during which it committed its sins was 26 years, as Genesis 14:4–5 reports: "Twelve years they served Chedorlaomer and thirteen years they rebelled, and in the fourteenth year Chedorlaomer came." The 12 plus 14 years during which they were enslaved were not years of tranquility, leaving only 26 tranquil years during which they were sinful.

Rabbi Eliezer taught that Lot lived in Sodom only on account of his property, but Rabbi Eliezer deduced from Genesis 19:22 that Lot left Sodom empty-handed with the angels telling him, "It is enough that you escape with your life." Rabbi Eliezer argued that Lot's experience proved the maxim (of Mishnah Sanhedrin 10:5) that the property of the wicked, whether inside or outside the town, will be lost.

Rabbi Meir taught that while Genesis 9:11 made clear that God would never again flood the world with water, Genesis 19:24 demonstrated that God might bring a flood of fire and brimstone, as God brought upon Sodom and Gomorrah.

The Mekhilta of Rabbi Ishmael called the east wind "the mightiest of winds" and taught that God used the east wind to punish the people of Sodom, as well as the generation of the Flood, the people of the Tower of Babel, the Egyptians with the plague of the locusts in Exodus 10:13, the Tribes of Judah and Benjamin, the Ten Tribes, Tyre, a wanton empire, and the wicked of Gehinnom.

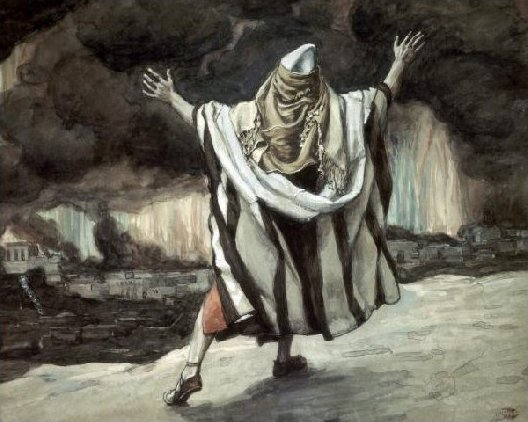
Abraham Sees Sodom in Flames (gouache on board, c. 1896–1902 by James Tissot)

Rabbi Joshua ben Levi (according to the Jerusalem Talmud) or a baraita in accordance with the opinion of Rabbi Jose the son of Rabbi Ḥanina (according to the Babylonian Talmud) said that the three daily prayers derived from the Patriarchs, and cited Genesis 19:27 for the proposition that Jews derived the morning prayer from Abraham, arguing that within the meaning of Genesis 19:27, "stood" meant "pray," just as it did in Psalm 106:30

Reading the words of Genesis 19:29, "God remembered Abraham and sent out Lot," a midrash asked what recollection was brought up in Lot's favor? The midrash answered that it was the silence that Lot maintained for Abraham when Abraham passed off Sarah as his sister.

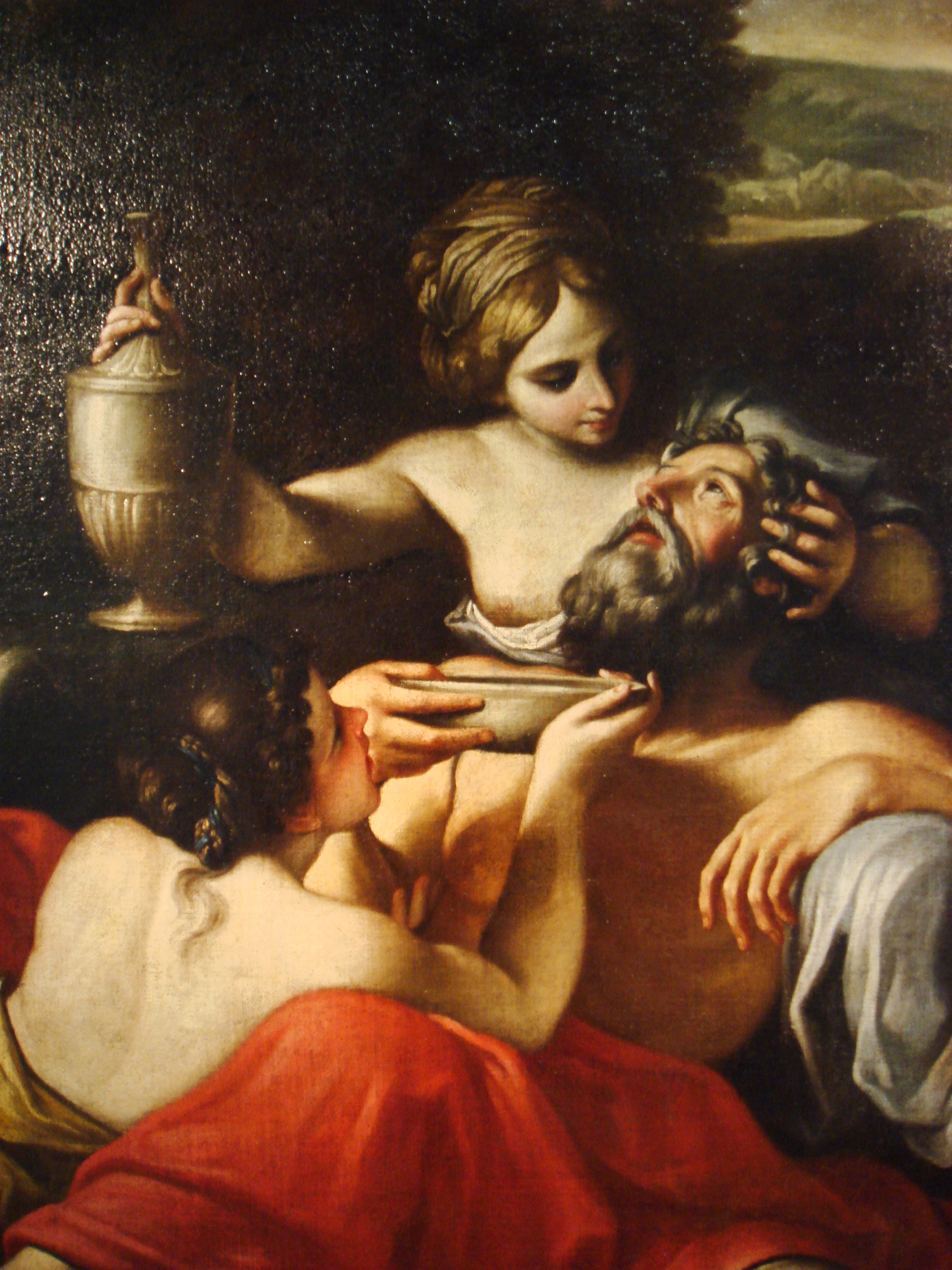
Lot and His Daughters (painting c. 1700 by Marcantonio Franceschini)

Interpreting Genesis 19:29, a midrash taught that (as Mishnah Shabbat rules, if one's house is burning on the Sabbath) one is permitted to save the case of the Torah along with the Torah itself, and one is permitted to save the Tefillin bag along with the Tefillin. This teaches that the righteous are fortunate, and so are those who cleave to them. Similarly, Genesis 8:1 says, "God remembered Noah, and all beasts, and all the animals that were with him in the Ark." And so too, in Genesis 19:29, "God remembered Abraham and sent out Lot."

Rabbi Hiyya bar Abba, citing Rabbi Joḥanan, taught that God rewards even polite speech. In Genesis 19:37, Lot's older daughter named her son Moab ("of my father"), and so in Deuteronomy 2:9, God told Moses, "Be not at enmity with Moab, neither contend with them in battle"; God forbade only war with the Moabites, but the Israelites might harass them. In Genesis 19:38, in contrast, Lot's younger daughter named her son Ben-Ammi (the less shameful "son of my people"), and so in Deuteronomy 2:19, God told Moses, "Harass them not, nor contend with them"; the Israelites were not to harass the Ammonites at all.

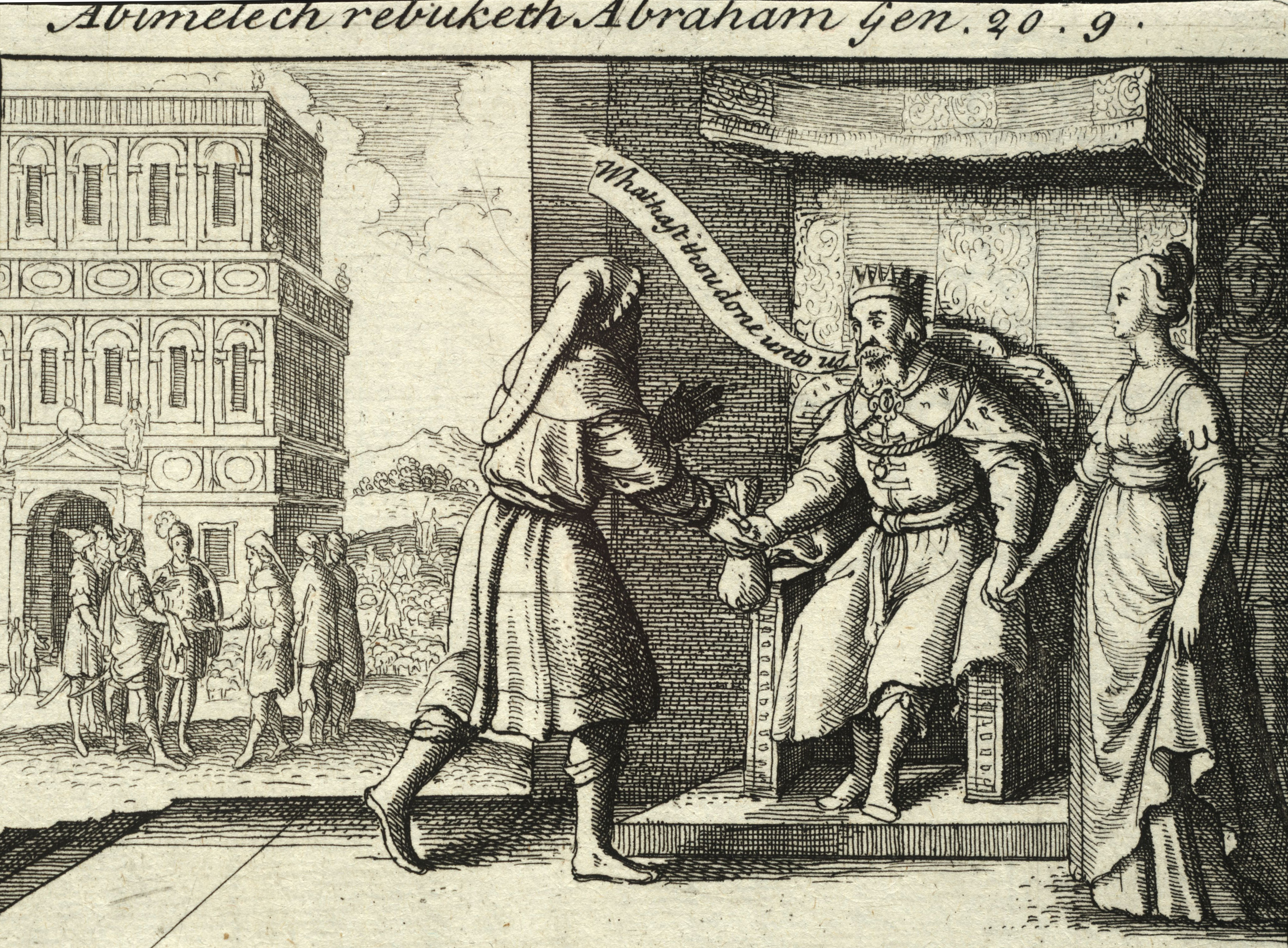
Abimelech Rebukes Abraham (17th Century illustration by Wenceslas Hollar)

=== Genesis chapter 20 ===
The Rabbis taught that God appears to non-Jews only in dreams, as God appeared to Abimelech "in a dream of the night" in Genesis 20:3, God appeared to Laban the "in a dream of the night" in Genesis 31:24, and God appeared to Balaam "at night" in Numbers 22:20. The Rabbis taught that God thus appeared more openly to the prophets of Israel than to those of other nations. The Rabbis compared God's action to those of a king who has both a wife and a concubine; to his wife he goes openly, but to his concubine he goes stealthily. And a midrash taught that God's appearance to Abimelech in Genesis 20:3 and God's appearance to Laban in Genesis 31:24 were the two instances where the Pure and Holy One allowed God's self to be associated with impure (idolatrous) people, on behalf of righteous ones.

The Gemara taught that a dream is a sixtieth part of prophecy. Rabbi Hanan taught that even if the Master of Dreams (an angel, in a dream that truly foretells the future) tells a person that on the next day the person will die, the person should not desist from prayer, for as Ecclesiastes 5:6 says, "For in the multitude of dreams are vanities and also many words, but fear God." (Although a dream may seem reliably to predict the future, it will not necessarily come true; one must place one's trust in God.) Rabbi Samuel bar Nahmani said in the name of Rabbi Jonathan that a person is shown in a dream only what is suggested by the person's own thoughts (while awake), as Daniel 2:29 says, "As for you, Oh King, your thoughts came into your mind upon your bed," and Daniel 2:30 says, "That you may know the thoughts of the heart." When Samuel had a bad dream, he used to quote Zechariah 10:2, "The dreams speak falsely." When he had a good dream, he used to question whether dreams speak falsely, seeing as in Numbers 10:2, God says, "I speak with him in a dream?" Rava pointed out the potential contradiction between Numbers 10:2 and Zechariah 10:2. The Gemara resolved the contradiction, teaching that Numbers 10:2, "I speak with him in a dream?" refers to dreams that come through an angel, whereas Zechariah 10:2, "The dreams speak falsely," refers to dreams that come through a demon.

The Mishnah deduced from the example of Abimelech and Abraham in Genesis 20:7 that even though an offender pays the victim compensation, the offence is not forgiven until the offender asks the victim for pardon. And the Mishnah deduced from Abraham's example of praying for Abimelech in Genesis 20:17 that under such circumstances, the victim would be churlish not to forgive the offender. The Tosefta further deduced from Genesis 20:17 that even if the offender did not seek forgiveness from the victim, the victim must nonetheless seek mercy for the offender.

Rabbi Isaac taught that Abimelech's curse of Sarah caused her son Isaac's blindness (as reported in Genesis 27:1). Rabbi Isaac read the words, "it is for you a covering (kesut) of the eyes," in Genesis 20:16 not as kesut, "covering," but as kesiyat, "blinding." Rabbi Isaac concluded that one should not consider a small matter the curse of even an ordinary person.

Rava derived from Genesis 20:17 and 21:1–2 the lesson that if one has a need, but prays for another with the same need, then God will answer first the need of the one who prayed. Rava noted that Abraham prayed to God to heal Abimelech and his wife of infertility (in Genesis 20:17) and immediately thereafter God allowed Abraham and Sarah to conceive (in Genesis 21:1–2).

Reading Numbers 21:7, the midrash told that the people realized that they had spoken against Moses and prostrated themselves before him and beseeched him to pray to God on their behalf. The midrash taught that then Numbers 21:7 immediately reports, "And Moses prayed," to demonstrate the meekness of Moses, who did not hesitate to seek mercy for them, and also to show the power of repentance, for as soon as they said, "We have sinned," Moses was immediately reconciled to them, for one who is in a position to forgive should not be cruel by refusing to forgive. In the same strain, Genesis 20:17 reports, "And Abraham prayed to God; and God healed" (after Abimelech had wronged Abraham and asked for forgiveness). And similarly, Job 42:10 reports, "And the Lord changed the fortune of Job, when he prayed for his friends" (after they had slandered him). The midrash taught that when one person wrongs another but then says, "I have sinned," the victim is called a sinner if the victim does not forgive the offender. For in 1 Samuel 12:23, Samuel told the Israelites, "As for me, far be it from me that I should sin against the Lord in ceasing to pray for you," and Samuel told them this after they came and said, "We have sinned," as 1 Samuel 12:19 indicates when it reports that the people said, "Pray for your servants . . . for we have added to all our sins this evil."

=== Genesis chapter 21 ===
The Rabbis linked parts of the parashah to Rosh Hashanah. The Talmud directs that Jews read Genesis 21 (the expulsion of Hagar) on the first day of Rosh Hashanah and Genesis 22 (the binding of Isaac) on the second day. And in the Talmud, Rabbi Eliezer said that God visited both Sarah and Hannah to grant them conception on Rosh Hashanah. Rabbi Eliezer deduced this from the Bible's parallel uses of the words "visiting" and "remembering" in description of Hannah, Sarah, and Rosh Hashanah. First, Rabbi Eliezer linked Hannah's visitation with Rosh Hashanah through the Bible's parallel uses of the word "remembering." 1 Samuel 1:19–20 says that God "remembered" Hannah and she conceived, and Leviticus 23:24 describes Rosh Hashanah as "a remembering of the blast of the trumpet." Then Rabbi Eliezer linked Hannah's conception with Sarah's through the Bible's parallel uses of the word "visiting". 1 Samuel 2:21 says that "the Lord had visited Hannah", and Genesis 21:1 says that "the Lord visited Sarah".

Reading Genesis 21:2, "And Sarah conceived, and bore Abraham a son (Isaac) in his old age, at the set time (מּוֹעֵד, mo'ed) of which God had spoken to him," Rabbi Huna taught in Hezekiah's name that Isaac was born at midday. For Genesis 21:2 uses the term "set time" (מּוֹעֵד, mo'ed), and Deuteronomy 16:6 uses the same term when it reports, "At the season (מּוֹעֵד, mo'ed) that you came forth out of Egypt." As Exodus 12:51 can be read, "And it came to pass in the middle of that day that the Lord brought the children of Israel out of the land of Egypt," we know that Israel left Egypt at midday, and thus Deuteronomy 16:6 refers to midday when it says "season" (מּוֹעֵד, mo'ed), and one can read "season" (מּוֹעֵד, mo'ed) to mean the same thing in both Deuteronomy 16:6 and Genesis 21:2.

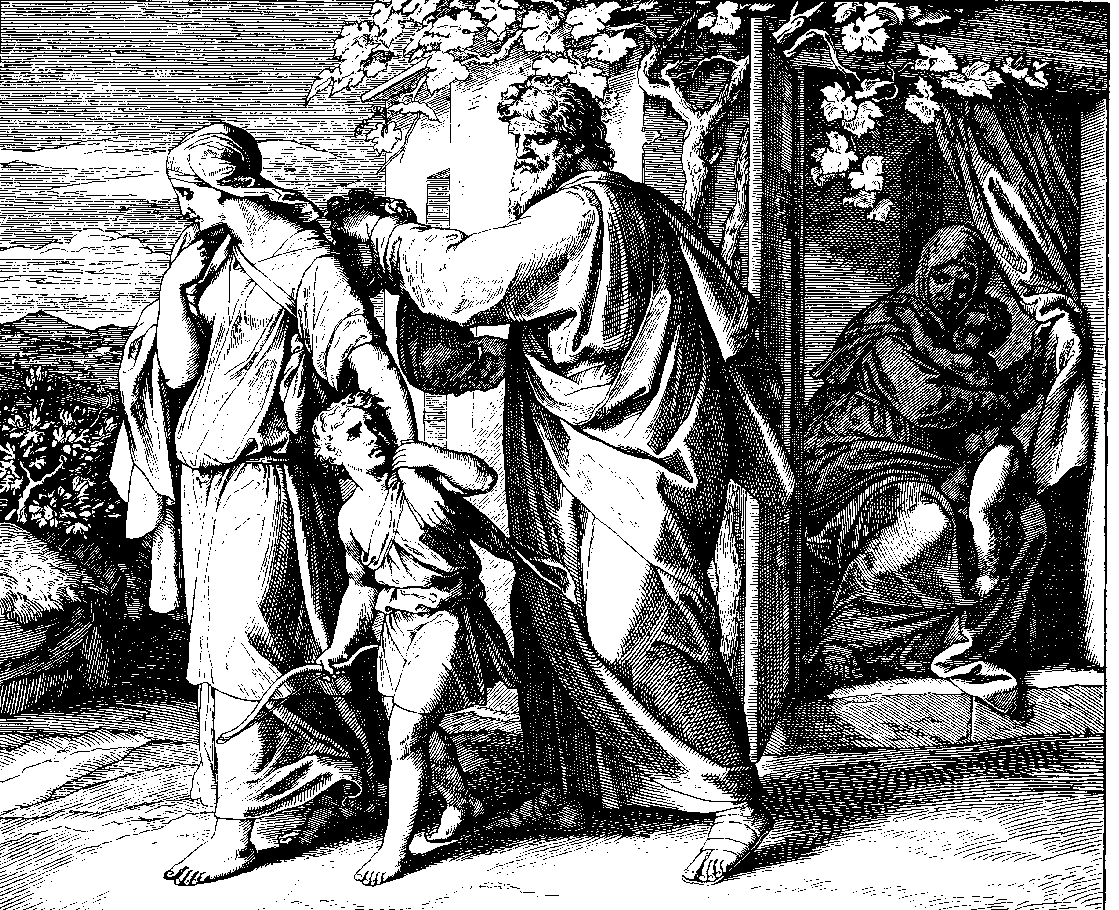
Abraham Sends Hagar and Ishmael into the Desert (woodcut by Julius Schnorr von Carolsfeld from the 1860 Bible in Pictures)

Citing Genesis 21:7, the Pesikta de-Rav Kahana taught that Sarah was one of seven barren women about whom Psalm 113:9 says (speaking of God), "He . . . makes the barren woman to dwell in her house as a joyful mother of children." The Pesikta de-Rav Kahana also listed Rebekah, Rachel, Leah, Manoah's wife, Hannah, and Zion. The Pesikta de-Rav Kahana taught that the words of Psalm 113:9, "He . . . makes the barren woman to dwell in her house," apply, to begin with, to Sarah, for Genesis 11:30 reports that "Sarai was barren." And the words of Psalm 113:9, "a joyful mother of children," apply to Sarah, as well, for Genesis 21:7 also reports that "Sarah gave children suck."

Rav Avira taught (sometimes in the name of Rabbi Ammi, sometimes in the name of Rabbi Assi) that the words "And the child grew, and was weaned (va-yigamal, וַיִּגָּמַל), and Abraham made a great feast on the day that Isaac was weaned" in Genesis 21:8 teach that God will make a great feast for the righteous on the day that God manifests (yigmol) God's love to Isaac's descendants. After they have eaten and drunk, they will ask Abraham to recite the Grace after meals (Birkat Hamazon), but Abraham will answer that he cannot say Grace, because he fathered Ishmael. Then they will ask Isaac to say Grace, but Isaac will answer that he cannot say Grace, because he fathered Esau. Then they will ask Jacob, but Jacob will answer that he cannot, because he married two sisters during both their lifetimes, which Leviticus 18:18 was destined to forbid. Then they will ask Moses, but Moses will answer that he cannot, because God did not allow him to enter the Land of Israel either in life or in death. Then they will ask Joshua, but Joshua will answer that he cannot, because he was not privileged to have a son, for 1 Chronicles 7:27 reports, "Nun was his son, Joshua was his son," without listing further descendants. Then they will ask David, and he will say Grace, and find it fitting for him to do so, because Psalm 116:13 records David saying, "I will lift up the cup of salvation, and call upon the name of the Lord."

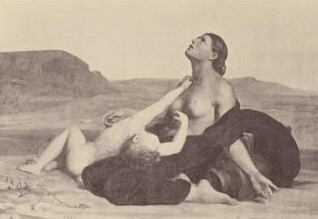
Hagar (19th Century painting by Jean Michel Prosper Guérin)

The Gemara cited Genesis 21:12 to teach that Sarah was one of seven prophetesses who prophesied to Israel and neither took away from nor added anything to what is written in the Torah. (The other prophetesses were Miriam, Deborah, Hannah, Abigail, Huldah, and Esther.) The Gemara established Sarah's status as a prophetess by citing the words, "Haran, the father of Milkah and the father of Yiscah", in Genesis 11:29. Rabbi Isaac taught that Yiscah was Sarah. Genesis 11:29 called her Yiscah (יִסְכָּה) because she discerned (saketah) by means of Divine inspiration, as Genesis 21:12 reports God instructing Abraham, "In all that Sarah says to you, hearken to her voice." Alternatively, Genesis 11:29 called her Yiscah because all gazed (sakin) at her beauty.

The Pirke De-Rabbi Eliezer told that Ishmael cast himself beneath thorns in the wilderness, so that he might get some moisture, and called out to the God of his father Abraham to take away his soul, so that he would not have to die of thirst. And God was entreated, as Genesis 21:17 reports, "God has heard the voice of the lad where he is."

Reading the words "And the angel of God called to Hagar" in Genesis 21:17, a midrash explained that this was for Abraham's sake. While the continuation of Genesis 21:17, "God has heard the voice of the lad where he is," connotes that this was for Ishmael's own sake, for a sick people's prayers on their own behalf are more efficacious than those of anyone else.

The Gemara taught that if one sees Ishmael in a dream, then God hears that person's prayer (perhaps because the name "Ishmael" derives from "the Lord has heard" in Genesis 16:11, or perhaps because "God heard" (yishmah Elohim, יִּשְׁמַע אֱלֹהִים) Ishmael's voice in Genesis 21:17).

Rabbi Isaac said that Heaven judges people only on their actions up to the time of judgment, as Genesis 21:17 says, "God has heard the voice of the lad as he is there." Similarly, reading the words "where he is" in Genesis 21:17, Rabbi Simon told that the ministering angels hastened to indict Ishmael, asking whether God would bring up a well for one who (through his descendants) would one day slay God's children (Israelites) with thirst. God demanded what Ishmael was at that time. The angels answered that Ishmael (at that time) was righteous. God replied that God judges people only as they are at the moment.

Rabbi Benjamin ben Levi and Rabbi Jonathan ben Amram both read the words of Genesis 21:19, "And God opened her eyes and she saw," to teach that all may be presumed to be blind, until God enlightens their eyes.

Rabbi Simeon wept that Hagar, the handmaid of Rabbi Simeon's ancestor Abraham's house, was found worthy of meeting an angel on three occasions, while Rabbi Simeon did not meet an angel even once.

Rabbi Tarfon read Genesis 21:21 to associate Mount Paran with the children of Ishmael. Rabbi Tarfon taught that God came from Mount Sinai (or others say Mount Seir) and was revealed to the children of Esau, as Deuteronomy 33:2 says, "The Lord came from Sinai, and rose from Seir to them," and "Seir" means the children of Esau, as Genesis 36:8 says, "And Esau dwelt in Mount Seir." God asked them whether they would accept the Torah, and they asked what was written in it. God answered that it included (in Exodus 20:13 and Deuteronomy 5:17), "You shall do no murder." The children of Esau replied that they were unable to abandon the blessing with which Isaac blessed Esau in Genesis 27:40, "By your sword shall you live." From there, God turned and was revealed to the children of Ishmael, as Deuteronomy 33:2 says, "He shined forth from Mount Paran," and "Paran" means the children of Ishmael, as Genesis 21:21 says of Ishmael, "And he dwelt in the wilderness of Paran." God asked them whether they would accept the Torah, and they asked what was written in it. God answered that it included (in Exodus 20:13 and Deuteronomy 5:17), "You shall not steal." The children of Ishmael replied that they were unable to abandon their fathers' custom, as Joseph said in Genesis 40:15 (referring to the Ishmaelites' transaction reported in Genesis 37:28), "For indeed I was stolen away out of the land of the Hebrews." From there, God sent messengers to all the nations of the world asking them whether they would accept the Torah, and they asked what was written in it. God answered that it included (in Exodus 20:3 and Deuteronomy 5:7, "You shall have no other gods before me." They replied that they had no delight in the Torah, therefore let God give it to God's people, as Psalm 29:11 says, "The Lord will give strength [identified with the Torah] to His people; the Lord will bless His people with peace." From there, God returned and was revealed to the children of Israel, as Deuteronomy 33:2 says, "And he came from the ten thousands of holy ones," and the expression "ten thousands" means the children of Israel, as Numbers 10:36 says, "And when it rested, he said, 'Return, O Lord, to the ten thousands of the thousands of Israel.'" With God were thousands of chariots and 20,000 angels, and God's right hand held the Torah, as Deuteronomy 33:2 says, "At his right hand was a fiery law to them."

The Sifre cited Abraham's reproval of Abimelech in Genesis 21:25 as an example of a tradition of admonition near death. The Sifre read Deuteronomy 1:3–4 to indicate that Moses spoke to the Israelites in rebuke. The Sifre taught that Moses rebuked them only when he approached death, and the Sifre taught that Moses learned this lesson from Jacob, who admonished his sons in Genesis 49 only when he neared death. The Sifre cited four reasons why people do not admonish others until the admonisher nears death: (1) so that the admonisher does not have to repeat the admonition, (2) so that the one rebuked would not suffer undue shame from being seen again, (3) so that the one rebuked would not bear ill will to the admonisher, and (4) so that the one may depart from the other in peace, for admonition brings peace. The Sifre cited as examples of admonition near death: (1) when Abraham reproved Abimelech in Genesis 21:25, (2) when Isaac reproved Abimelech, Ahuzzath, and Phicol in Genesis 26:27, (3) when Joshua admonished the Israelites in Joshua 24:15, (4) when Samuel admonished the Israelites in 1 Samuel 12:34–35, and (5) when David admonished Solomon in 1 Kings 2:1.

Reading the report of Genesis 21:25, "And Abraham reproved Abimelech," Rabbi Jose bar Rabbi Ḥanina taught that reproof leads to love, as Proverbs 9:8 says, "Reprove a wise man, and he will love you." Rabbi Jose bar Ḥanina said that love unaccompanied by reproof is not love. And Resh Lakish taught that reproof leads to peace, and thus (as Genesis 21:25 reports) "Abraham reproved Abimelech." Resh Lakish said that peace unaccompanied by reproof is not peace.

Rav Nachman taught that when Jacob "took his journey with all that he had, and came to Beersheba" in Genesis 46:1, he went to cut down the cedars that Genesis 21:33 reports his grandfather Abraham had planted there.

=== Genesis chapter 22 ===
Rabbi Joḥanan, on the authority of Rabbi Jose ben Zimra, asked what Genesis 22:1 means by the word "after" in "And it came to pass after these words, that God did tempt Abraham." Rabbi Joḥanan explained that it meant after the words of Satan following the events of Genesis 21:8, rather than after the events involving Abraham and Abimelech in Genesis 21:22-34. Genesis 21:8 reports that Isaac grew and was weaned, and Abraham made a great feast on the day that Isaac was weaned. Satan asked God how it could be that God graciously granted Abraham a child at the age of 100, yet of all that feast, Abraham did not sacrifice one turtledove or pigeon to God; rather, Abraham did nothing but honor his son. God replied that were God to ask Abraham to sacrifice his son to God, Abraham would do so without hesitation. Straightaway, as Genesis 22:1 reports, "God did tempt Abraham."

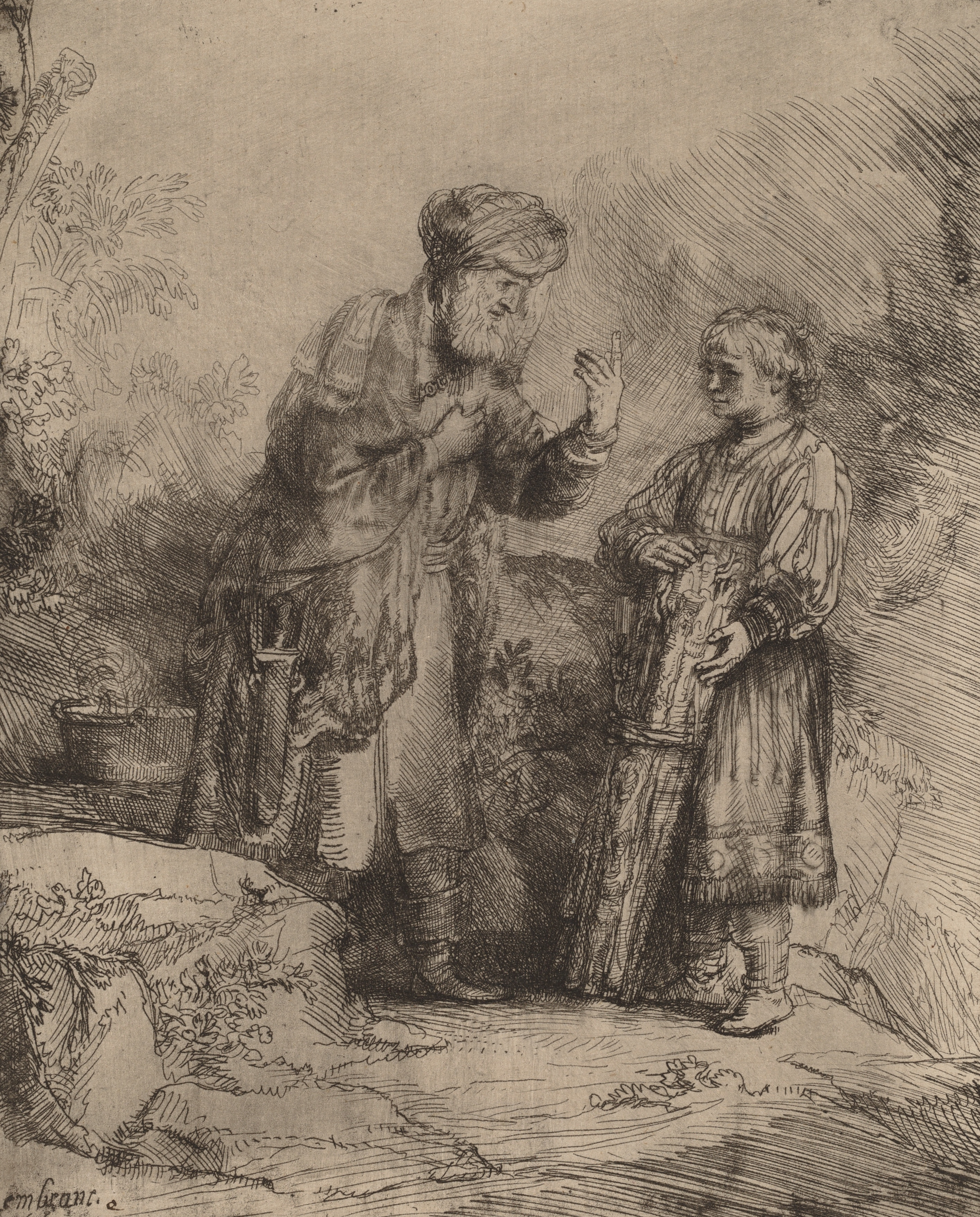
Abraham and Isaac (1645 etching by Rembrandt at the National Gallery of Art)

Rabbi Levi, however, explained the words "after these words" in Genesis 22:1 to mean after Ishmael's words to Isaac. Ishmael told Isaac that Ishmael was more virtuous than Isaac in good deeds, for Isaac was circumcised at eight days (and so could not prevent it), but Ishmael was circumcised at 13 years. Isaac questioned whether Ishmael would incense Isaac on account of one limb. Isaac vowed that if God were to ask Isaac to sacrifice himself before God, Isaac would obey. Immediately thereafter (in the words of Genesis 22:1) "God did prove Abraham."

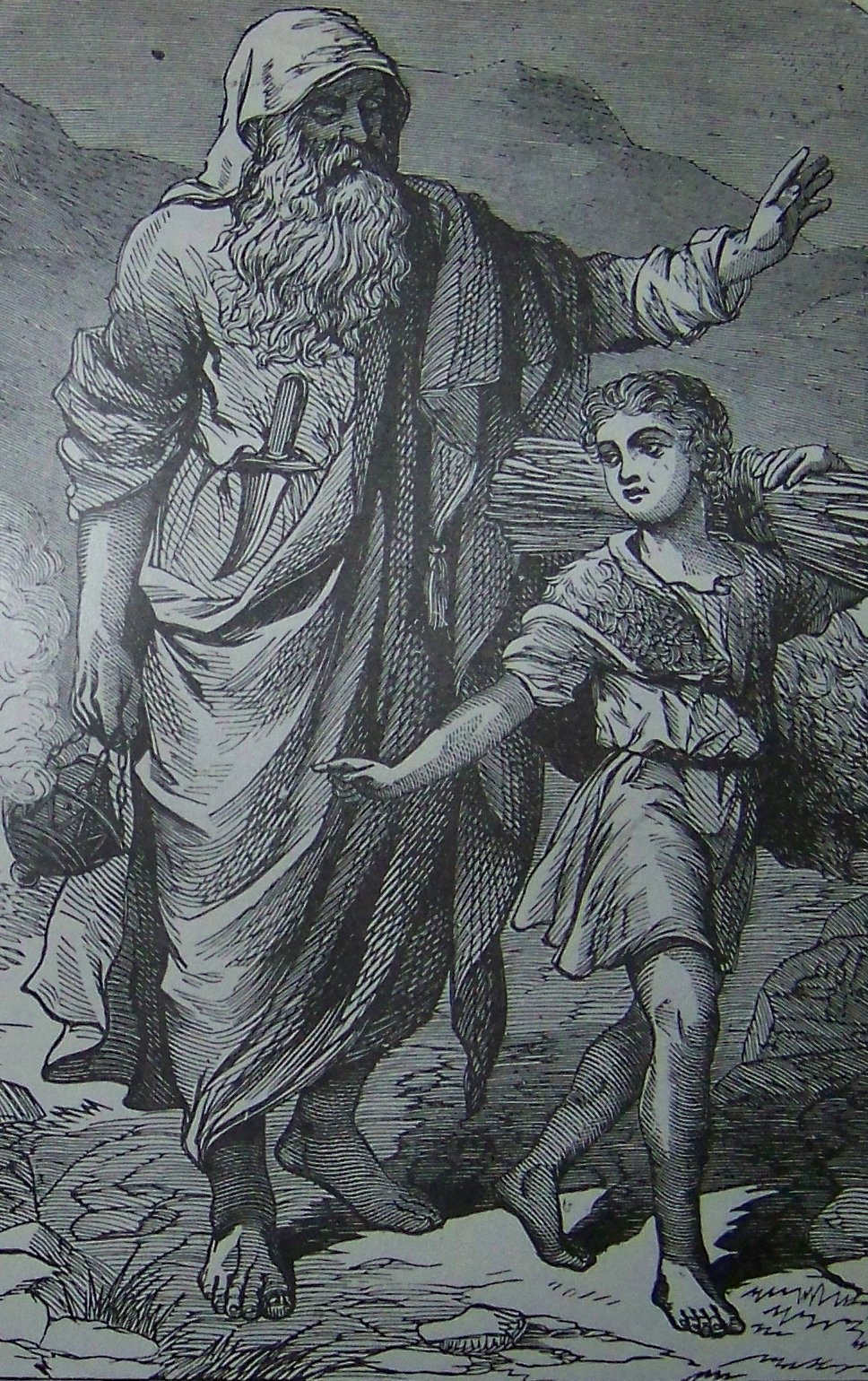
Abraham Going up To Offer Isaac as a Sacrifice (illustration from the 1890 Holman Bible)

A midrash taught that Abraham said (beginning with the words of Genesis 22:1 and 22:11) "'Here I am'—ready for priesthood, ready for kingship" (ready to serve God in whatever role God chose), and Abraham attained both priesthood and kingship. He attained priesthood, as Psalm 110:4 says, "The Lord has sworn, and will not repent: 'You are a priest forever after the manner of Melchizedek." And he attained kingship, as Genesis 23:6 says, "You are a mighty prince among us."

Rabbi Simeon bar Abba explained that the word na (נָא) in Genesis 22:2, "Take, I pray (na, נָא) your son," can denote only entreaty. Rabbi Simeon bar Abba compared this to a king who was confronted by many wars, which he won with the aid of a great warrior. Subsequently, he was faced with a severe battle. Thereupon the king asked the warrior, "I pray, assist me in battle, so that people may not say that there was nothing to the earlier battles." Similarly, God said to Abraham, "I have tested you with many trials and you withstood all of them. Now, be firm, for My sake in this trial, so that people may not say that there was nothing to the earlier trials."

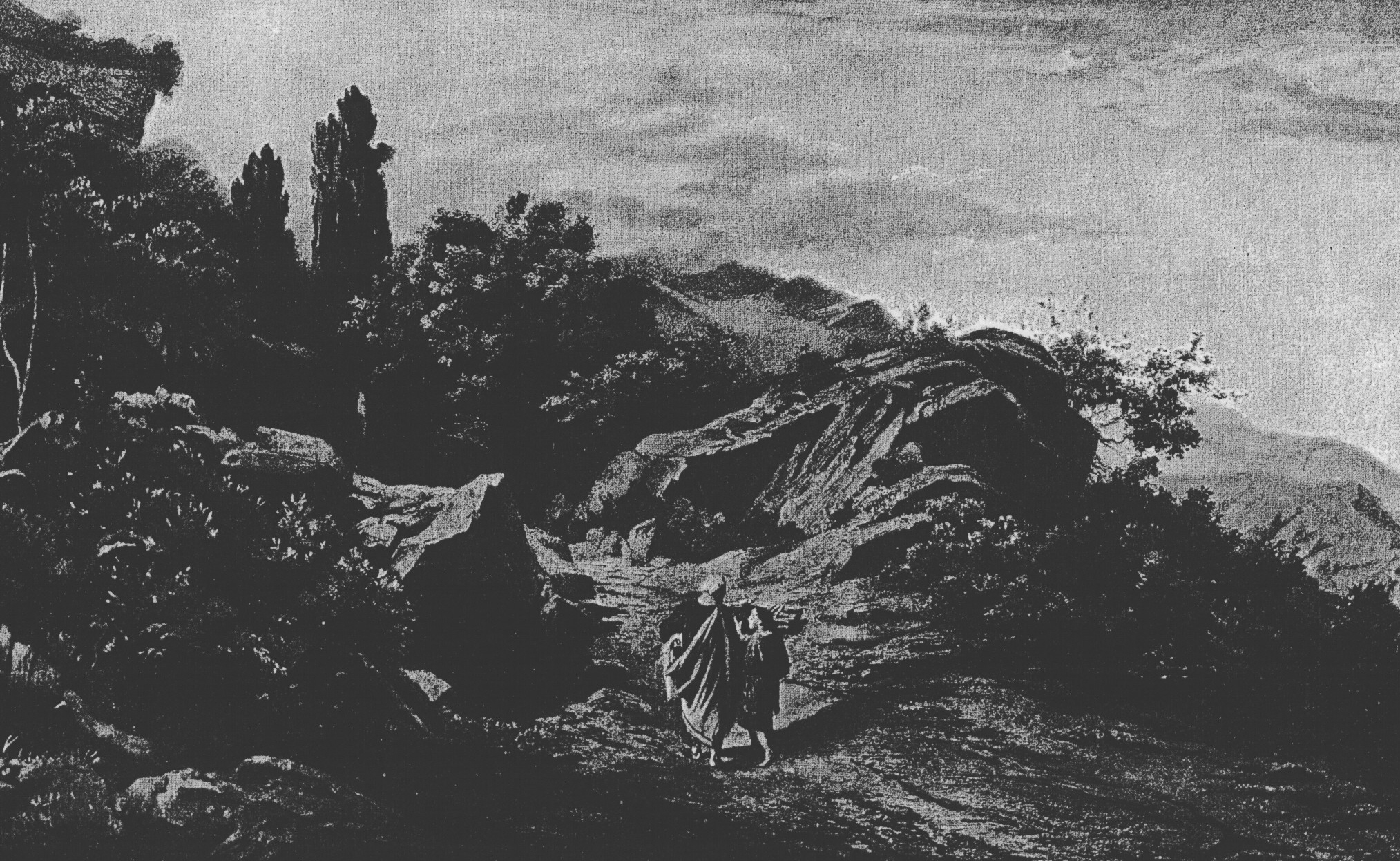
Abraham Climbs Mount Moriah (illustration by Schirmer from the 1908 Bible and Its Story Taught by One Thousand Picture Lessons)

The Gemara expanded on Genesis 22:2, explaining that it reports only one side of a dialog. God told Abraham, “Take your son," but Abraham replied, "I have two sons!" God said, "Your only one," but Abraham replied, "Each is the only one of his mother!" God said, "Whom you love," but Abraham replied, "I love them both!" Then God said, "Isaac!" The Gemara explained that God employed all this circumlocution in Genesis 22:2 so that Abraham's mind should not reel under the sudden shock of God's command.

A baraita interpreted Leviticus 12:3 to teach that the whole eighth day is valid for circumcision, but deduced from Abraham's rising "early in the morning" to perform his obligations in Genesis 22:3 that the zealous perform circumcisions early in the morning.

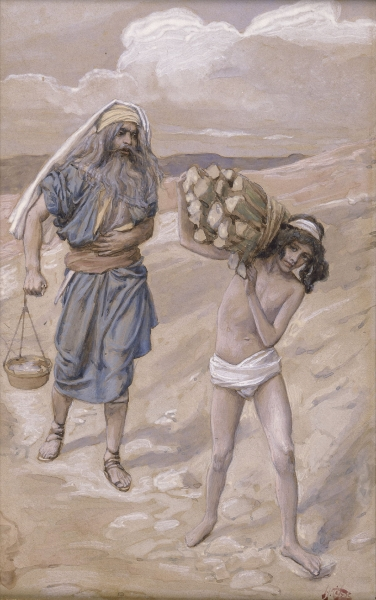
Isaac Bears the Wood for His Sacrifice (gouache on board, c. 1896–1902 by James Tissot)

A Tanna taught in the name of Rabbi Simeon ben Eleazar that intense love and hate can cause one to disregard the perquisites of one's social position. The Tanna deduced that love may do so from Abraham, for Genesis 22:3 reports that "Abraham rose early in the morning, and saddled his donkey," rather than allow his servant to do so. Similarly, the Tanna deduced that hate may do so from Balaam, for Numbers 22:21 reports that "Balaam rose up in the morning, and saddled his donkey," rather than allow his servant to do so.

Rabbi Isaac noted that Isaac was 37 years old when Abraham bound him (based on the report of Genesis 23:1 after the binding of Isaac that Sarah died at the age of 127, and Genesis 17:17 and 21:5 report that Sarah was 90 years old when Isaac was born). Rabbi Isaac argued that one cannot bind a 37-year-old without his consent. Rabbi Isaac thus told that when Abraham sought to bind his son Isaac, Isaac expressed concern that he would tremble in fear of the knife and would thereby upset Abraham or perhaps render the slaughter unfit as a valid offering. Therefore, Isaac asked Abraham to bind him well.

The Sifra cited Genesis 22:11, Genesis 46:2, Exodus 3:4, and 1 Samuel 3:10 for the proposition that when God called the name of a prophet twice, God expressed affection and sought to provoke a response. Similarly, Rabbi Hiyya taught that it was an expression of love and encouragement. Rabbi Liezer taught that the repetition indicated that God spoke to Abraham and to future generations. Rabbi Liezer taught that there is no generation that does not contain people like Abraham, Jacob, Moses, and Samuel.

Noting that Isaac was saved on Mount Moriah in Genesis 22:11–12, the Jerusalem Talmud concluded that since Isaac was saved, it was as if all Israel was saved.

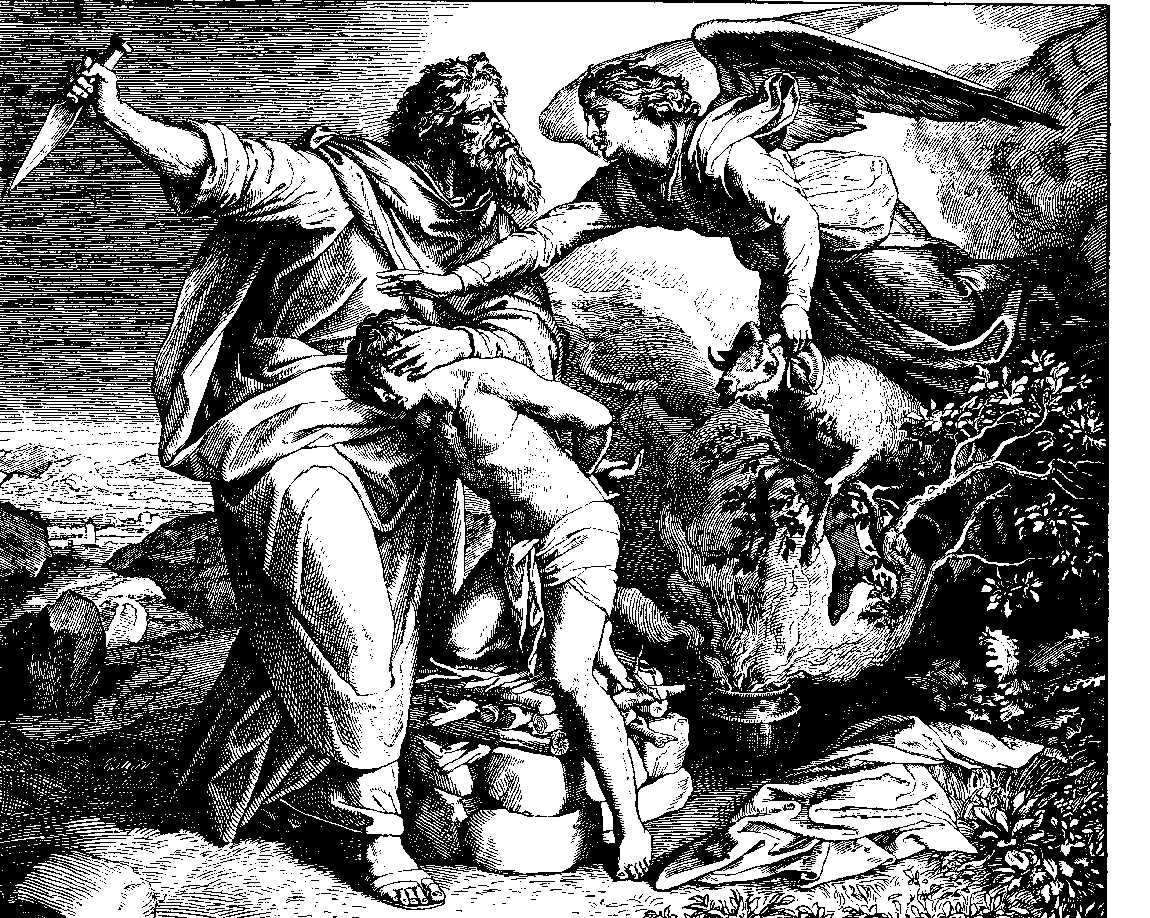
Abraham Prepared To Sacrifice His Son Isaac (woodcut by Julius Schnorr von Carolsfeld from the 1860 Bible in Pictures)

Reading Genesis 22:13, "And Abraham lifted up his eyes, and looked, and behold behind (אַחַר, ahar) him a ram caught in the thicket by his horns," the Jerusalem Talmud asked what was the meaning of "behind (אַחַר, ahar)" which the Jerusalem Talmud read as "after." Rabbi Judah the son of Rabbi Simon taught that it meant that Abraham saw prophetically that after generations, his descendants would be caught up in sins and entrapped in troubles. But in the end, they would be redeemed by the horn of this ram. As Zechariah 9:14 says, “the Lord God will blow the horn, and will go with whirlwinds of the south.” And Rabbi Hunah taught in the name of Rabbi Hinenah bar Isaac that for that entire day, Abraham saw that the ram would get caught in one tree and free itself, get caught in a bush and free itself, and then get caught in a thicket and free itself. God told Abraham that this was how his descendants in the future would be caught by their sins and trapped by the kingdoms, from Babylonia to the Medes, from the Medes to Greece, from Greece to Edom (that is, Rome). Abraham asked God whether that was how it would be forever. And God replied that in the end, they would be redeemed by the horn of this ram. As Zechariah 9:14 says, “the Lord God will blow the horn, and will go with whirlwinds of the south.” Similarly, noting that Genesis 22:13 reports that "Abraham lifted up his eyes, and looked, and behold behind him (אַחַר, ahar) a ram," a midrash asked what "behind" (אַחַר, ahar) meant. Rabbi Judan taught that it meant after all that happened, Israel would still fall into the clutches of sin and thus become victims of persecution. But they would be ultimately redeemed by the ram's horn, as Zechariah 9:14 says, "And the Lord God will blow the horn." Similarly, Rav Huna son of Rabbi Isaac read Genesis 22:13 to teach that God showed Abraham the ram tearing itself free from one thicket and getting entangled in another. God told Abraham that in a similar manner, Abraham's children would be caught by the nations and entangled in troubles, being dragged from empire to empire, from Babylon to Media, from Media to Greece, and from Greece to Edom (Rome), but they would ultimately be redeemed through the horns of the ram. And hence Zechariah 9:14 says, "The Lord shall be seen over them, and His arrow shall go forth as the lightning; and the Lord God will blow the horn."

Rabbi Josiah taught in his father's name that God created the ram that Genesis 22:13 reports Abraham sacrificed in lieu of Isaac on the eve of the first Sabbath at twilight (indicating the miraculous nature of its appearance).

Rabbi Elazar noted that Isaiah 2:3 says, "And many peoples shall go and say: 'Go and let us go up to the mountain of the Lord, to the house of the God of Jacob,'" and asked why the verse refers only to Jacob, and not to Abraham and Isaac. Rabbi Elazar explained that the Temple will ultimately be described in the same way that Jacob referred to it in Genesis 28:19. It will not be referred to as it was referred to by Abraham, for when he prayed at the location of the Temple mount, he called it "mount," as Genesis 22:14 says, "As it is said on this day: On the mount where the Lord is seen." And it will not be referred to as it was referred to by Isaac, for he called the location of the Temple "field" when he prayed there, as Genesis 24:63 says, "And Isaac went out to meditate in the field." Rather, it will be described as Jacob referred to it, as a "house," as Genesis 28:19 says, "And he called the name of that place Beth-El," which means "house of God."

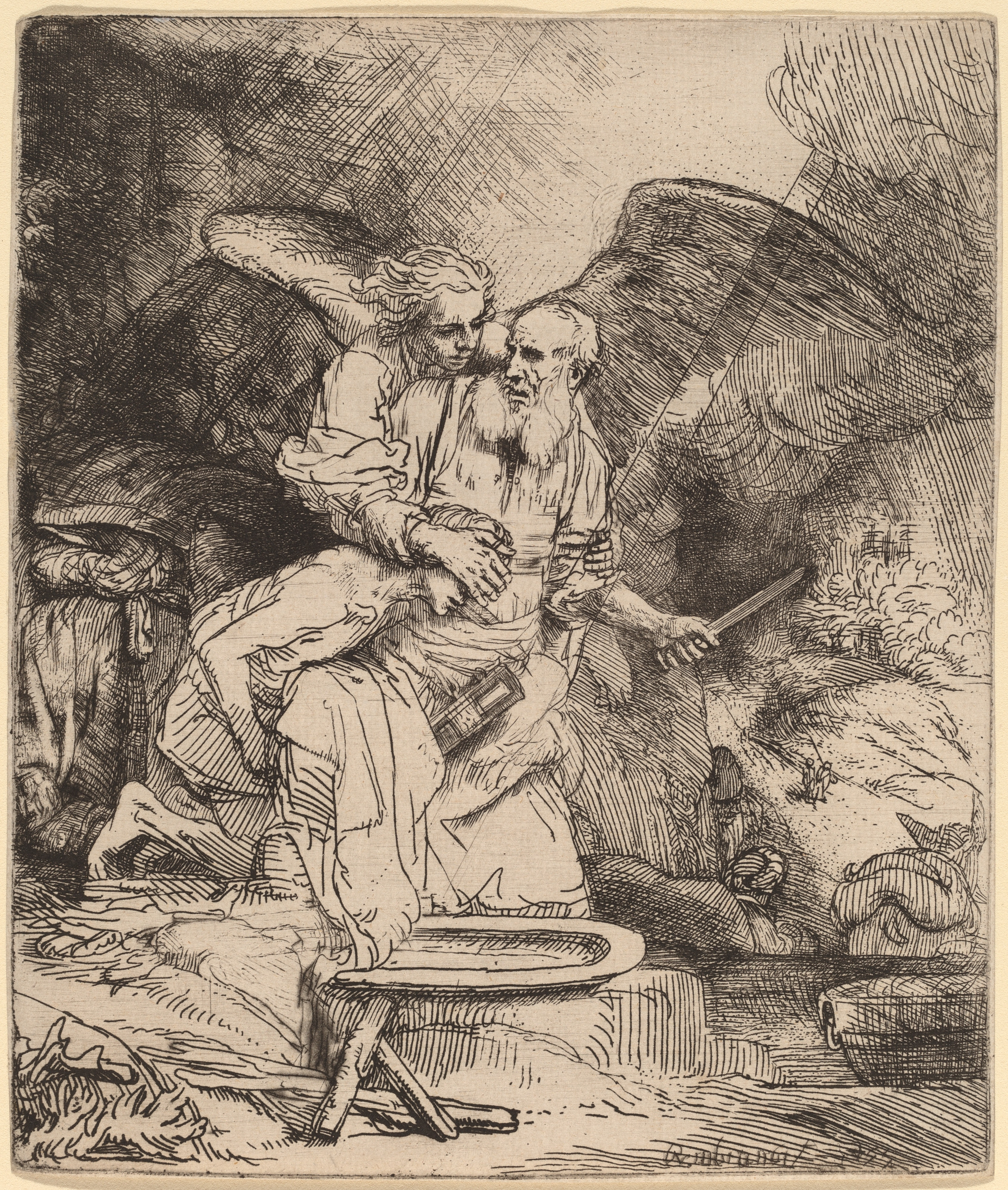
Abraham's Sacrifice (1655 etching by Rembrandt in the National Gallery of Art)

Some say the merit of Abraham's actions saved later Israelites. 2 Samuel 24:1–16 reports that after David ordered a census of the Israelites, God punished the Israelites with a plague. 1 Chronicles 21:15 then reports, "And as He was about to destroy, the Lord beheld, and He repented Him." The Gemara asked what God beheld that caused God to withhold destruction. Samuel taught that God beheld the ashes of Isaac. For in Genesis 22:8, Abraham says, "God will see for Himself the lamb." (Thus, God saw the merit of the sacrifice that Abraham intended to bring.) Alternatively, Rabbi Joḥanan taught that God saw the Temple. For Genesis 22:14 explained the meaning of the name that Abraham gave to the mountain where Abraham nearly sacrificed Isaac to be, "In the mount where the Lord is seen." (Solomon later built the Temple on that mountain, and God saw the merit of the sacrifices there.) Rabbi Jacob bar Iddi and Rabbi Samuel bar Nahmani differed on the matter. One said that God saw the atonement money that Exodus 30:16 reports God required Moses to collect from the Israelites, while the other said that God saw the Temple. The Gemara concluded that the more likely view was that God saw the Temple, as Genesis 22:14 can be read to say, "As it will be said on that day, 'in the mount where the Lord is seen.'"

Rabbi Abbahu taught that Jews sound a blast with a shofar made from a ram's horn on Rosh Hashanah, because God instructed them to do so to bring before God the memory of the binding of Isaac, in whose stead Abraham sacrificed a ram, and thus God will ascribe it to worshipers as if they had bound themselves before God. Rabbi Isaac asked why one sounds (תוקעין, tokin) a blast on Rosh Hashanah, and the Gemara answered that God states in Psalm 81:4: "Sound (תִּקְעוּ, tiku) a shofar."

Rabbi Bibi said that Rabbi Abba said in the name of Rabbi Yohanan that Abraham prayed to God that God knew that when God told Abraham to offer up Isaac, Abraham had a good answer to give God, in that earlier, God told Abraham in Genesis 21:12, "Be not displeased because of the lad and because of your slave woman; whatever Sarah says to you, do as she tells you, for through Isaac shall your descendants be named." But then in Genesis 22:2, God told Abraham, “Take your son, your only son Isaac, whom you love, and go to the land of Moriah and offer him there as a burnt offering upon one of the mountains of which I shall tell you.” But, Abraham continued, he did not give God that answer, but overcame his impulse and did what God wanted. Abraham asked God that it might please God that when Isaac's descendants came to a time of trouble and would have no one to speak on their behalf, God would speak on their behalf. Rabbi Bibi argued that Genesis 22:14 alludes to Abraham's prayer when it says, “And Abraham called the name of that place ‘Adonai will see.’” Abraham prayed that when Isaac’s descendants would be distressed, God would be reminded of (and see) the binding of Isaac, their father, and have mercy on Isaac’s descendants.

The Mishnah taught that on public fasts when Israel was afflicted with drought, the Israelites would conclude a prayer with, “He Who answered Abraham on Mount Moriah [as reported in Genesis 22:11–18], He shall answer you and hearken this day to the voice of your cry.”

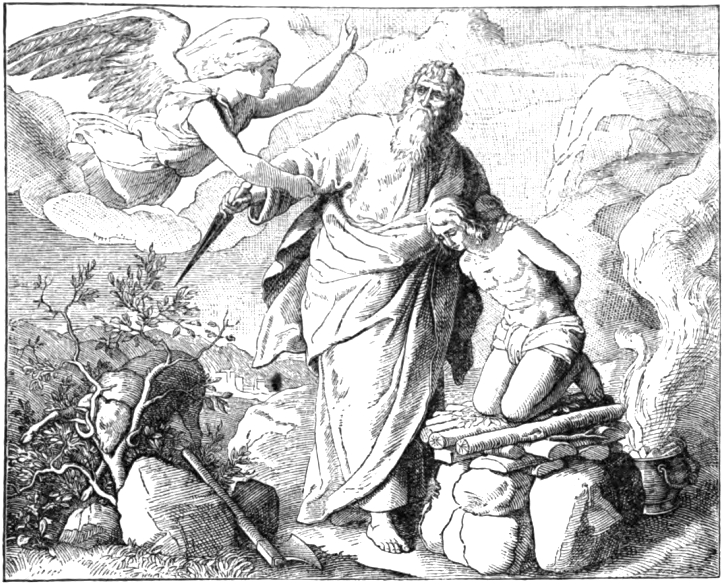
Abraham Offers Isaac (illustration from Henry Davenport Northrop's 1894 Treasures of the Bible)

God's promise to Abraham in Genesis 22:17 that God would multiply his children like the stars figures in a midrashic interpretation of the Plagues of Egypt. Finding four instances of the verb "to charge," for example in Exodus 1:22 (וַיְצַו, vayetzan), a midrash taught that Pharaoh decreed upon the Israelites four decrees. At first, he commanded the taskmasters to insist that the Israelites make the prescribed number of bricks. Then he commanded that the taskmasters not allow the Israelites to sleep in their homes, intending by this to limit their ability to have children. The taskmasters told the Israelites that if they went home to sleep, they would lose a few hours each morning from work and never complete the allotted number or bricks, as Exodus 5:13 reports: "And the taskmasters were urgent, saying: 'Fulfill your work.'" So the Israelites slept on the ground in the brickyard. God told the Egyptians that God had promised the Israelites' ancestor Abraham that God would multiply his children like the stars, as in Genesis 22:17 God promised Abraham: "That in blessing I will bless you, and in multiplying, I will multiply your seed as the stars of the heaven." But now the Egyptians were cunningly planning that the Israelites not increase. So God set about to see that God's word prevail, and immediately Exodus 1:12 reports: "But the more they afflicted them, the more they multiplied." When Pharaoh saw that the Israelites increased abundantly despite his decrees, he then decreed concerning the male children, as Exodus 1:15–16 reports: "And the king of Egypt spoke to the Hebrew midwives . . . and he said: 'When you do the office of a midwife to the Hebrew women, you shall look upon the birthstool: if it be a son, then you shall kill him.'" So finally (as Exodus 1:22 reports), "Pharaoh charged all his people, saying: 'Every son that is born you shall cast into the river.'"

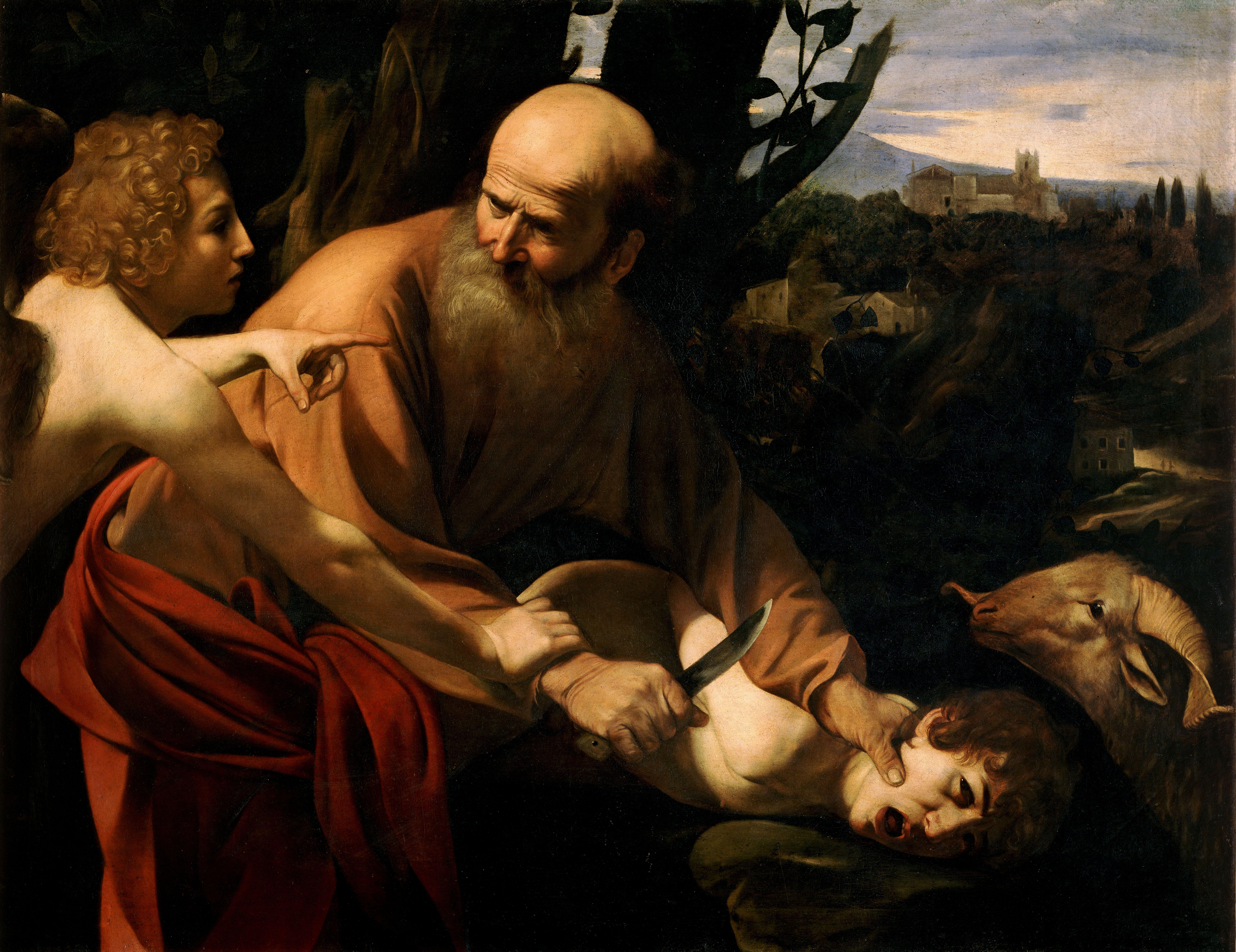
The Sacrifice of Isaac (painting c. 1590–1610 by Caravaggio)

Noting that Genesis 22:19 speaks of only Abraham when it says, "So Abraham returned to his young men," a midrash asked: Where was Isaac? Rabbi Berekiah said in the name of the Rabbis of Babylon that Abraham sent Isaac to Shem to study Torah. The midrash compared this to a woman who became wealthy through her spinning. She concluded that since she had become wealthy through her distaff, it would never leave her hand. Similarly, Abraham deduced that since all that had come to him was only because he engaged in Godly pursuits, he was unwilling that those should ever depart from his descendants. And Rabbi Jose the son of Rabbi Ḥaninah taught that Abraham sent Isaac home at night, for fear of the evil eye.

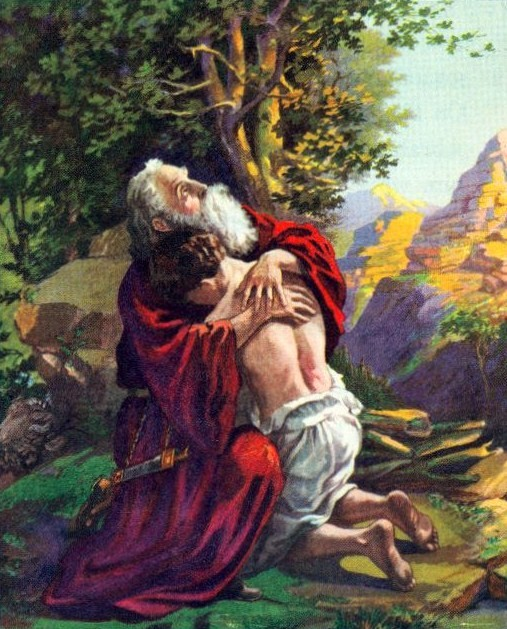
Abraham embraces his son Isaac after receiving him back from God (illustration by O.A. Stemler published 1927 in Standard Bible Story Readers: Book Four)

A midrash interpreted the words "his eyes were dim from seeing" in Genesis 27:1 to teach that Isaac's eyesight dimmed as a result of his near sacrifice in Genesis 22, for when Abraham bound Isaac, the ministering angels wept, as Isaiah 33:7 says, "Behold, their valiant ones cry without, the angels of peace weep bitterly," and tears dropped from the angels' eyes into Isaac's, leaving their mark and causing Isaac's eyes to dim when he became old.

A midrash told that at the very moment in Genesis 22:11–12 that the angel of the Lord stayed Abraham from sacrificing Isaac, the Satan appeared to Sarah in the guise of Isaac. When Sarah saw him, she asked what Abraham had done to him. He told Sarah that Abraham had taken him to a mountain, built an altar, placed wood upon it, tied him down on it, and took a knife to slaughter him, and had God not told him not to lay a hand on him, Abraham would have slaughtered him. And as soon as he finished speaking, Sarah's soul departed. Thus the midrash deduced from the words "Abraham came to mourn for Sarah, and to weep for her" in Genesis 23:2 that Abraham came directly from Mount Moriah and the binding of Isaac.

A midrash asked why, in Genesis 46:1, Jacob "offered sacrifices to the God of his father Isaac," and not to the God of Abraham and Isaac. Rabbi Berekiah observed that God never unites God's Name with a living person (to say, for example, "I am the God of Jacob," while they are alive) except with those who are experiencing suffering. (And thus, Jacob referred to the God of Isaac instead of the God of Jacob.) And Rabbi Berekiah also observed that Isaac did indeed experience suffering. The Rabbis said that we look upon Isaac as if his ashes were heaped in a pile on the altar. (And thus Jacob referred to Isaac to invoke the memory of Abraham's near-sacrifice of Isaac in Genesis 22 as if it had been carried out).

Interpreting God's command to Isaac in Genesis 26:2 not to go to Egypt, Rabbi Hoshaya taught that God told Isaac that he was, by virtue of his near-sacrifice in Genesis 22, a burnt-offering without blemish, and as a burnt offering became unfit if it was taken outside of the Temple grounds, so would Isaac become unfit if he went outside of the Promised Land.

== In medieval Jewish interpretation ==
The parashah is discussed in these medieval Jewish sources:

=== Genesis chapters 11–22 ===
In their commentaries to Mishnah Avot 5:3 (see "In classical rabbinic interpretation" above), Rashi and Maimonides differed on what 10 trials Abraham faced:

	Rashi		Maimonides
1	Abraham hid underground for 13 years from King Nimrod, who wanted to kill him.		
2	Nimrod threw Abraham into a fiery furnace.		
3	God commanded Abraham to leave his family and homeland.	1	Abraham's exile from his family and homeland
4	As soon as he arrived in the Promised Land, Abraham was forced to leave to escape a famine.	2	The famine in the Promised Land after God assured Abraham that he would become a great nation there
5	Pharaoh's officials kidnapped Sarah.	3	The corruption in Egypt that resulted in the kidnapping of Sarah
6	Kings captured Lot, and Abraham had to rescue him.	4	The war with the four kings
7	God told Abraham that his descendants would suffer under four regimes.		
		5	Abraham's marriage to Hagar after having despaired that Sarah would ever give birth
8	God commanded Abraham to circumcise himself and his son when Abraham was 99 years old.	6	The commandment of circumcision
		7	Abimelech's abduction of Sarah
9	Abraham was commanded to drive away Ishmael and Hagar.	8	Driving away Hagar after she had given birth
		9	The very distasteful command to drive away Ishmael
10	God commanded Abraham to sacrifice Isaac.	10	The binding of Isaac on the altar

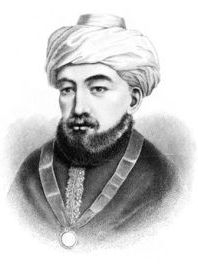
Maimonides

=== Genesis chapter 18 ===
Reading Genesis 18:19, "For I (God) have known him (Abraham), to the end that he may command his children and his household after him, that they may keep the way of the Lord, to do righteousness and justice," Baḥya ibn Paquda suggested that this points to how Israel's ancestors handed down the knowledge of God to their descendants. Baḥya explained that this tradition is why in Exodus 3:15, God identified God's self to Moses as "The Lord, the God of your fathers, the God of Abraham, the God of Isaac, and the God of Jacob, has sent me to you: This shall be My name forever." God thus identified God's self to the Israelites through the way that they gained knowledge of God.

In his letter to Obadiah the Proselyte, Maimonides relied on Genesis 18:19 to addressed whether a convert could recite declarations like "God of our fathers." Maimonides wrote that converts may say such declarations in the prescribed order and not change them in the least and may bless and pray in the same way as every Jew by birth. Maimonides reasoned that Abraham taught the people, brought many under the wings of the Divine Presence, and ordered members of his household after him to keep God's ways forever. As God said of Abraham in Genesis 18:19, "I have known him to the end that he may command his children and his household after him, that they may keep the way of the Lord, to do righteousness and justice." Ever since then, Maimonides taught, whoever adopts Judaism is counted among the disciples of Abraham. They are Abraham's household, and Abraham converted them to righteousness. In the same way that Abraham converted his contemporaries, he converts future generations through the testament that he left behind him. Thus Abraham is the father of his posterity who keep his ways and of all proselytes who adopt Judaism. Therefore, Maimonides counseled converts to pray, "God of our fathers," because Abraham is their father. They should pray, "You who have taken for his own our fathers," for God gave the land to Abraham when in Genesis 13:17, God said, "Arise, walk through the land in the length of it and in the breadth of it; for I will give to you." Maimonides concluded that there is no difference between converts and born Jews. Both should say the blessing, "Who has chosen us," "Who has given us," "Who have taken us for Your own," and "Who has separated us"; for God has chosen converts and separated them from the nations and given them the Torah. For the Torah has been given to born Jews and proselytes alike, as Numbers 15:15 says, "One ordinance shall be both for you of the congregation, and also for the stranger that sojourns with you, an ordinance forever in your generations; as you are, so shall the stranger be before the Lord." Maimonides counseled converts not to consider their origin as inferior. While born Jews descend from Abraham, Isaac, and Jacob, converts derive from God, through whose word the world was created. As Isaiah said in Isaiah 44:5: "One shall say, I am the Lord's, and another shall call himself by the name of Jacob."

The Midrash ha-Ne'lam (The Midrash of the Concealed) contrasted Abraham with Noah, noting that Noah did not shield his generation and did not pray for them as Abraham did for his. For as soon as God told Abraham in Genesis 18:20, "the cry of Sodom and Gomorrah is great," immediately in Genesis 18:23, "Abraham drew near, and said." Abraham countered God with more and more words until he implored that if just ten righteous people were found there, God would grant atonement to the generation for their sake. Abraham thought that there were ten in the city, counting Lot and his wife, his daughters and sons-in-law, and that is why he beseeched no further.

Maimonides taught that when Scripture reports that God intended "to descend," it signals that God meant to punish humanity, as in Genesis 11:5, "And the Lord came down to see"; Genesis 11:7, "Let us go down and there confound their language"; and Genesis 18:21, "I will go down now and see."

=== Genesis chapter 19 ===
Baḥya ibn Paquda read the story of Lot and Zoar in Genesis 19:20–23 to teach that the presence of one who trusts in God brings good fortune to a city and shields its people from troubles.

=== Genesis chapter 22 ===
Baḥya ibn Paquda read Genesis 22 to show Abraham reaching such a high level that he regarded everything as insignificant when compared with the fulfillment of God's commandment.

== In modern interpretation ==
The parashah is discussed in these modern sources:

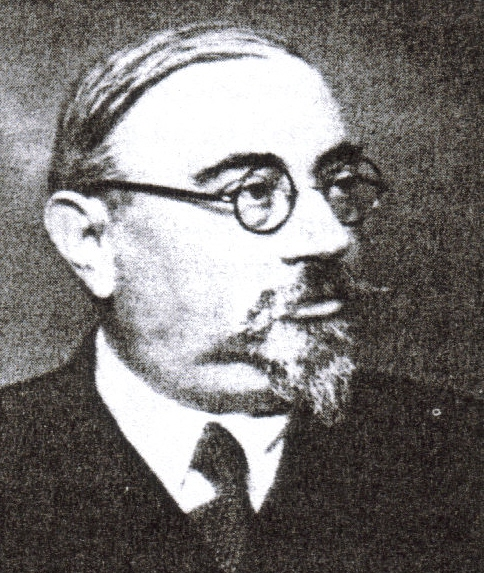
Cassuto

=== Genesis chapters 11–22 ===
Umberto Cassuto identified the following chiastic structure in Abraham's 10 trials in Genesis 12–22:

A—"Go from your country . . ."; leave his father; blessings and promises (Genesis 12:1–7)

B—Sarai is in danger from Pharaoh; a sanctuary is founded at Bethel and the name of the Lord is proclaimed (Genesis 12:10–13:4)

C—Lot goes away (Genesis 13:5–18)

D—Lot is in jeopardy and is saved (Genesis 14–15)

E—Threat to the birth of the first-born; birth of Ishmael; covenant to be fulfilled through second son (Genesis 16–17)
E^{1}—Covenant of circumcision; birth of Isaac foretold (Genesis 17–18:15)

D^{1}—Lot is in jeopardy and is saved (Genesis 18:17–19:28)

C^{1}—Sarah is in danger from Abimelech (Genesis 20:1–21:7)

B^{1}—Hagar and Ishmael go away; a sanctuary is founded at Beersheba and the name of the Lord is proclaimed (Genesis 21:8–34)

A^{1}—Go to the land of Moriah; bid farewell to his son; blessings and promises (Genesis 22)

John Van Seters argued that the Abraham cycle was a postexilic invention of the 5th century c.e. or later.

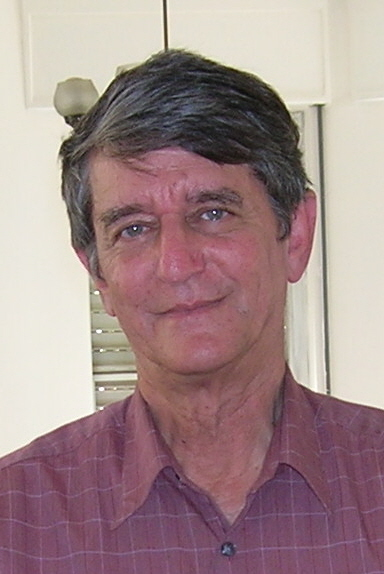
Kugel

James Kugel wrote that over the last 100 years, scholarship has performed something of a zigzag about the historicity of Abraham. In the late 19th century, scholars were often skeptical of the Biblical account and believed that someone (the Jahwist or Elohist) who lived long after the Israelites had settled Canaan made up the Abrahamic stories to justify that settlement, to claim that although Israel's ancestor had arrived from a distant region, God had granted the land to Abraham. Then, early in the 20th century, archaeologists began turning up evidence that seemed to confirm, or at least coincide with, elements of the Genesis narrative, including evidence of Abraham's hometown, Ur; legal practices, customs, and a way of life that suited the Abrahamic narratives; the names of cities like Haran, Nahur, Terah, Peleg, and Serug mentioned in Genesis; the movement of people throughout the area in the late 18th century BCE; and documentation of adoptions of mature adults and wives like Eliezer and Sarah. In more recent times, however, this approach has come to be questioned, as scholars found that many of the stories contain elements (like the Philistines) from long after the time of Abraham; significant differences appear between the ancient texts and the Biblical passages they supposedly explained; and the absence of any reference to Abraham in the writings of Israel's 8th- and 7th-century prophets, who otherwise refer to Sodom and Gomorrah, Jacob and Esau, and the Exodus and Israel's desert wanderings, but do not mention Abraham until the 6th century or later. Seters argued that the Bible says that Abraham migrated from Babylon to Canaan to reflect the Jews' own "migration" from Babylon after having been exiled there in the 6th century. Kugel concluded that most scholars now concede that the Abrahamic stories contain some very ancient material arguably going back to the 10th or 11th century BCE, transmitted orally, and then transformed into the present, prose formulations at a time that remains the subject of debate.

John Bright contrasted Abraham's planting of a sacred tree in Genesis 21:33 with the prohibition of Deuteronomy 16:21. Bright doubted that an author would have portrayed the revered ancestor as performing actions of this kind at a time when his readers would have regarded them as shocking. Bright concluded that the composition of the Jahwist source thus likely predated the Babylonian captivity, as the source so often depicted the Patriarchs as performing actions forbidden in Israelite law by the time of the exile.

Gary Rendsburg noted that Genesis often repeats the motif of the younger son. God favored Abel over Cain in Genesis 4; Isaac superseded Ishmael in Genesis 16–21; Jacob superseded Esau in Genesis 25–27; Judah (fourth among Jacob's sons, last of the original set born to Leah) and Joseph (eleventh in line) superseded their older brothers in Genesis 37–50; Perez superseded Zerah in Genesis 38 and Ruth 4; and Ephraim superseded Manasseh in Genesis 48. Rendsburg explained Genesis's interest with this motif by recalling that David was the youngest of Jesse’s seven sons (see 1 Samuel 16), and Solomon was among the youngest, if not the youngest, of David’s sons (see 2 Samuel 5:13–16). The issue of who among David’s many sons would succeed him dominates the Succession Narrative in 2 Samuel 13 through 1 Kings 2. Amnon was the firstborn but was killed by his brother Absalom (David’s third son) in 2 Samuel 13:29. After Absalom rebelled, David’s general Joab killed him in 2 Samuel 18:14–15. The two remaining candidates were Adonijah (David’s fourth son) and Solomon, and although Adonijah was older (and once claimed the throne when David was old and feeble in 1 Kings 1), Solomon won out. Rendsburg argued that even though firstborn royal succession was the norm in the ancient Near East, the authors of Genesis justified Solomonic rule by imbedding the notion of ultimogeniture into Genesis’s national epic. An Israelite could thus not criticize David’s selection of Solomon to succeed him as king over Israel, because Genesis reported that God had favored younger sons since Abel and blessed younger sons of Israel—Isaac, Jacob, Judah, Joseph, Perez, and Ephraim—since the inception of the covenant. More generally, Rendsburg concluded that royal scribes living in Jerusalem during the reigns of David and Solomon in the tenth century BCE were responsible for Genesis; their ultimate goal was to justify the monarchy in general, and the kingship of David and Solomon in particular; and Genesis thus appears as a piece of political propaganda.

=== Genesis chapter 18 ===
Reading Abraham’s question to God in Genesis 18:25, "Shall the Judge (שֹׁפֵט, shofet) of all the earth not do justice (מִשְׁפָּט, mishpat)?" Michael Carasik argued that the common root of the two words “Judge (שֹׁפֵט, shofet)” and “justice (מִשְׁפָּט, mishpat)” makes Abraham's question all the more pointed.

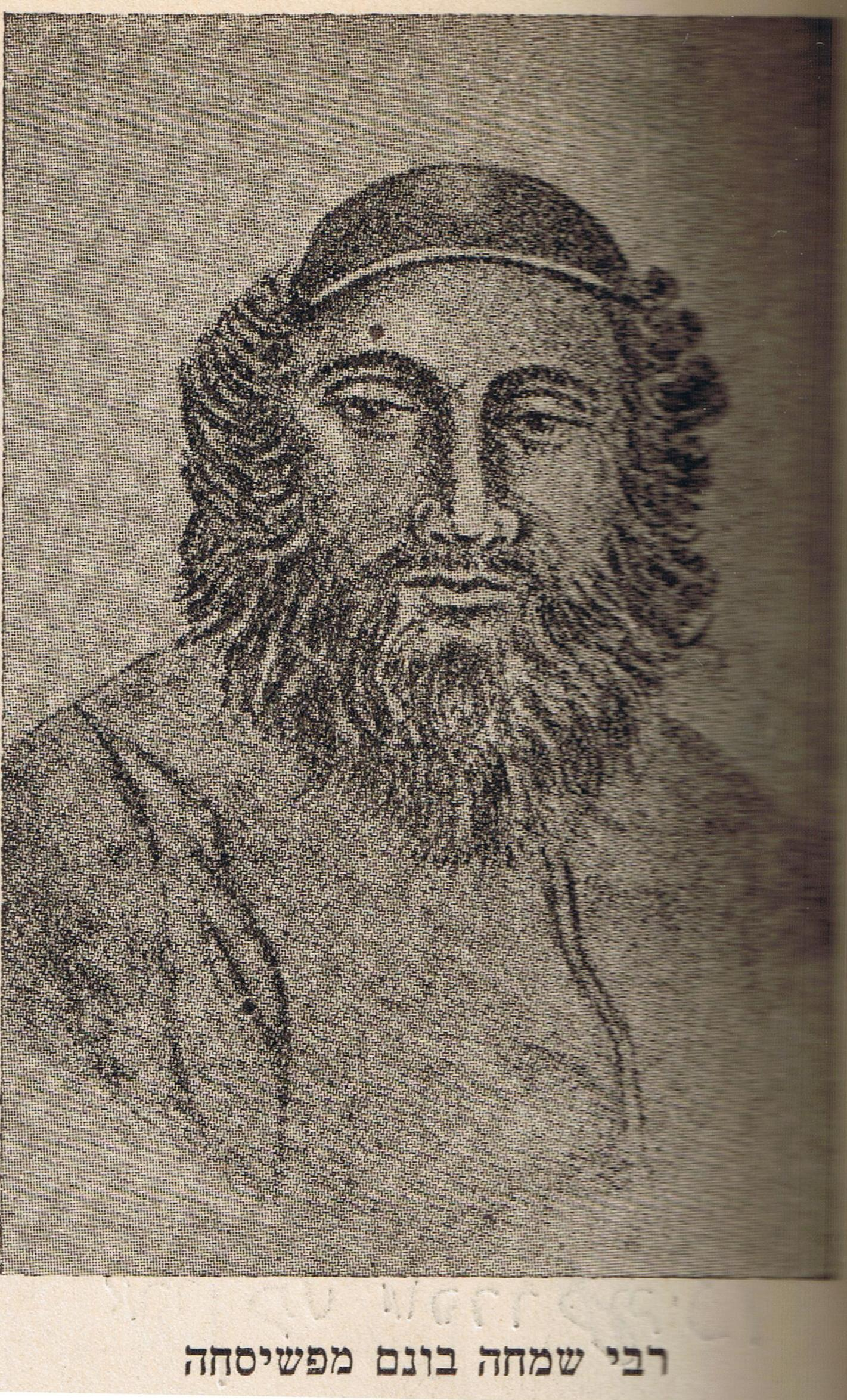
Simcha Bunim

Martin Buber wrote that Simcha Bunim of Peshischa taught that everyone should carry two pieces of paper, one in each pocket. On one should be written, "For my sake was the world created," while on the other should be written (as Abraham said in Genesis 18:27), "I am only dust and ashes." And one should look at one piece of paper or the other as the moment requires.

Gordon Wenham identified the following chiastic structure in the story of Sodom:

A—Abraham's visitors look toward Sodom (18:16)

B—Divine reflections on Abraham and Sodom (18:17–21)

C—Abraham pleads for Sodom (18:22–33)

D—Angels arrive in Sodom (19:1–3)

E—Assault on Lot and his visitors (19:4–11)

F—Destruction of Sodom announced (19:12–13)

E^{1}—Lot's sons-in-law reject his appeal (19:14)

D^{1}—Departure from Sodom (19:15–16)

C^{1}—Lot pleads for Zoar (19:17–22)

B^{1}—Sodom and Gomorrah destroyed (19:23–26)

A^{1}—Abraham looks toward Sodom (19:27–28)

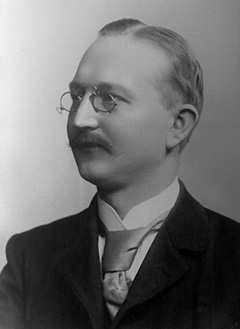
Gunkel

=== Genesis chapter 19 ===
To Hermann Gunkel, the expression "even to this day" in Genesis 19:38 revealed that a great interval of time lay between the period of the Patriarchs and that of the narrators of Genesis.

Rendsburg read in Genesis 19:30–38—which portrays the nations of Moab and Ammon, Transjordanian states ruled by David and Solomon, as descendants of the sons of Lot (and thus the grandnephews of Abraham)—to indicate that the author of Genesis sought to portray the ancestors of these countries as related to the patriarchs in order to justify Israelite rule over them. Rendsburg noted that during the United Monarchy, Israel governed the most firmly the nations geographically closest to Israel; 2 Samuel reports that Israel held the native kings of Moab and Ammon to rule as tributary vassals.

=== Genesis chapter 20 ===
Reading the three instances of the wife-sister motif in (a) Genesis 12:10–20; (b) Genesis 20:1–18; and (c) Genesis 26:6–11, Ephraim Speiser argued that in a work by a single author, these three cases would present serious contradictions: Abraham would have learned nothing from his narrow escape in Egypt, and so tried the same ruse in Gerar; and Abimelech would have been so little sobered by his perilous experience with Abraham and Sarah that he fell into the identical trap with Isaac and Rebekah. Speiser concluded (on independent grounds) that the Jahwist was responsible for incidents (a) and (c), while the Elohist was responsible for incident (b). If the Elohist had been merely an annotator of the Jahwist, however, the Elohist would still have seen the contradictions for Abimelech, a man of whom the Elohist clearly approved. Speiser concluded that the Jahwist and the Elohist therefore must have worked independently. Speiser read the account of Abraham and Abimelech in Genesis 20 as an example of the Elohist's tendency to justify and explain rather than let actions speak for themselves.

=== Genesis chapter 21 ===
Rendsburg noted that in chapter 21, Ishmael is never referred to by name, thus indicating that Ishmael was leaving the scene of the narrative.

Genesis 21:31 describes the founding of Beersheba, but Glenn Holland noted that the city did not exist before the Kingdom of Saul, around the first millennium BCE.

Gunkel suggested that once in ancient times, there were conflicts between the citizens of Gerar and the neighboring Bedouins over wells, ending in a compromise at Beersheba, and Genesis 21 and 26 depict these affairs as a war and a treaty between Abimelech, king of Gerar, and Abraham or Isaac.

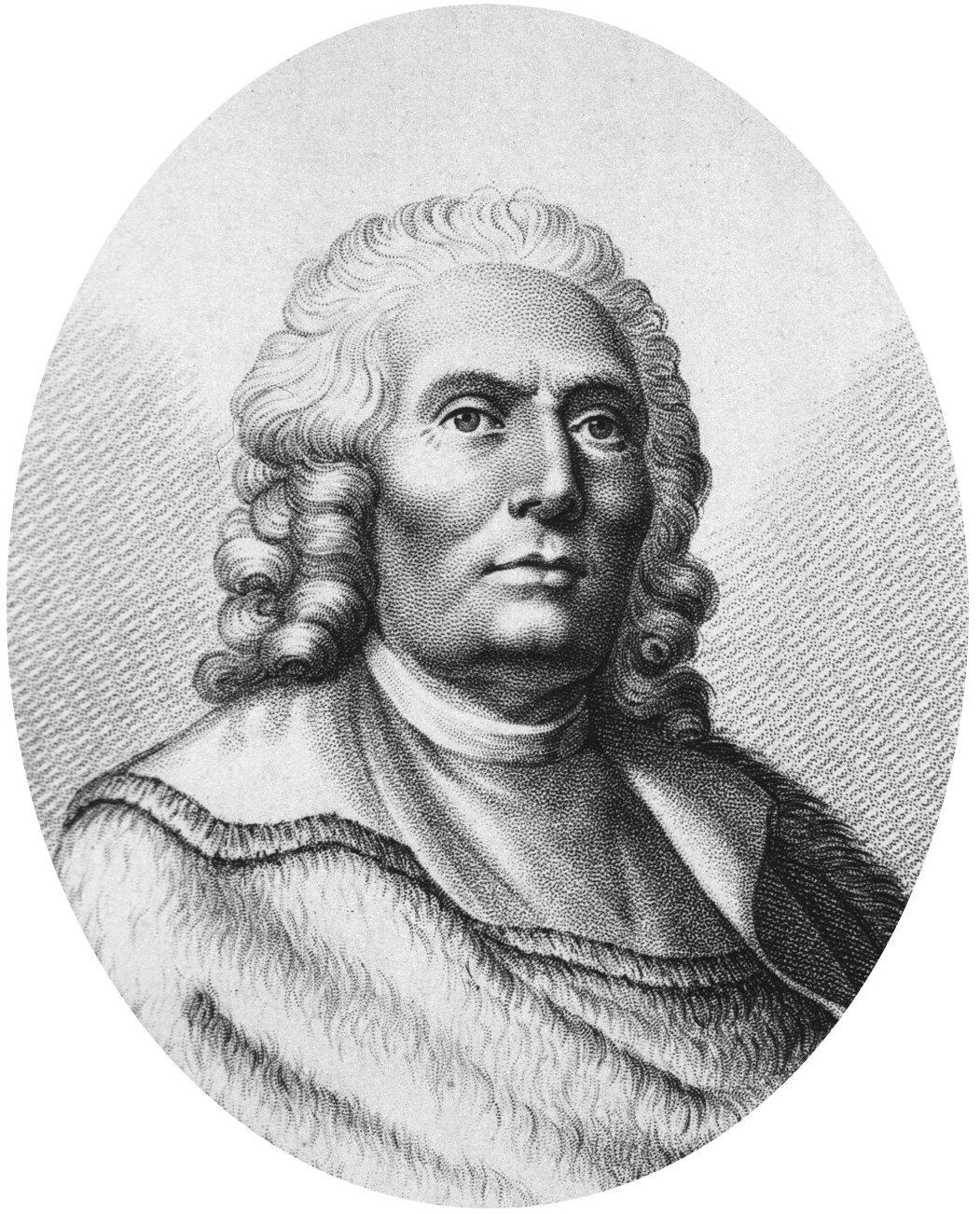
Astruc

=== Genesis chapter 22 ===
Jean Astruc, one of the founding fathers of the Documentary Hypothesis, saw in the narrative of the Binding of Isaac a Document A—Genesis 22:1–10—and a Document B—Genesis 22:11–19.

Rendsburg explained the words of Genesis 22:1, "God put Abraham to the test," as a literary device to deflect attention from Isaac and focus on Abraham.

Rendsburg saw the author of Genesis demonstrating the significance of Jerusalem in Genesis 22:14, which refers to the site of the binding of Isaac as “the mount of the Lord.” Rendsburg noted that whenever the Bible uses this phrase elsewhere, in Isaiah 2:3, 30:29; Micah 4:2; Zechariah 8:3; and Psalms 24:3, it refers to Jerusalem. Rendsburg also noted that Genesis 22 contains a concentration of key words that begin with the consonants yod (י, y) and resh (ר, r), the letters that begin the word “Jerusalem” (יְרוּשָׁלַיִם, Yerushalayim). Most prominent are the phrases אֱלֹהִים יִרְאֶה, Elohim yir’eh (“God will see”) in Genesis 22:8; יְהוָה יִרְאֶה, Adonai yir’eh (the name of the place) and יְהוָה יֵרָאֶה, YHVH yir’eh (“YHVH is seen”) in Genesis 22:14; and בְּהַר יְהוָה יֵרָאֶה, behar YHVH yir’eh, (“on the mount of the Lord there is vision”) in Genesis 22:14; all of which evoke the name Jerusalem. Rendsburg noted further that Genesis 22:3 refers to "the land of Moriah", and this word occurs in the Bible in only one other place, 2 Chronicles 3:1: "Solomon began to build the Temple of YHVH in Jerusalem on Mount Moriah, which appeared to David his father, and which David had prepared as the place, at the threshing floor of Ornan (a variant of Araunah) the Jebusite." This passage indicates that by the Persian period, Jewish readers had identified Moriah with Jerusalem. Rendsburg further noted that although Abraham built altars at Shechem in Genesis 12:6–7 and between Bethel and Ai in Genesis 12:8, only in Genesis 22 does the text report Abraham actually making a sacrifice—the ram that he found caught in the thicket that he sacrificed in liew of Isaac. Rendsburg argued that the message would have been clear to Israelites living in Solomon's time that even though altars stood throughout the countryside, and some may even have been as old as Abraham, the only place where Abraham actually sacrificed was the mount of the Lord—Jerusalem—and that was why only the Jerusalem Temple was approved for sacrifices to God.

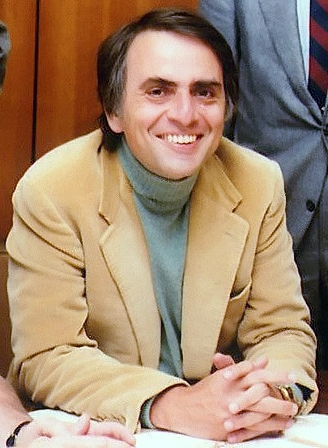
Sagan

In Genesis 22:17, God promised that the Abraham's descendants would as numerous as the stars of heaven and the sands on the seashore. Carl Sagan reported that there are more stars in the universe than sands on all the beaches on the Earth.

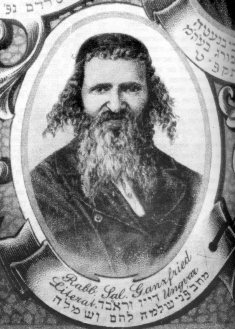
Shlomo Ganzfried, editor of the Kitzur Shulchan Aruch

== Commandments ==
According to Maimonides and Sefer ha-Chinuch, there are no commandments in the parashah.

As the sages read Genesis 18:1, "And the Lord appeared to him [Abraham] by the terebinths of Mamre" (when Abraham was still recovering from his circumcision in Genesis 17:26) to report that God visited Abraham when Abraham was ill, the Kitzur Shulchan Aruch teaches that everyone is obligated to visit a person who becomes ill.

== In the liturgy ==
Some Jews refer to the ten trials of Abraham in Genesis 12–25 as they study chapter 5 of Pirkei Avot on a Sabbath between Passover and Rosh Hashanah.

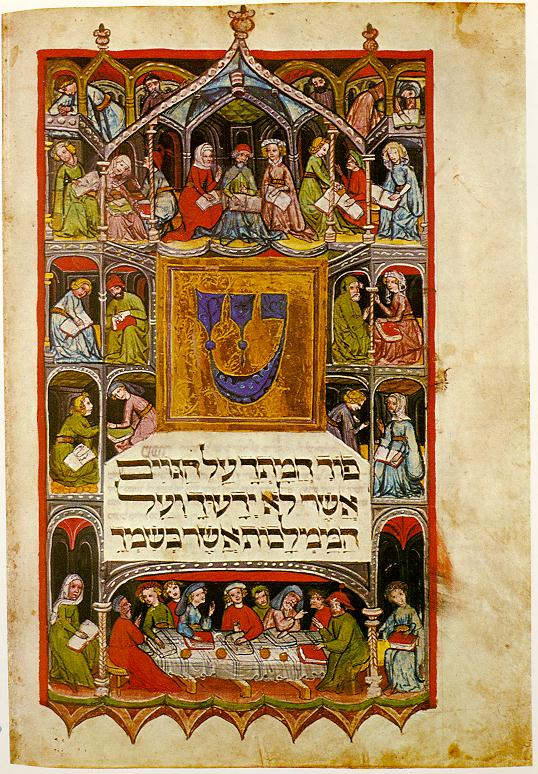
A page from a 14th-century German Haggadah

The Passover Haggadah, in the concluding nirtzah section of the Seder, in a reference to Abraham's visitors in Genesis 18:1, recounts how God knocked on Abraham's door in the heat of the day on Passover and Abraham fed his visitors matzah cakes, deducing the season from the report in Genesis 19:3 that Lot fed his visitors matzah. The Haggadah recounts that Abraham ran to the herd. The Haggadah continues that it was thus on Passover that the Sodomites were consumed by God's fire, as reported in Genesis 19:24–25.

Also, in the nirtzah section of the seder, in a reference to Genesis 20:3 or 20:6, the Haggadah recounts how God judged the King of Gerar Abimelech in the middle of the night.

Genesis 21 is the Torah reading for the first day of Rosh Hashanah, and the traditional Rosh Hashanah prayerbook (מחזור, machzor) includes a liturgical poem (פִּיּוּט, piyyut) attributed to Rabbi Eleazar ben Kalir based on Genesis 21:1 noting that God remembered Sarah on Rosh Hashanah. In its responsum supporting the inclusion of the Matriarchs in the first blessing of the Amidah (עמידה) prayer, the Committee on Jewish Law and Standards of Conservative Judaism cited the Rosh Hashanah Torah reading for the proposition that the liturgy had already recognized the Matriarch’s role in the covenant between God and Jews.

The Rabbis understood Abraham's devotion to God in the binding of Isaac in Genesis 22:1–19 to have earned God's mercy for Abraham's descendants when they are in need. The 16th century Safed Rabbi Eliezer Azikri drew on this rabbinic understanding to call for God to show mercy for Abraham's descendants, "the son of Your beloved" (ben ohavach), in his kabbalistic poem Yedid Nefesh ("Soul's Beloved"), which many congregations chant just before the Kabbalat Shabbat prayer service.

Many Jews, following Kabbalistic masters from the Zohar to Arizal, recite Genesis 22:1–19, the binding of Isaac, after the morning blessings (Birkat HaShachar). The recitation of Abraham's and Isaac's willingness to put God above life itself is meant to invoke God's mercy, to inspire worshipers to greater love of God, and to bring atonement to the penitent.

And many Jews recall God's answering Abraham on Mount Moriah and God's answering his son Isaac when he was bound on top of the altar (as reported in Genesis 22:11–18) as they recite some of the final piyutim that they say each day in penitential Selichot prayers leading up to the High Holy Days.

== Haftarah ==
A haftarah is a text selected from the books of Nevi'im ("The Prophets") that is read publicly in the synagogue after the reading of the Torah on Sabbath and holiday mornings. The haftarah usually has a thematic link to the Torah reading that precedes it.

The specific text read following Parashah Vayeira varies according to different traditions within Judaism. Examples are:

- for Ashkenazi Jews: 2 Kings 4:1-37
- for Sephardi Jews: 2 Kings 4:1-23
- for Karaite Jews: Isaiah 33:17–35:10

The parashah and haftarah in 2 Kings both tell of God's gift of sons to childless women. In both the parashah and the haftarah: God's representative visits the childless woman, whose household extends the visitor generous hospitality; the husband's age raises doubt about the couple's ability to have children; God's representative announces that a child will come at a specified season in the next year; the woman conceives and bears a child as God's representative had announced; death threatens the promised child; and God's representative intervenes to save the promised child.

== See also ==
- Binding of Isaac
- Hājar
- Wife–sister narratives in the Book of Genesis
