= Azrieli =

Azrieli may refer to:

Surname

- David Azrieli, CM CQ (1922–2014), Canadian real estate tycoon, developer, designer, architect and philanthropist
- Sharon Azrieli, soprano singer and cantor from Montreal, Quebec

Business

- Azrieli Group, Israeli real estate and holding company

Buildings

- Azrieli Center, a complex of skyscrapers in Tel Aviv, Israel
- Azrieli Sarona Tower, skyscraper in the Sarona neighborhood, Tel Aviv, Israel

Education

- Azrieli College of Engineering Jerusalem, an Israeli public academic college
- Azrieli Graduate School of Jewish Education and Administration, graduate school part of Yeshiva University

== See also ==
- Asrael
- Asriel
- Azrael
- Azri'el
- Azriel (disambiguation)
