= Manasseh (tribal patriarch) =

First son of Joseph in the Bible

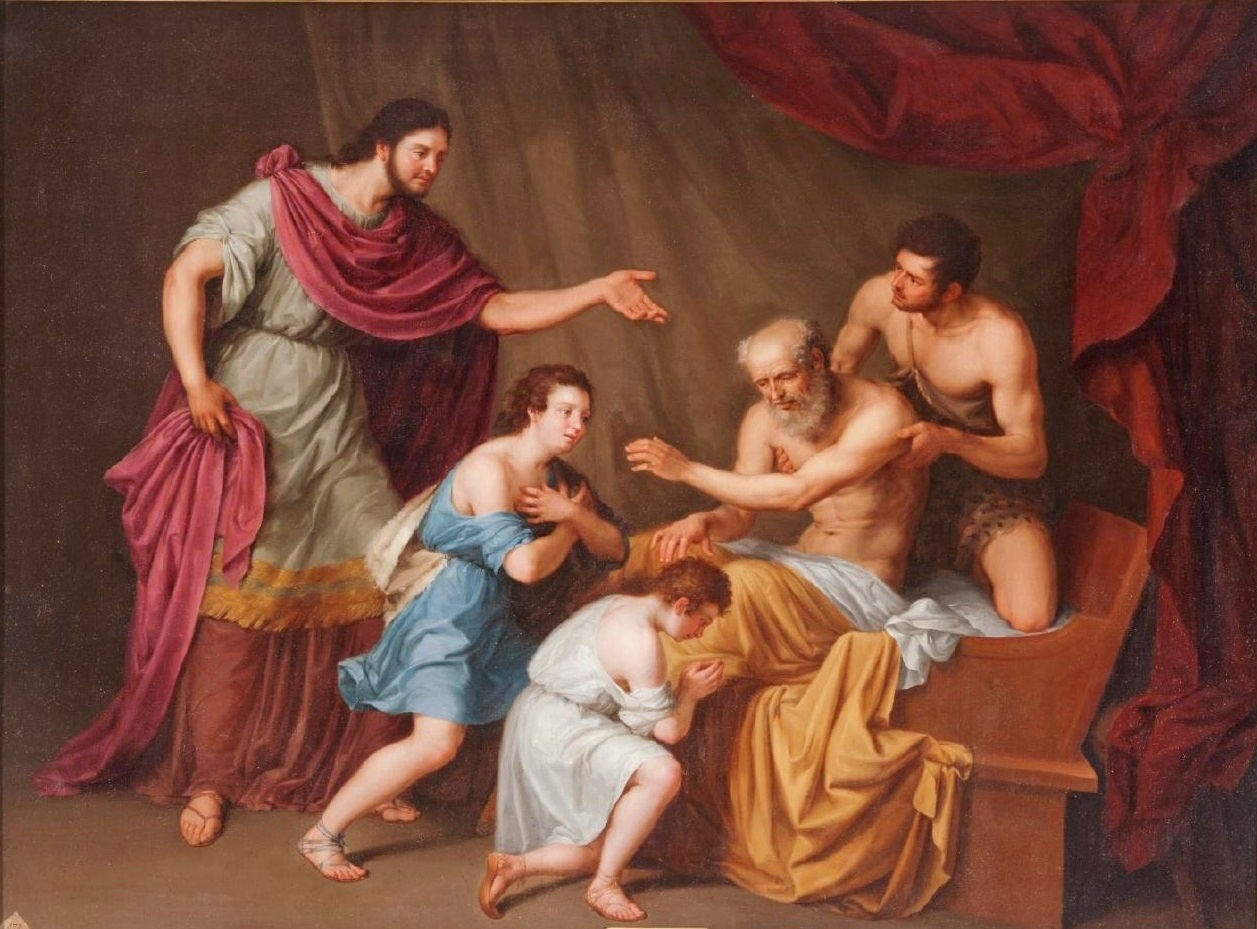
- Jacob blessing Ephraim and Manasseh by Antonio María Esquivel

Righteous
- Honored in: Eastern Orthodox Church; Roman Catholic Church
- Feast: 3 November; 19 December

Manasseh (/məˈnæsə/) or Menashe (Hebrew: מְנַשֶּׁה, Modern: Mənašše, Tiberian: Mănašše) was, according to the Book of Genesis, the first son of Joseph and Asenath (Genesis 41:50–52). Asenath was an Egyptian woman whom the Pharaoh gave to Joseph as wife, and the daughter of Potipherah, a priest of On (Genesis 41:50–52). Manasseh was born in Egypt before the arrival of the children of Israel from Canaan (Genesis 48:5).

== Biblical narrative ==
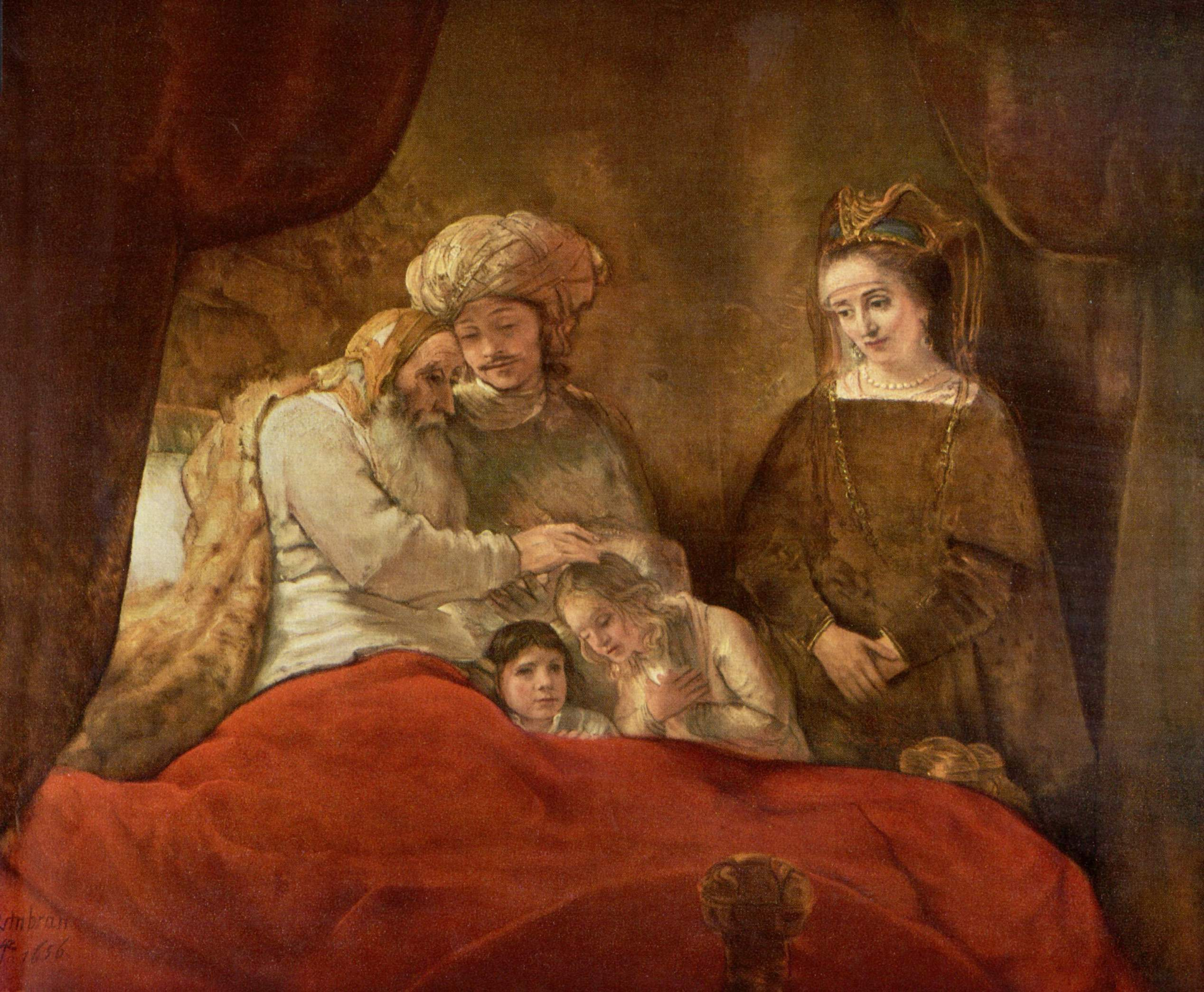
Jacob Blessing the Sons of Joseph by Rembrandt, 1656. Genesis 48 describes how Jacob blessed Ephraim and Manasseh.

According to the Biblical account in Genesis 41:51, the name Manasseh, the name Joseph gives one of his sons, means "God has made me forget".

Jacob (Joseph's father) adopted Joseph's two sons, Manasseh and Ephraim, so the boys might share in Jacob's inheritance equally with Jacob's own sons (Genesis 48:5). Manasseh is counted as the father of the Israelite Tribe of Manasseh, one of the Twelve Tribes of Israel. Jacob also blessed Ephraim over his older brother (Genesis 48:20).

Manasseh had a son, Asriel, with his wife, and Machir with his Aramean concubine (1 Chronicles 7:14). Numbers 32:41 and Deuteronomy 3:14 refer to a son called Jair, who "took all the region of Argob, as far as the border of the Geshurites and the Maachathites, and [who] called Bashan after his own name, Havoth-Jair.

== Biblical criticism ==
In the Biblical account, Joseph's other son is Ephraim, and Joseph himself is one of the two children of Rachel and Jacob (the other being Benjamin). Biblical scholars regard it as obvious, from their geographic overlap and their treatment in older passages, that originally Manasseh and Ephraim were considered one tribe—that of Joseph. Furthermore, Benjamin may have originally been meant to be part of this same tribe, but the Biblical account of Joseph as his father became lost. It is suspected that the distinction of the Joseph tribes (including Benjamin) is that they were the only Israelites who went to Egypt and returned, while the other Israelite tribes emerged as a subculture from the Canaanites and had remained in Canaan throughout. According to this view, the story of Jacob's visit to Laban to obtain a wife originated as a metaphor for this migration, with the property and family gained from Laban representing the gains of the Joseph tribes by the time they returned from Egypt. The Jahwist version of the Laban narrative only mentions the Joseph tribes and Rachel, and does not mention the other tribal matriarchs at all.

The Book of Chronicles states that Manasseh was married to an Aramean concubine and that they had two sons: Asriel and Machir. In the Torah's genealogy of Manasseh's family, which textual scholars ascribe to the earlier priestly source, Asriel instead appears to be the son of Gilead, the son of Machir. Near the end of the book of Genesis, in some English translations of the Bible (e.g., the King James Version), Manasseh's grandchildren are described as having been "brought up upon Joseph's knees". In contrast, other English translations (e.g., the Revised Version) render the same text as "born upon Joseph's knees". The gloss for the passage given by the New International Version is that Joseph adopted the grandchildren as his own children at the moment they were born.

== Rabbinical interpretations ==
In the Torah, the eventual precedence of the tribe of Ephraim is argued to derive from Joseph tricking Jacob, blind and on his deathbed, into blessing Ephraim before Manasseh. The text describing this blessing features a hapax legomenon: the Biblical Hebrew word שכל (sh-k-l), which Rabbinic literature interpreted esoterically; Some Rabbinic sources connect the term with sekhel (Hebrew: שֵׂכֶל, 'intellect' or 'wit') and view it as indicating that Jacob was entirely aware of who he was actually blessing. Other sources connect the term with shikkel, viewing it as signifying that Jacob was actually despoiling Manasseh in favour of Ephraim. It was also argued that it refers to the power of Jacob to instruct and guide the Holy Spirit.

The Targum Pseudo-Jonathan argues that Manasseh had been a steward in Joseph's household, had acted as an interpreter between Joseph and his other brothers and that Manasseh had unusually great strength.

== Herbert Armstrong ==
Author Herbert W. Armstrong of the Worldwide Church of God (1933 to 1986), in a book called The United States and Great Britain in Prophecy, claimed the United States of America was primarily descended from the Tribe of Manasseh after Assyrian captivity and subsequent migrations. The Living Church of God, an offshoot of the Worldwide Church of God, ties these migrations to the spread of the Y-chromosome DNA haplogroup R-M269, based on a 2015 study.

British Israelite theories are uniformly rejected by mainstream modern scholarship. Despite the absence of any credible evidence these theories still garner support from some fundamentalist Christians, e.g., the Philadelphia Church of God.

== Veneration ==
As Manasses, he is venerated in the Catholic Church as a saint, whose feast day is 3 November or 19 December.

== See also ==
- Ephraim
- Tribe of Ephraim
- Tribe of Manasseh
