= Miketz =

10th portion in the annual Jewish cycle of weekly Torah reading

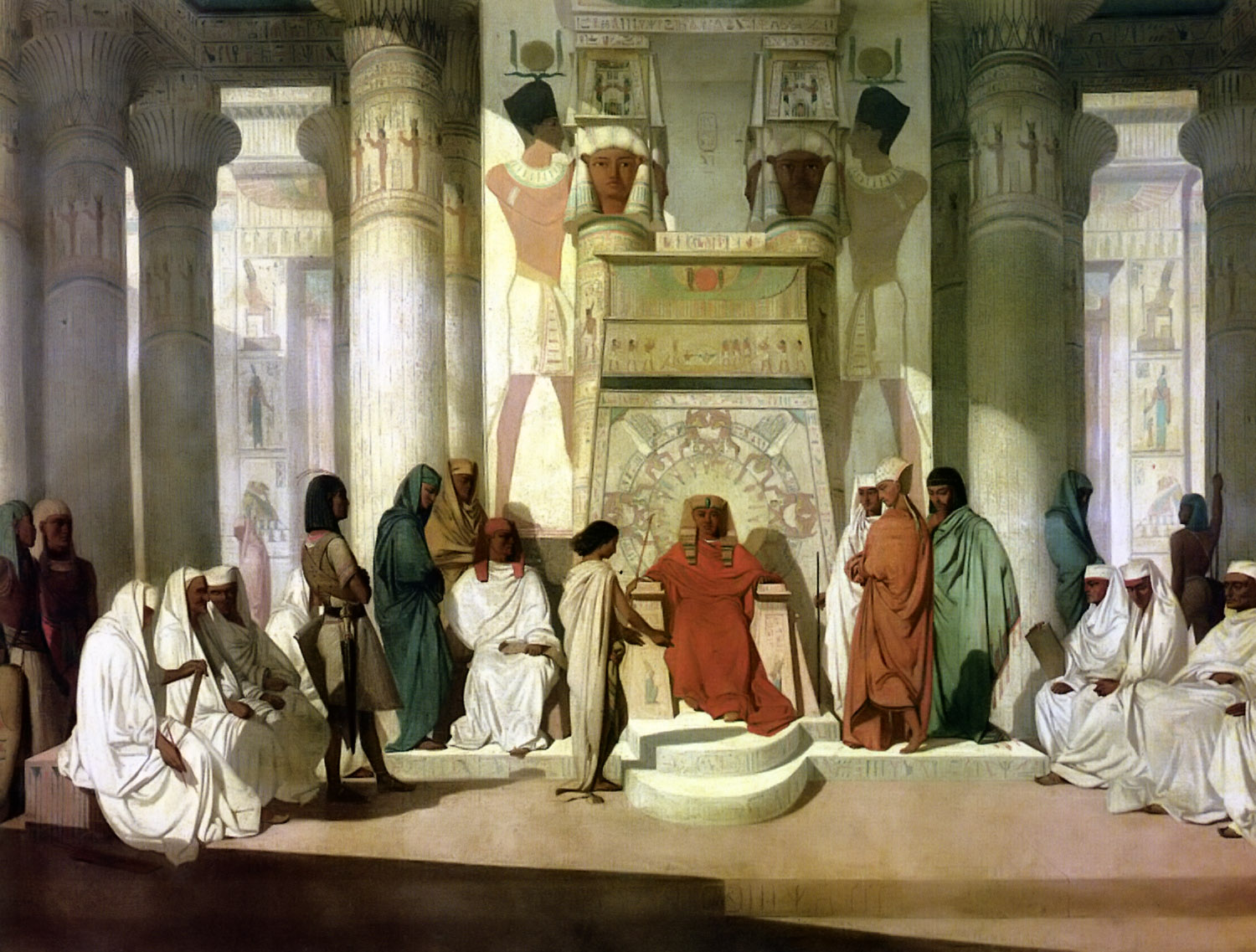
Joseph Interprets the Dream of Pharaoh (19th Century painting by Jean-Adrien Guignet)

Miketz or Mikeitz (מִקֵּץ—Hebrew for "at the end," the second word and first distinctive word of the parashah) is the tenth weekly Torah portion (פָּרָשָׁה, parashah) in the annual Jewish cycle of Torah reading. It constitutes Genesis 41:1–44:17. The parashah tells of Joseph's interpretation of Pharaoh's dreams, Joseph's rise to power in Egypt, and Joseph's testing of his brothers.

The parashah has the most letters (although not the most words or verses) of any of the weekly Torah portions in the Book of Genesis. It is made up of 7,914 Hebrew letters, 2,022 Hebrew words, 146 verses, and 255 lines in a Torah Scroll (סֵפֶר תּוֹרָה, Sefer Torah). (In the Book of Genesis, Parashat Vayeira has the most words, and Parashiyot Noach and Vayishlach have the most verses.) Jews read Parashat Miketz on the tenth Sabbath after Simchat Torah, generally in December, or rarely in late November or early January, usually during Chanukah.

== Readings ==
In traditional Sabbath Torah reading, the parashah is divided into seven readings, or עליות, aliyot. In the Masoretic Text of the Tanakh (Hebrew Bible), Parashat Miketz has no "open portion" (פתוחה, petuchah) divisions (roughly equivalent to paragraphs, often abbreviated with the Hebrew letter פ (peh)). Parashat Miketz has a single "closed portion" (סתומה, setumah) division (abbreviated with the Hebrew letter ס (samekh)) at the close of the parashah. Thus, the Masoretic Text treats the parashah as one continuous whole.

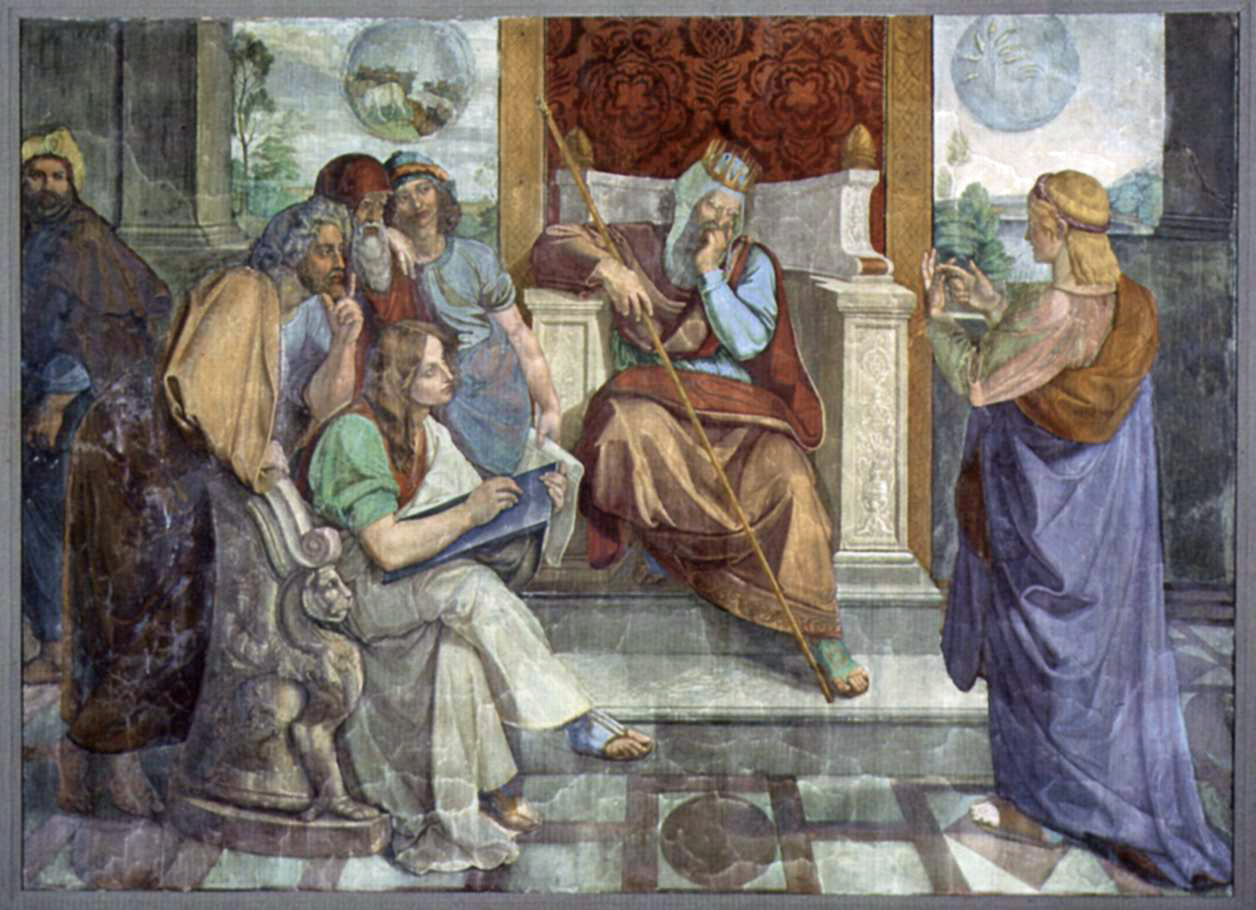
Joseph Interprets Pharaoh's Dream (fresco circa 1816–1817 by Peter von Cornelius)

=== First reading—Genesis 41:1–14 ===
In the first reading, Pharaoh dreamed that he stood by the river, and out came seven fat cattle, who fed in the reed-grass. And then seven lean cattle came up out of the river and ate the seven fat cattle, and Pharaoh awoke. He went back to sleep and dreamed that seven good ears of corn came up on one stalk, and then seven thin ears sprung up after them and swallowed the good ears, and Pharaoh again awoke. In the morning, Pharaoh was troubled and sent for all the magicians and wise men of Egypt and told them his dream, but none could interpret it. Then the chief butler spoke up, confessing his faults and relating how Pharaoh had put him in prison with the baker, and a Hebrew there had interpreted their dreams, correctly predicting the future. Pharaoh sent for Joseph, who shaved, changed clothes, and came to Pharaoh. The first reading ends here.

=== Second reading—Genesis 41:15–38 ===
In the second reading, Pharaoh told Joseph that he had had a dream that none could interpret and had heard that Joseph could interpret dreams, but Joseph said that God would give Pharaoh an answer. Pharaoh told Joseph his dreams, and Joseph told him that the two dreams were one, a prediction of what God was about to do. The seven good cattle and the seven good ears symbolized seven years of plenty, and the seven lean cattle and the seven empty ears symbolized seven years of famine that would consume thereafter. The dream was doubled because God had established the thing and would shortly bring it to pass. Joseph recommended that Pharaoh set over Egypt a man discreet and wise, that he appoint overseers to take up a fifth of the harvests during the years of plenty, and that he store that food for the years of famine. Pharaoh agreed, asking whether anyone could find a man such as Joseph in whom the spirit of God was. The second reading ends here.

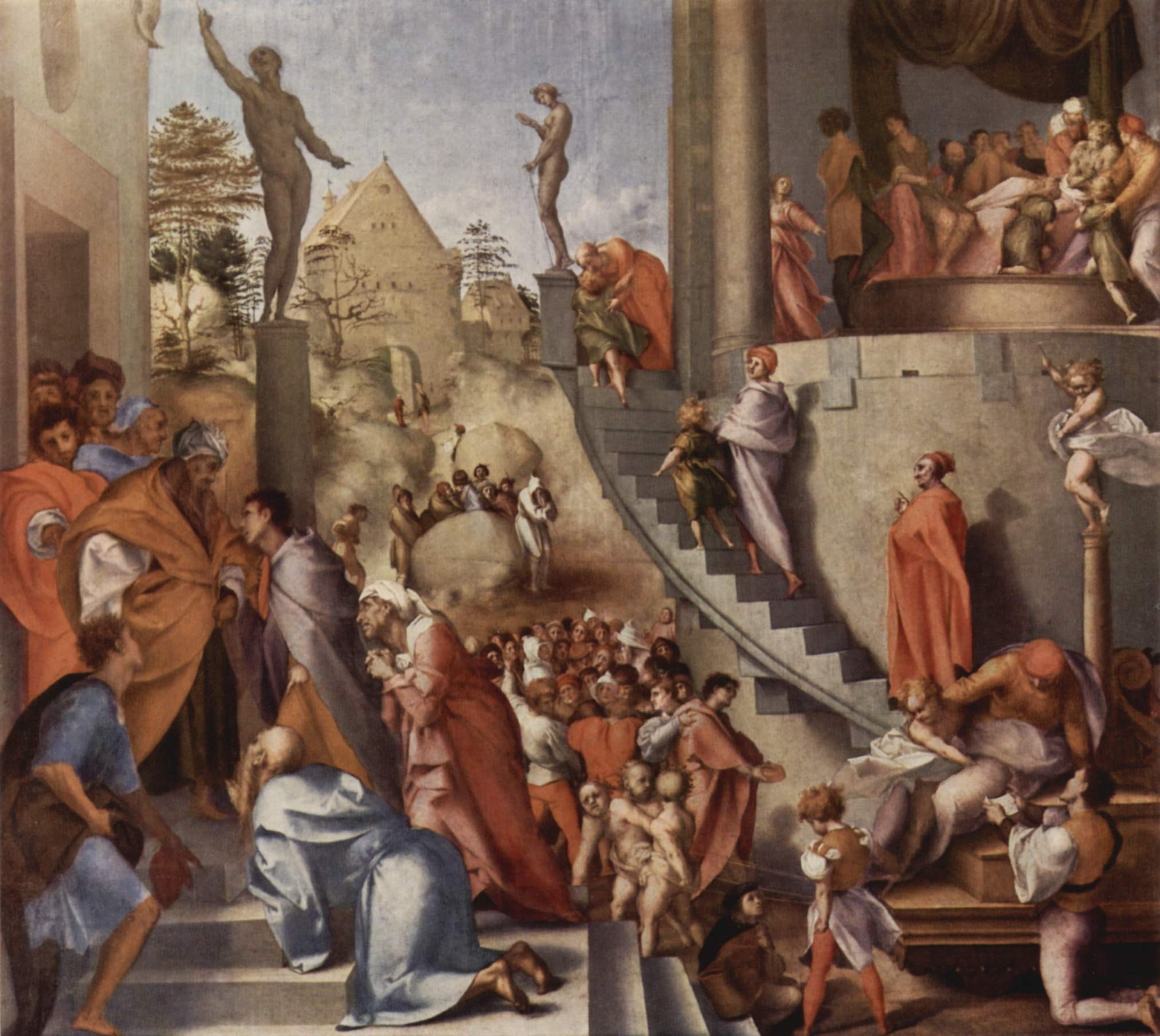
Joseph in Egypt (painting circa 1517–1518 by Pontormo)

=== Third reading—Genesis 41:39–52 ===
In the third reading, Pharaoh told Joseph that in as much as God had shown him all this, there was none so discreet and wise as Joseph, and thus Pharaoh set Joseph over all the land of Egypt. Pharaoh gave Joseph his signet ring, fine linen, a gold chain about his neck, and his 2nd chariot, and had people cry "Abrech" before him. And Pharaoh renamed Joseph Zaphenath-paneah and gave him Asenath the daughter of Potipherah priest of On to be his wife. Joseph was 30 years old when he stood before Pharaoh, and in the seven years of plenty he gathered up grain as plentiful as the sand of the sea. Joseph and Asenath had two sons, the first of whom Joseph called Manasseh, for God had made him forget all his toil and all his father's house, and the second of whom he called Ephraim, for God had made him fruitful in the land of his affliction. The third reading ends here.

=== Fourth reading—Genesis 41:53–42:18 ===
In the fourth reading, the seven years of plenty ended and famine struck, and when Egypt was famished, Joseph opened the storehouses and sold food to the Egyptians. People from all countries came to Egypt to buy grain, because the famine struck all the earth. Jacob saw that there was grain in Egypt, asked his sons why they sat around looking at each other, and sent them down to Egypt to buy some. Ten of Joseph's brothers went down to Egypt, but Jacob kept Benjamin behind, so that no harm would befall him. Joseph's brothers came to buy grain from Joseph and bowed down to him with their faces to the earth. Joseph recognized his brothers, but they did not recognize him, for he made himself strange to them and spoke roughly with them. Joseph remembered his dreams, and accused them of being spies. But they protested that they were not spies, but upright men come to buy food, ten sons of a man who had twelve sons, lost one, and kept one behind. Joseph told them that to prove their story, they would have to send one of them to fetch their brother, and he imprisoned them for three days. On the third day, Joseph proposed a plan to them, because he feared God. The fourth reading ends here.

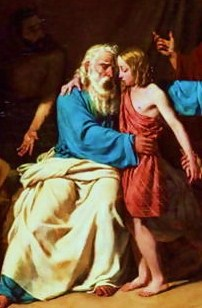
Jacob Refusing To Let Benjamin Go to Egypt (1829 painting by Adolphe Rogers)

=== Fifth reading—Genesis 42:19–43:15 ===
In the long fifth reading, Joseph told his brothers that he would allow them to prove themselves by letting one of them be bound in prison while the others carried grain to their houses and brought their youngest brother to Egypt. They said to one another that surely they were guilty concerning their brother, and so now this distress had come upon them. Reuben said that he had told them not to sin against their brother, but they had not listened. They did not realize that Joseph understood them, for he used an interpreter, and Joseph turned aside and wept. When Joseph returned, he bound Simeon before their eyes, and commanded that their vessels be filled with grain and that their money be restored to their sacks. They loaded their donkeys and departed. When they came to a lodging-place, one of them opened his sack and found his money, and their spirits fell, wondering what God had done to them. They went home and told Jacob what had happened, and Jacob accused them of bereaving him of his children, first Joseph and now Simeon, and told them that they would not take Benjamin away. Reuben answered that Jacob could kill Reuben's two sons if Reuben failed to bring Benjamin back, but Jacob insisted that his son would not go down with them, for Joseph was dead and only Benjamin was left, and if harm befell Benjamin then it would be the death of Jacob. The famine continued, and Jacob told the brothers to buy more grain. Judah reminded Jacob that the man had warned them that they could not see his face unless their brother came with them, so if Jacob sent their brother Benjamin they could buy food, but if Jacob did not send him they could not go. Jacob asked them why they had treated him so ill as to tell the man that they had a brother. They explained that the man asked them directly about their family, whether their father was alive, and whether they had another brother, and they answered him; how were they to know that he would ask them to bring their brother? Judah then asked Jacob to send the lad with him, so that they could go and the family could live, and Judah would serve as surety for him, for they could have been to Egypt and back if they had not lingered. Relenting, Jacob directed them to take a present for the man, double money in case the return of their payment was an oversight, and also their brother, and Jacob prayed that God might show them mercy before the man and that he might release Simeon and Benjamin. So the brothers went to Joseph. The fifth reading ends here.

=== Sixth reading—Genesis 43:16–29 ===
In the sixth reading, when Joseph saw Benjamin with them, he directed his steward to bring the men into the house and prepare a meal for him to eat with them at noon. When the brothers were conducted into Joseph's house, they grew afraid that Joseph was going to hold them as bondmen because they had taken the money that they found in their sacks. So they explained to Joseph's steward how they had discovered their money returned to them and had brought it back with them, plus more money to buy grain. But the steward told them not to fear, for their God had given them treasure in their sacks; he had their money. The steward brought Simeon out, brought them into Joseph's house, gave them water, and fed their donkeys. When Joseph came home, they brought their present and bowed down to him. Joseph asked about their and of their father's welfare. They said that Joseph's servant their father was well, and they bowed their heads. Joseph looked upon Benjamin and asked them whether this was their youngest brother of whom they had spoken, and he prayed that God would be gracious to Benjamin. The sixth reading ends here.

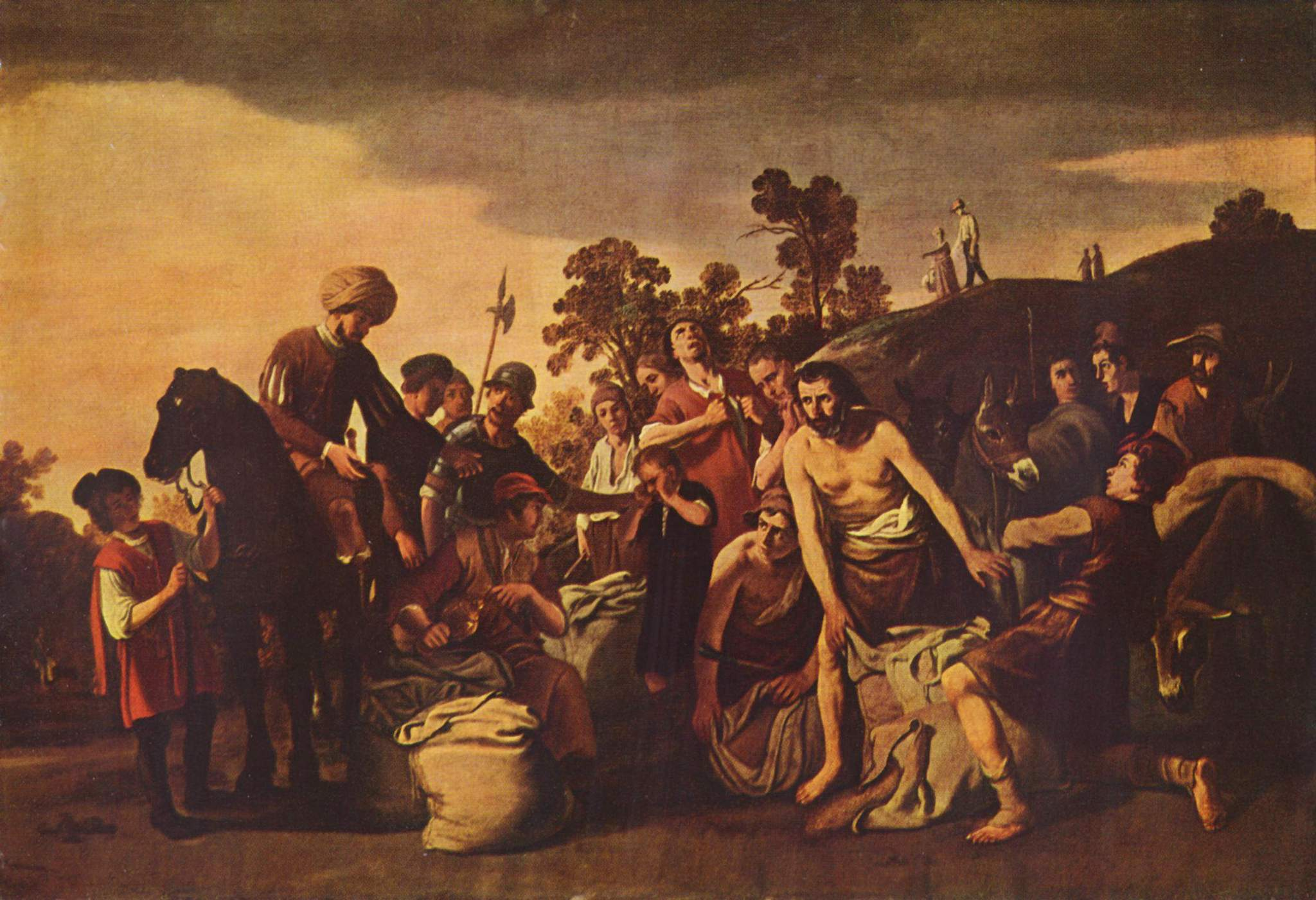
Joseph's Steward Finds the Cup in Benjamin's Sack (1627 painting by Claes Corneliszoon Moeyaert)

=== Seventh reading—Genesis 43:30–44:17 ===
In the seventh reading, Joseph left hastily for his chamber and wept, washed his face, returned, and called for the servants to serve the meal. Joseph sat by himself, the brothers sat by themselves, and the Egyptians sat by themselves, because it was an abomination to the Egyptians to eat with the Hebrews. The brothers marveled that the servants had seated them according to their age. And Benjamin's portion was five times so much as any of his brothers'. Joseph directed the steward to fill the men's sacks with as much food as they could carry, put every man's money in his sack, and put Joseph's silver goblet in the youngest one's sack. At dawn, the brothers were sent away, but when they had not yet gone far from the city, Joseph directed his steward to overtake them and ask them why they had rewarded evil for good and taken the goblet with which Joseph drank and divined. They asked the steward why he accused them, as they had brought back the money that they had found in their sacks, and they volunteered that the one with whom the goblet was found would die, and the brothers would become bondmen. The steward agreed, with the amendment that the one with whom it was found would be a bondman and the others would go free. Hastily, every man opened his sack, starting with the eldest, and they found the goblet in Benjamin's sack. They rent their clothes, loaded their donkeys, and returned to the city.

In the maftir (מפטיר) reading that concludes the parashah, Judah and his brothers came to Joseph's house and fell before him on the ground. Joseph asked them what they had done, did they not know that a man such as he would divine? Judah asked how they could clear themselves when God had found out their iniquity; they were all Joseph's bondmen. But Joseph insisted that only the man in whose hand the goblet was found would be his bondman, and the others could go in peace to their father. The seventh reading, the single closed portion, and the parashah end here.

=== Readings according to the triennial cycle ===
Jews who read the Torah according to the triennial cycle of Torah reading read the parashah according to the following schedule:

	Year 1	Year 2	Year 3
	2022, 2025, 2028 . . .	2023, 2026, 2029 . . .	2024, 2027, 2030 . . .
Reading	41:1–52	41:53–43:15	43:16–44:17
1	41:1–4	41:53–57	43:16–18
2	41:5–7	42:1–5	43:19–25
3	41:8–14	42:6–18	43:26–29
4	41:15–24	42:19–28	43:30–34
5	41:25–38	42:29–38	44:1–6
6	41:39–43	43:1–7	44:7–10
7	41:44–52	43:8–15	44:11–17
Maftir	41:50–52	43:11–15	44:15–17

== In ancient parallels ==
The parashah has parallels in these ancient sources:

=== Genesis chapter 41 ===
Gerhard von Rad argued that the Joseph narrative is closely related to earlier Egyptian wisdom writings. Von Rad likened Joseph's actions (for example in Genesis 41:14–33) to the admonition of Ptahhotep (an Egyptian vizier during the late 25th and early 24th centuries BCE): "If you are a tried counselor who sits in the hall of his lord, gather your wits together right well. When you are silent, it will be better than tef-tef flowers. When you speak, you must know how to bring the matter to a conclusion. The one who gives counsel is an accomplished man; to speak is harder than any labor."

== In inner-Biblical interpretation ==
The parashah has parallels or is discussed in these Biblical sources:

=== Genesis chapter 41 ===
Von Rad saw affinity between Joseph's actions (for example in Genesis 41:14) and Proverbs 22:29, "See a man diligent in his business? He shall stand before kings; he shall not stand before mean men."

In Genesis 41:15, Pharaoh told Joseph that Pharaoh had heard that Joseph could interpret dreams, and in Genesis 41:16, Joseph replied: "It is not in me; God will give Pharaoh an answer of peace." Similarly, in Daniel 2:26, King Nebuchadnezzar asked Daniel whether Daniel could interpret dreams, and in Daniel 2:27–28, Daniel replied: "The secret which the king has asked can neither wise men, enchanters, magicians, nor astrologers, declare to the king; but there is a God in heaven who reveals secrets, and He has made known to the king Nebuchadnezzar what shall be in the end of days."

=== Genesis chapter 42 ===
In Genesis 44:19–23, Judah retells the events first told in Genesis 42:7–20.

The Narrator in Genesis 42	Judah in Genesis 44
^{7}And Joseph saw his brethren, and he knew them, but made himself strange to them, and spoke roughly with them; and he said to them: "From where do you come?" And they said: "From the land of Canaan to buy food." ^{8}And Joseph knew his brethren, but they did not know him. ^{9}And Joseph remembered the dreams that he dreamed of them, and said to them: "You are spies; to see the nakedness of the land you are come." ^{10}And they said to him: "No, my lord, but to buy food are your servants come. ^{11}We are all one man's sons; we are upright men; your servants are no spies." ^{12}And he said to them: "No, but to see the nakedness of the land you are come."	^{19}My lord asked his servants, saying: "Have you a father, or a brother?"
^{13}And they said: "We your servants are twelve brethren, the sons of one man in the land of Canaan; and, behold, the youngest is this day with our father, and one is not."	^{20}And we said to my lord: "We have a father, an old man, and a child of his old age, a little one; and his brother is dead, and he alone is left of his mother, and his father loves him."
^{14}And Joseph said to them: "That is it that I spoke to you, saying: You are spies. ^{15}Hereby you shall be proved, as Pharaoh lives, you shall not go there, unless your youngest brother comes here. ^{16}Send one of you, and let him fetch your brother, and you shall be bound, that your words may be proved, whether there be truth in you; or else, as Pharaoh lives, surely you are spies." ^{17}And he put them all together into ward three days. ^{18}And Joseph said to them the third day. "This do, and live; for I fear God: ^{19}if you are upright men, let one of your brethren be bound in your prison-house; but go, carry corn for the famine of your houses; ^{20}and bring your youngest brother to me; so shall your words be verified, and you shall not die." And they did so.	^{21}And you said to your servants: "Bring him down to me, that I may set mine eyes upon him." ^{22}And we said to my lord: "The lad cannot leave his father; for if he should leave his father, his father would die." ^{23}And you said to your servants: "Except your youngest brother come down with you, you shall see my face no more."

Von Rad noted that Joseph's words to his brothers in Genesis 42:18, "Do this, and live; for I fear God," echo Proverbs 1:7, "The fear of the Lord is the beginning of knowledge," and Proverbs 15:33, "The fear of the Lord is the instruction of wisdom." Similarly, Von Rad saw Joseph's hiding his emotions in Genesis 42:24 and 43:30 as the embodiment of Proverbs 12:23, "A prudent man conceals knowledge," and Proverbs 10:19, "he who refrains his lips is wise."

== In early nonrabbinic interpretation ==
The parashah has parallels or is discussed in these early nonrabbinic sources:

=== Genesis chapter 44 ===
Philo observed that having attained authority and presented with the opportunity for revenge for the ill-treatment that he had received, Joseph nonetheless bore what happened with self-restraint and governed himself.

== In classical rabbinic interpretation ==
The parashah is discussed in these rabbinic sources from the era of the Mishnah and the Talmud:

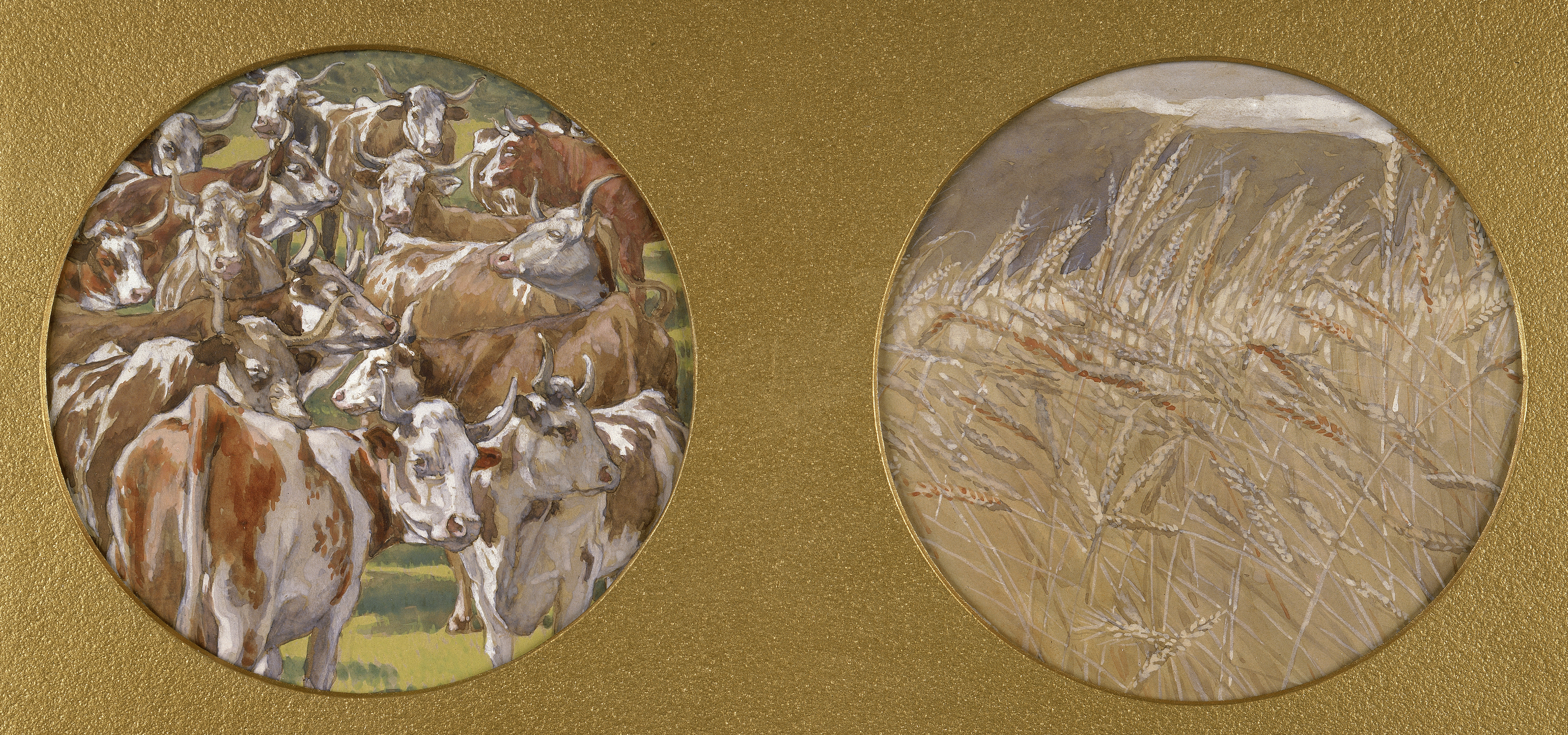
Pharaoh's Dreams (watercolor circa 1896–1902 by James Tissot)

=== Genesis chapter 41 ===
The Gemara noted that the words "two years of days (יָמִים, yamim)" in Genesis 41:1 means two years.

A Midrash asked what was so exceptional about the report of Genesis 41:1, "Pharaoh dreamed," as all people dream. The Midrash answered that while it is true that all people dream, a king's dream affects the whole world.

The Gemara taught that a dream is a sixtieth part of prophecy. Rabbi Ḥanan taught that even if the Master of Dreams (an angel, in a dream that truly foretells the future) tells a person that on the next day the person will die, the person should not desist from prayer, for as Ecclesiastes 5:6 says, "For in the multitude of dreams are vanities and also many words, but fear God." (Although a dream may seem reliably to predict the future, it will not necessarily come true; one must place one's trust in God.) Rabbi Samuel bar Naḥmani said in the name of Rabbi Jonathan that a person is shown in a dream only what is suggested by the person's own thoughts (while awake), as Daniel 2:29 says, "As for you, Oh King, your thoughts came into your mind upon your bed," and Daniel 2:30 says, "That you may know the thoughts of the heart." When Samuel had a bad dream, he used to quote Zechariah 10:2, "The dreams speak falsely." When he had a good dream, he used to question whether dreams speak falsely, seeing as in Numbers 12:6, God says, "I speak with him in a dream?" Rava pointed out the potential contradiction between Numbers 12:6 and Zechariah 10:2. The Gemara resolved the contradiction, teaching that Numbers 12:6, "I speak with him in a dream?" refers to dreams that come through an angel, whereas Zechariah 10:2, "The dreams speak falsely," refers to dreams that come through a demon.

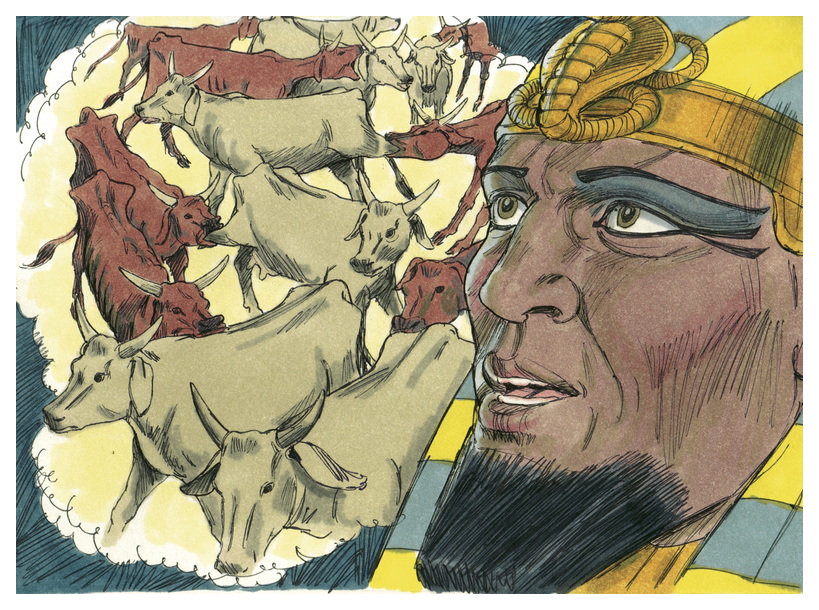
Pharaoh's Dream (1984 illustration by Jim Padgett, courtesy of Distant Shores Media/Sweet Publishing)

Rabbi Joḥanan taught that the wicked stand over their gods, as Genesis 41:1 says, "And Pharaoh dreamed, and, behold, he stood over the river." (The Egyptians worshipped the Nile as a god.) But God stands over them, as Genesis 28:13 says, "and, behold, the Lord stood over him." (Thus, idolaters must stand over and protect their idols, but God protects God's people.)

A Midrash taught that in the words of Genesis 41:2, "And, behold, there came up out of the river seven cows," God hinted to Pharaoh what his dream symbolized, for plenty does not come to Egypt other than from the Nile River, and likewise famine does not come to Egypt other than from the Nile River.

Rabbi Judah explained that Pharaoh's "spirit was troubled" in Genesis 41:8 because he wanted the interpretation of his dreams.

The Midrash Tanḥuma taught that the "magicians" (חַרְטֻמֵּי, chartumei) for whom Pharaoh sent in Genesis 41:8 were those who inquire of the bones (בטימי, betimei) of the dead (מֵתִים, meitim).

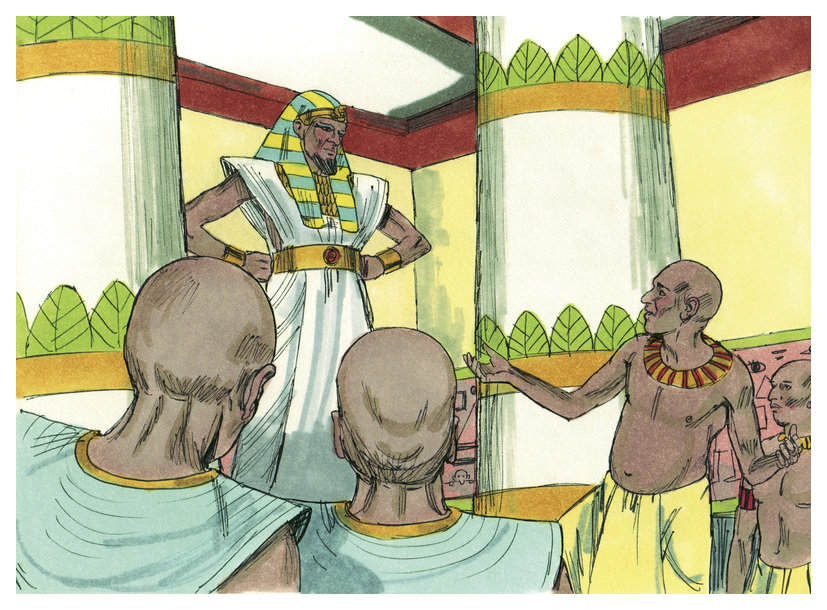
Pharaoh called the wisest magicians and thinkers of Egypt (1984 illustration by Jim Padgett, courtesy of Distant Shores Media/Sweet Publishing)

Reading in Genesis 41:8 that Pharaoh "sent and called for all the magicians of Egypt ... but there was none that could interpret them for Pharaoh," Rabbi Joshua of Siknin taught in Rabbi Levi's name that there were indeed interpreters of the dream, but their interpretations were unacceptable to Pharaoh (and thus "there were none ... for Pharaoh"). For example, the magicians said that the seven good cows meant that Pharaoh would have seven daughters and the seven ill-favored cows meant that Pharaoh would bury seven daughters. They told Pharaoh that the seven full ears of corn meant that Pharaoh would conquer seven provinces and the seven thin ears meant that seven provinces would revolt against him. Thus Rabbi Joshua concluded that the words of Proverbs 14:6, "A scorner seeks wisdom, and finds it not," applied to Pharaoh's magicians, while the continuation of the verse, "But knowledge is easy for him who has discernment," applied to Joseph.

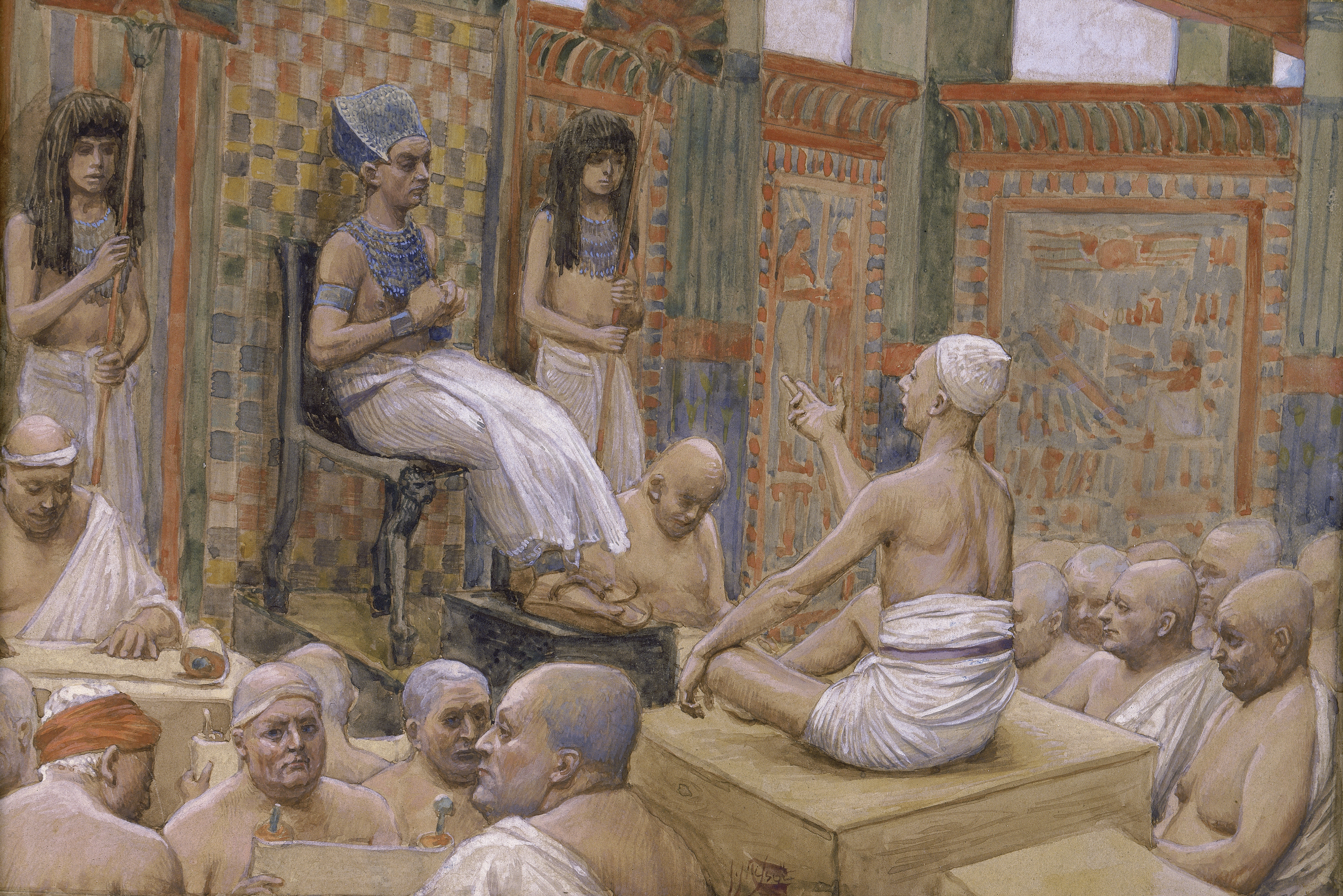
Joseph Interprets Pharaoh's Dream (watercolor circa 1896–1902 by James Tissot)

A Midrash read the words of Genesis 41:8, "he sent and called for all the magicians of Egypt . . . but there was none that could interpret them for Pharaoh," to teach that every nation in the world appoints five wise men as its ministers. And God grants each nation wisdom, understanding, and strength. When God judges the world, God takes these things away from the nation that God punishes, as Obadiah 1:8–9 says, "'Shall I not in that day,' says the Lord, 'destroy the wise men out of Edom, and discernment [understanding] out of the mount of Esau? And your mighty men, O Teman, shall be dismayed—broken.'" The Midrash taught that the purpose of all this sending for and failing of magicians was so that Joseph might come at the end and be raised to high rank. God saw that if Joseph came at the beginning and interpreted the dream, Joseph would gain little praise, for the magicians would be able to say that had one asked them, we would have interpreted the dream long before. Therefore, God waited until the magicians had wearied and had exhausted Pharaoh's spirit, and then Joseph came and restored it. Thus Proverbs 29:11, "A fool spends all his spirit," refers to Pharaoh's magicians, and the continuation of Proverbs 29:11, "But a wise man stills it within him," alludes to Joseph, as Genesis 41:39 reports that Pharaoh said to Joseph, "There is none so discreet and wise as you."

Rabbi Ḥiyya bar Abba said in the name of Rabbi Joḥanan that God intervened to cause Pharaoh to be angry with his servants, the chief cupbearer and the baker, in order to fulfill the fate of a righteous man, Joseph, in Genesis 41:12.

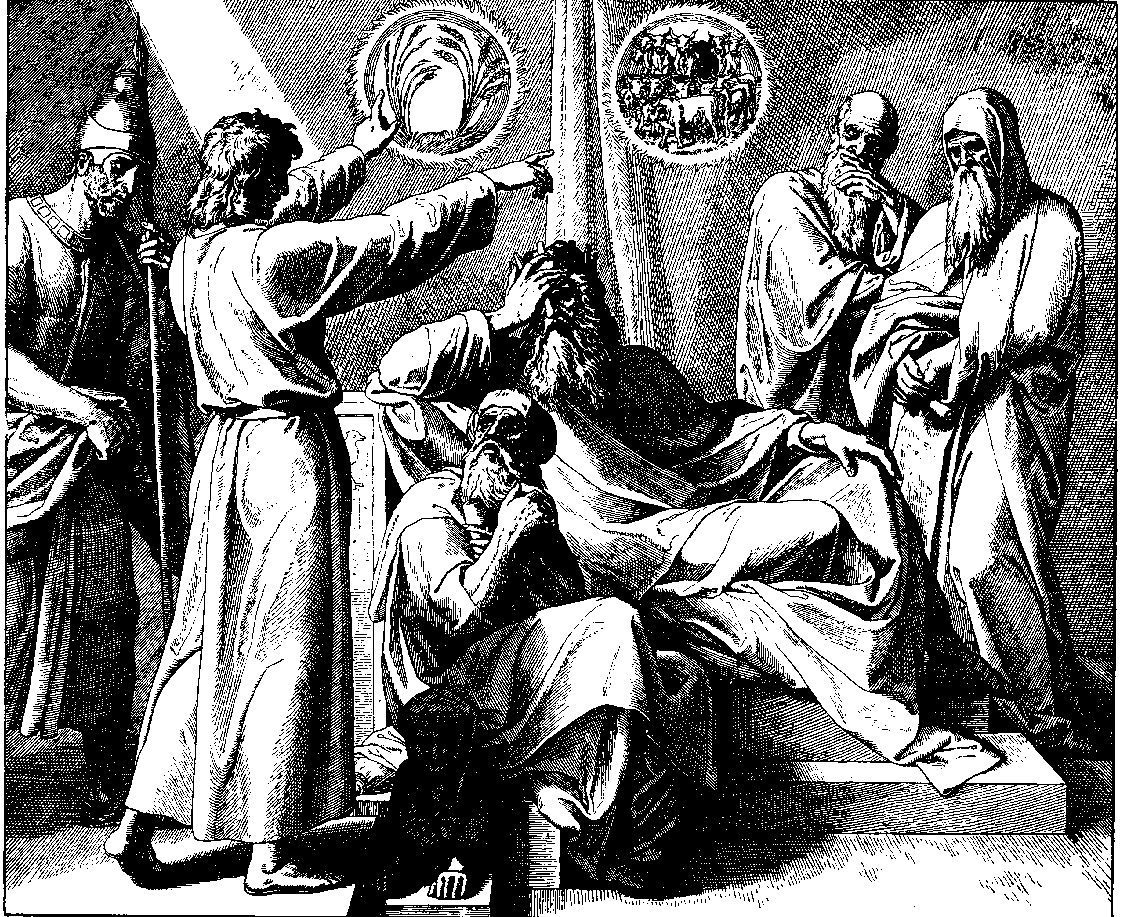
Joseph Interprets Pharaoh's Dream (woodcut by Julius Schnorr von Carolsfeld from the 1860 Die Bibel in Bildern)

Rabbi Bana'ah argued that the import—and potential prophetic nature—of a dream on the waking world follows its interpretation. Rabbi Eleazar found Biblical support for the proposition in the chief cupbearer's words about Joseph in Genesis 41:13, "As he interpreted for us, so it came to pass." Rava added a qualification, concluding that a dream follows its interpretation only if the interpretation corresponds to the content of the dream, for the chief cupbearer said in Genesis 41:12, "To each man according to his dream he did interpret."

Reading Genesis 41:14, "And Joseph shaved himself and changed his clothes," a Midrash taught that cutting his hair improved his appearance and made him look handsome.

A Midrash taught that "Joseph shaved himself and changed his clothes" (as reported in Genesis 41:14) out of respect for royalty.

Rabbi Joshua ben Levi taught that those who dream of shaving should rise early and say the words of Genesis 41:14, "And Joseph shaved himself and changed his clothes," to prevent thinking of Samson's less favorable encounter with the razor in Judges 16:17, "If I am shaven, then my strength will go from me."

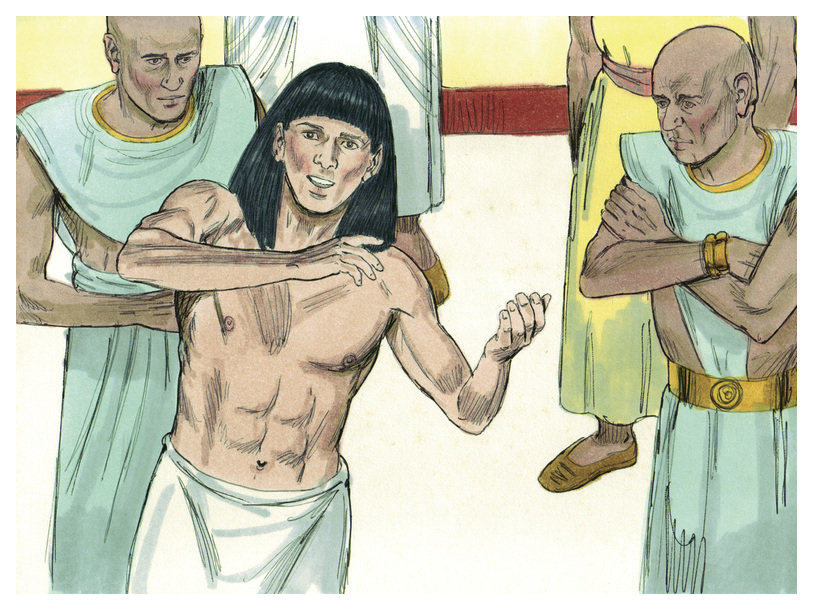
"God is trying to tell you the same thing in both dreams," explained Joseph (1984 illustration by Jim Padgett, courtesy of Distant Shores Media/Sweet Publishing)

Rabbi Joḥanan said that three kinds of dreams are fulfilled: A dream of the morning, a dream that one's friend dreamed about one, and a dream that is interpreted within a dream. And some say that a dream that is repeated several times is also fulfilled, as Genesis 41:32 says: "And for that the dream was doubled unto Pharaoh twice, it is because the thing is established by God, and God will shortly bring it to pass."

Noting the differences between the narrator's account of Pharaoh's dreams in Genesis 41:1–7 and Pharaoh's recounting of them to Joseph in Genesis 41:17–24, a Midrash taught that Pharaoh somewhat changed his account so as to test Joseph. As reported in Genesis 41:18, Pharaoh said, "Behold, there came up out of the river seven cows, fat-fleshed and well-favored" (בְּרִיאוֹת בָּשָׂר, וִיפֹת תֹּאַר, beriot basar, vifot toar). But Joseph replied that this was not what Pharaoh had seen, for they were (in the words of Genesis 41:2) "well-favored and fat-fleshed" (יְפוֹת מַרְאֶה, וּבְרִיאֹת בָּשָׂר, yifot mareh, uvriot basar). As reported in Genesis 41:19, Pharaoh said, "seven other cows came up after them, poor and very ill-favored [דַּלּוֹת וְרָעוֹת, dalot veraot] and lean-fleshed." But Joseph replied that this was not what Pharaoh had seen, for they were (in the words of Genesis 41:3) "ill-favored and lean-fleshed" (רָעוֹת מַרְאֶה, וְדַקּוֹת בָּשָׂר, raot mareh, vedakot basar). As reported in Genesis 41:22, Pharaoh said that there were seven stalks, "full (מְלֵאֹת, meleiot) and good." But Joseph replied that this was not what Pharaoh had seen, for they were (in the words of Genesis 41:5) "healthy [בְּרִיאוֹת, beriot] and good." As reported in Genesis 41:23, Pharaoh said that there were then seven stalks, "withered, thin" (צְנֻמוֹת דַּקּוֹת, tzenumot dakot). But Joseph replied that this was not what Pharaoh had seen, for they were (in the words of Genesis 41:6) "thin and blasted with the east wind" (דַּקּוֹת וּשְׁדוּפֹת קָדִים, dakot u-shedufot kadim). Pharaoh began to wonder, and told Joseph that Joseph must have been behind Pharaoh when he dreamed, as Genesis 41:39 says, "Forasmuch as God has shown you all this." And this was the intent of Jacob's blessing of Joseph in Genesis 49:22, "Joseph is a fruitful vine" (בֵּן פֹּרָת יוֹסֵף, bein porat Yoseif), which the Midrash taught one should read as, "Joseph was among the cows" (בֵּן הַפָּרוֹת יוֹסֵף, bein ha-parot Yoseif). So Pharaoh then told Joseph, in the words of Genesis 41:40, "You shall be over my house."

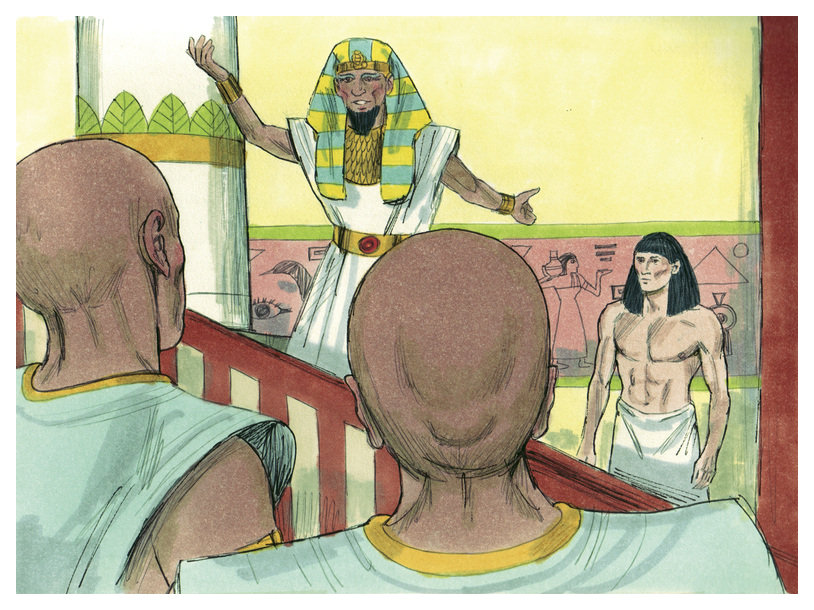
Pharaoh said, "Who could be better than Joseph?" (1984 illustration by Jim Padgett, courtesy of Distant Shores Media/Sweet Publishing)

The Pirke De-Rabbi Eliezer taught that the Holy Spirit rested upon Joseph, enabling him to interpret Pharaoh's dream, as Genesis 41:38 reports, "And Pharaoh said to his servants, 'Can we find such a one as this, a man in whom the spirit of God is?'"

A Midrash interpreted Pharaoh's exclamation in Genesis 41:38, "Can we find such a one as this?" to mean that if they went to the end of the world, they would not find another one like Joseph.

Reading Genesis 41:43, "And he made him ride in his double chariot," a Baraita in the Jerusalem Talmud deduced that at first, only two horses pulled chariots. But from Exodus 14:6, "With three on all of them," the Baraita deduced that a later Pharaoh made chariots drawn by three horses. And the Baraita further reported that the Roman Empire made chariots drawn by four horses.

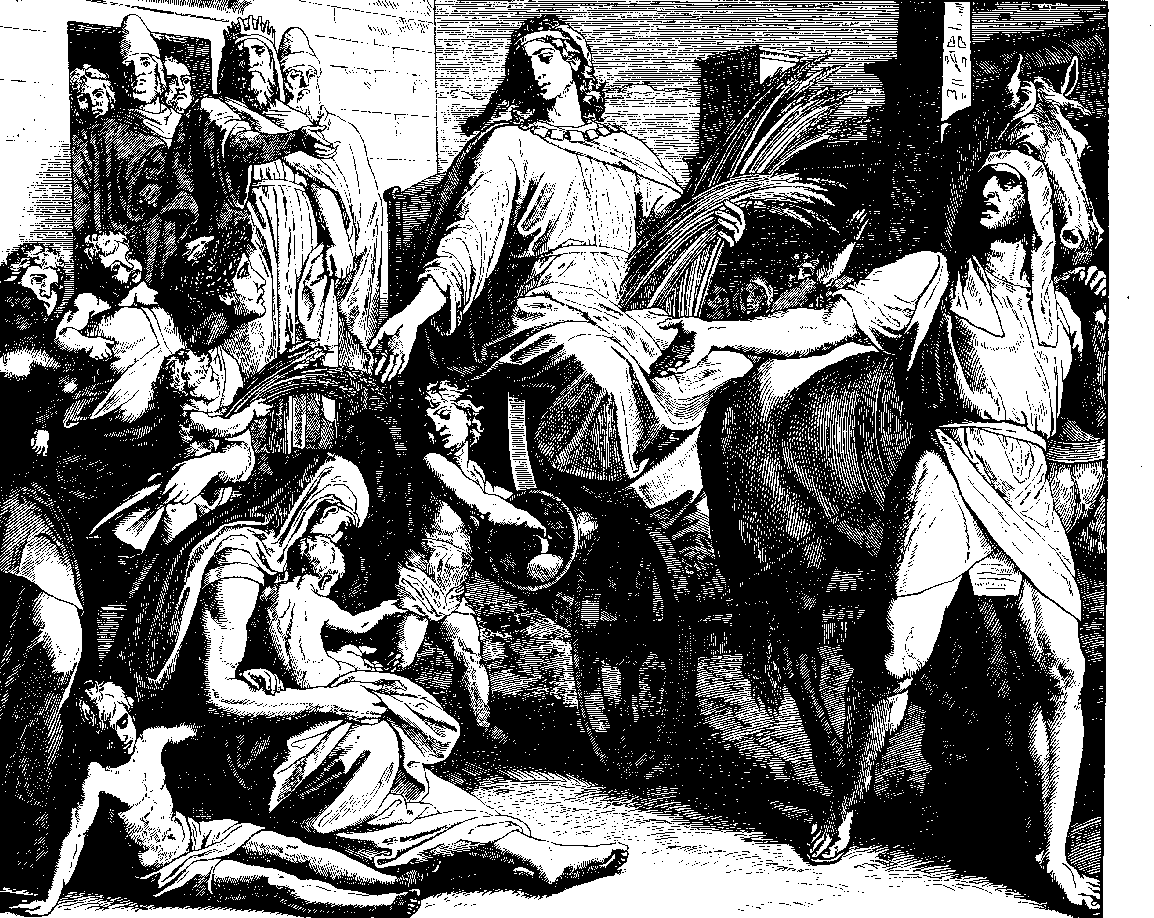
Joseph Is Ruler Over All Egypt (woodcut by Julius Schnorr von Carolsfeld from the 1860 Die Bibel in Bildern)

The Pirke De-Rabbi Eliezer taught that when Joseph rode in his chariot (as described in Genesis 41:43), the Egyptian girls climbed up the walls to see him and threw him rings of gold so that he might look at them and they could see the beauty of his figure.

Rav read the reference in Genesis 41:45 to "Potiphera" to refer to "Potiphar." Reading the words of Genesis 39:1, "And Potiphar, an officer [סְרִיס, seris] of Pharaoh's, bought him," Rav taught that Potiphar bought Joseph for himself (to make Joseph his lover), but the archangel Gabriel castrated Potiphar (as the Hebrew word for "officer," סְרִיס, seris, also means "eunuch") and then mutilated Potiphar, for originally Genesis 39:1 records his name as "Potiphar," but afterwards Genesis 41:45 records his name as "Potiphera" (and the ending of his name, פֶרַע, fera, alludes to the word feirio, indicating his mutilation).

Rabbi Levi used Genesis 37:2, 41:46, and 45:6 to calculate that Joseph's dreams that his brothers would bow to him took 22 years to come true, and deduced that a person should thus wait for as much as 22 years for a positive dream's fulfillment.

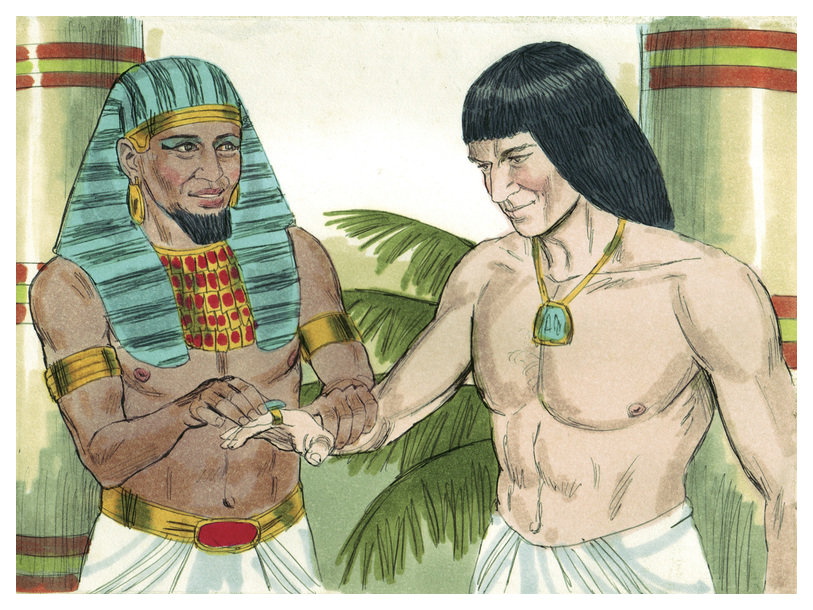
Pharaoh took off his signet ring from his hand, and put it upon Joseph's hand (1984 illustration by Jim Padgett, courtesy of Distant Shores Media/Sweet Publishing)

Rabbi Ḥiyya bar Abba taught in the name of Rabbi Joḥanan that when in Genesis 41:44 Pharaoh conferred power on Joseph, Pharaoh's astrologers questioned whether Pharaoh would set in power over them a slave whom his master bought for 20 pieces of silver. Pharaoh replied to them that he discerned royal characteristics in Joseph. Pharaoh's astrologers said to Pharaoh that in that case, Joseph must be able to speak the 70 languages of the world. That night, the angel Gabriel came to teach Joseph the 70 languages, but Joseph could not learn them. Thereupon Gabriel added a letter from God's Name to Joseph's name, and Joseph was able to learn the languages, as Psalm 81:6 reports, "He appointed it in Joseph for a testimony, when he went out over the land of Egypt, where I (Joseph) heard a language that I knew not." The next day, in whatever language Pharaoh spoke to Joseph, Joseph was able to reply to Pharaoh. But when Joseph spoke to Pharaoh in Hebrew, Pharaoh did not understand what he said. So Pharaoh asked Joseph to teach it to him. Joseph tried to teach Pharaoh Hebrew, but Pharaoh could not learn it. Pharaoh asked Joseph to swear that he would not reveal his failing, and Joseph swore. Later, in Genesis 50:5, when Joseph related to Pharaoh that Jacob had made Joseph swear to bury him in the Land of Israel, Pharaoh asked Joseph to seek to be released from the oath. But Joseph replied that in that case, he would also ask to be released from his oath to Pharaoh concerning Pharaoh's ignorance of languages. As a consequence, even though it was displeasing to Pharaoh, Pharaoh told Joseph in Genesis 50:6, "Go up and bury your father, as he made you swear."

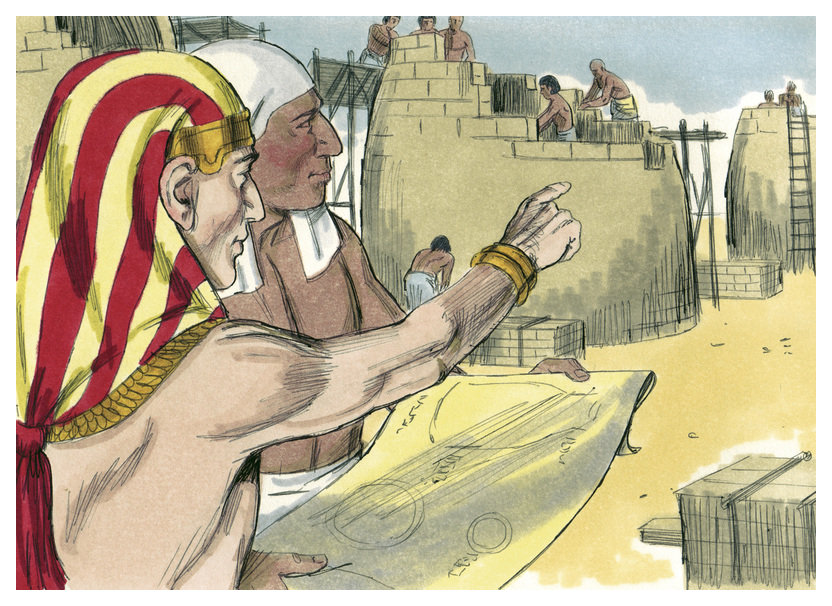
Joseph gathered up all the food (1984 illustration by Jim Padgett, courtesy of Distant Shores Media/Sweet Publishing)

Reading Genesis 41:48, "He placed food in the cities; the food that came from a city's surrounding fields he placed in its midst," Rabbi Judah taught that Joseph stored the crops of Tiberias in Tiberias, and the crops of Sepphoris in Sepphoris, so that every region preserved its own produce. Rabbi Judah thus argued that Joseph increased efficiency by decentralizing food distribution. The Rabbis observed that if all the citizens of Tiberias consumed the produce grown in Tiberias, and all the citizens of Sepphoris consumed the produce grown in Sepphoris, then they would not get a handful each. The Rabbis concluded that a blessing rested on the stored produce, for there was enough for all.

Resh Lakish deduced from the words, "And to Joseph were born two sons before the year of famine came," in Genesis 41:50 that Joseph did not have marital relations during the famine, and generalized that no man should. The Gemara qualified the injunction, however, teaching that childless people may have marital relations in years of famine. Similarly, reading Genesis 41:50, "And to Joseph were born two sons," Rabbi Muna and Rav Huna taught that this occurred before the famine came.

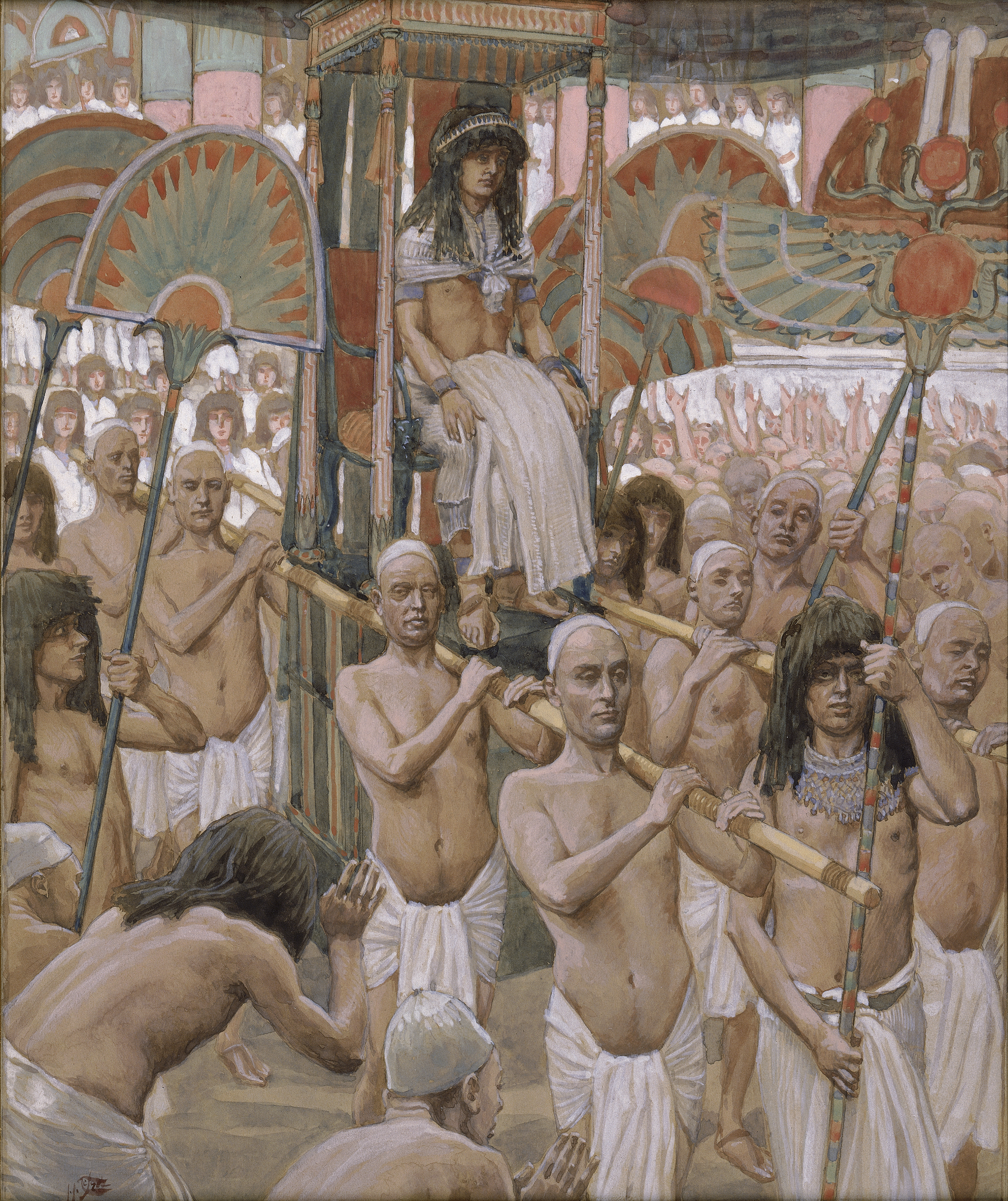
The Glory of Joseph (watercolor circa 1896–1902 by James Tissot)

A Midrash applied the words of Ecclesiastes 8:4, "the king's word has power" (שִׁלְטוֹן, shilton) to Joseph's story. The Midrash taught that God rewarded Joseph for resisting Potiphar's wife by making him ruler (הַשַּׁלִּיט, hashalit) over the land of Egypt (as reported in Genesis 42:6). "The king's word" of Ecclesiastes 8:4 were manifest when, as Genesis 41:17 reports, "Pharaoh spoke to Joseph: In my dream ..." And the word "power" (שִׁלְטוֹן, shilton) of Ecclesiastes 8:4 corresponds to the report of Genesis 42:6, "And Joseph was the governor [הַשַּׁלִּיט, hashalit] over the land." The words of Ecclesiastes 8:4, "And who may say to him: 'What are you doing?'" are thus reflected in Pharaoh's words of Genesis 41:55, "Go to Joseph; what he says to you, do." The Midrash taught that Joseph received so much honor because he observed the commandments, as Ecclesiastes 8:5 teaches when it says, "Whoever keeps the commandment shall know no evil thing."

A Midrash told that when the famine became severe in Egypt, the Egyptians cried out to Joseph for bread. Joseph told them to circumcise themselves first. They cried out to Pharaoh, as Genesis 41:55 reports, and Pharaoh told them to go to Joseph. The people complained that Joseph asked them to circumcise themselves, and they complained that it was not fitting for a Hebrew to wield power over Egyptians. Calling them fools, Pharaoh recalled that during the years of plenty, a herald had continually proclaimed that a famine was coming, and asked why they had not saved grain in reserve. The people replied that all the grain that they had left had rotted. Pharaoh asked them whether any flour was left from the day before. The people replied that even the bread in their baskets had gone moldy. Pharaoh answered that if grain rotted at Joseph's decree, perhaps he might decree that the Egyptians die. So Pharaoh directed them to go to Joseph and obey him, even if he told them to cut off something of their flesh.

Reading Genesis 41:56, "And the famine was over all the face of the earth," a Midrash asked why the text did not simply say, "And the famine was over the earth." Rabbi Samuel ben Naḥman answered that Genesis 41:56 teaches that the famine began with the wealthy, for the expression "the face of the earth" refers to the wealthy. The wealthy have a smiling face to show their friends, but the poor hide their face in embarrassment.

Rav Judah in the name of Samuel deduced from Genesis 47:14 that Joseph gathered in and brought to Egypt all the gold and silver in the world. The Gemara noted that Genesis 47:14 says: "And Joseph gathered up all the money that was found in the land of Egypt, and in the land of Canaan," and thus spoke about the wealth of only Egypt and Canaan. The Gemara found support for the proposition that Joseph collected the wealth of other countries from Genesis 41:57, which states: "And all the countries came to Egypt to Joseph to buy corn." The Gemara deduced from the words "and they despoiled the Egyptians" in Exodus 12:36 that when the Israelites left Egypt, they carried that wealth away with them. The Gemara then taught that the wealth lay in Israel until the time of King Rehoboam, when King Shishak of Egypt seized it from Rehoboam, as 1 Kings 14:25–26 reports: "And it came to pass in the fifth year of king Rehoboam, that Shishak king of Egypt came up against Jerusalem; and he took away the treasures of the house of the Lord, and the treasures of the king's house." Similarly, the Avot of Rabbi Natan cited Genesis 47:14 for the proposition that the silver of Egypt thus returned to its place of origin in Egypt.

=== Genesis chapter 42 ===
Rabbi Joḥanan reread the words of Genesis 42:1, "Now Jacob saw that there was corn [שֶׁבֶר, shever] in Egypt," to read, "Now Jacob saw that there was hope [שֵׂבֶר, sever] in Egypt." Rabbi Joḥanan taught that Genesis 42:1 thus bears out the text of Psalm 146:5, "Happy is he whose help is the God of Jacob, whose hope [שִׂבְרוֹ, sivro] is in the Lord his God." Similarly, Resh Lakish taught that Psalm 146:5, "whose hope [שִׂבְרוֹ, sivro] is in the Lord his God," refers to Joseph, who was the hope for the entire world when he was in Egypt. And God showed Jacob that his hope (שִׂבְרוֹ, sivro) was in Egypt, as Genesis 42:1 can be read, "Now Jacob saw that there was hope [שֵׂבֶר, sever] in Egypt."

The Sages read Genesis 42:1 to teach that Jacob warned his sons against appearing well fed when others around them were without food. The Sages taught that if one fasted on account of some trouble and it passed, or for a sick person and the sick person recovered, then the one fasting should nevertheless complete the fast. If one journeyed from a place where they were not fasting to a place where they were, then one should fast with the people of the new place. If one journeyed from a place where they were fasting to a place where they were not, then one should nevertheless complete the fast. If one forgot and ate and drank, then one should not make it apparent in public nor indulge in luxuries. For the Sages read Genesis 42:1 to say, "And Jacob said to his sons: 'Why should you show yourself?'" Thus, the Sages taught, Jacob conveyed to his sons: "When you are fully sated, do not show yourselves either before Esau or before Ishmael, so that they should not envy you." Similarly, a Midrash read Genesis 42:1 to say, "And Jacob said to his sons: 'Why should you be conspicuous?'" The Midrash interpreted Genesis 42:1 to mean that Jacob told his sons that they were all strong and brotherly; they were not to enter through one gate and all stand in the same place, so that they should not tempt the evil eye.

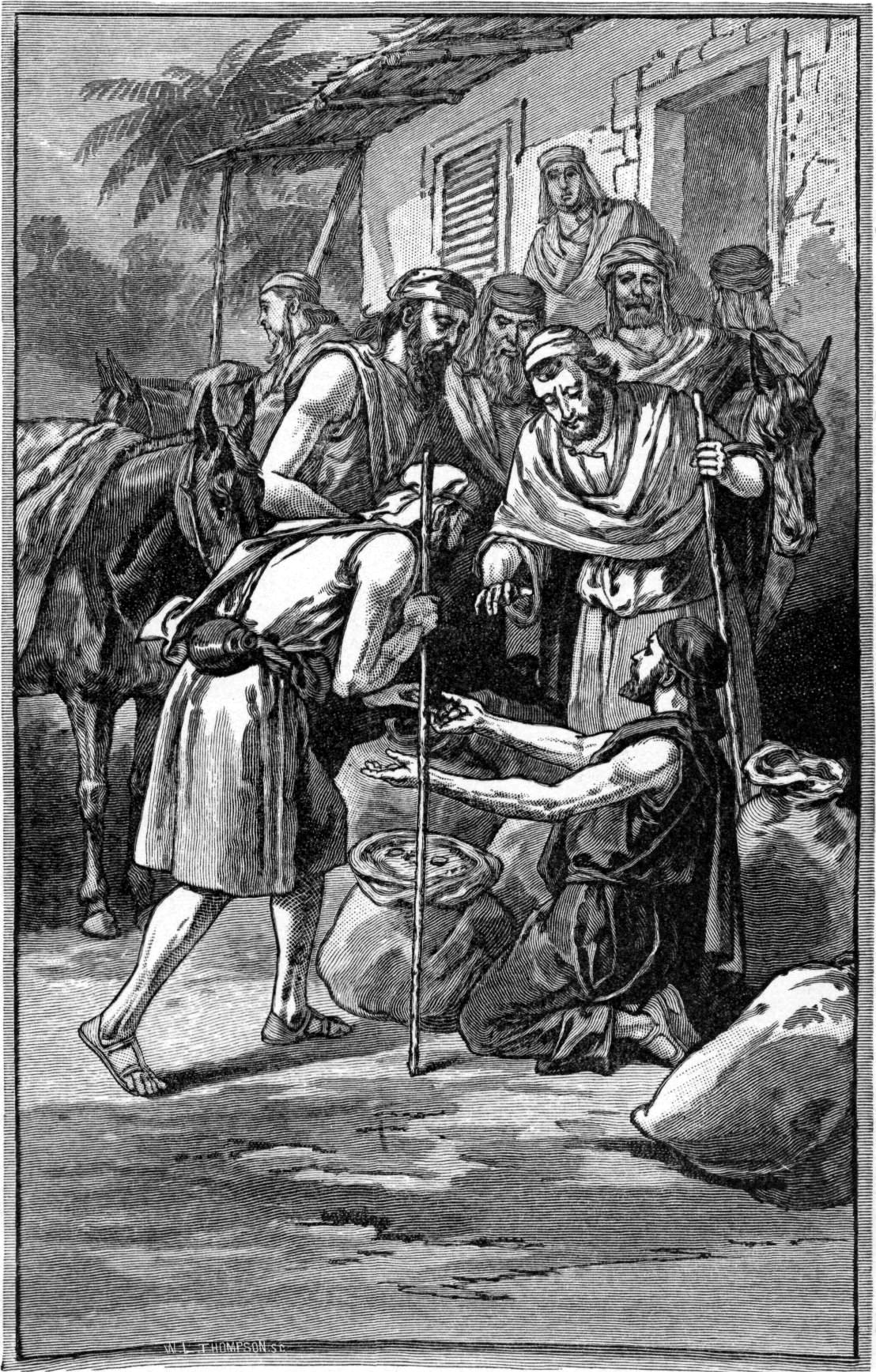
Joseph's Brothers Found the Money (illustration from the 1897 Bible Pictures and What They Teach Us by Charles Foster)

Similarly, a Midrash taught that Jacob asked his sons not to go out with food in their hands, or with weapons, and not to show themselves to be well fed, lest neighbors come and wage war against Jacob. For the Midrash read the words "look one on another" in Genesis 42:1 to allude to war, as in 2 Kings 14:8, "Come, let us look one another in the face."

Interpreting Jacob's question to his sons in Genesis 42:1, "Why do you look one on another?" a Midrash taught that when Jacob told them to go down to Egypt, they looked at one another, thinking of Joseph. When Jacob realized this, he said in Genesis 42:2, "Go down there."

Rava said that Rav Sheshet read Genesis 42:6 to teach that one who teaches Torah will receive blessings like Joseph. For Proverbs 11:26 (which the Gemara read to allude to teaching Torah) says, "But blessing shall be upon the head of one who provides (מַשְׁבִּיר, mashbir) [Torah]," and Genesis 42:6 uses the same word "provide" (מַשְׁבִּיר, mashbir) to refer to Joseph when it says, "And Joseph was the governor of the land, and he was the provider (הַמַּשְׁבִּיר, ha-mashbir) to all the people of the land."

Reading Genesis 42:8, Rav Ḥisda explained that Joseph's brothers did not recognize him because when they last saw him, he did not yet have a full beard, and he did have a full beard when his brothers saw him in Egypt, demonstrating that people's appearance can change so much over time that even their own family may not recognize them.

The Pirke De-Rabbi Eliezer taught that all the nations came to Joseph to purchase food and Joseph understood their languages and spoke to each people in their own tongue. Therefore, he was called Turgeman (interpreter), as Genesis 42:23 says, "For Joseph understood them, for there was an interpreter between them."

A Midrash asked who "took him, and cast him into the pit" in Genesis 37:24, and replied that it was his brother Simeon. And the Midrash taught that Simeon was repaid when in Genesis 42:24, Joseph took Simeon from among the brothers and had him bound before their eyes.

When talking with Rabbi Joḥanan, the young son of Resh Lakish cited the complaint of Joseph's brothers in Genesis 42:28, "What is this that God has done to us?" as an example of how people blame God for misfortune that they bring upon themselves.

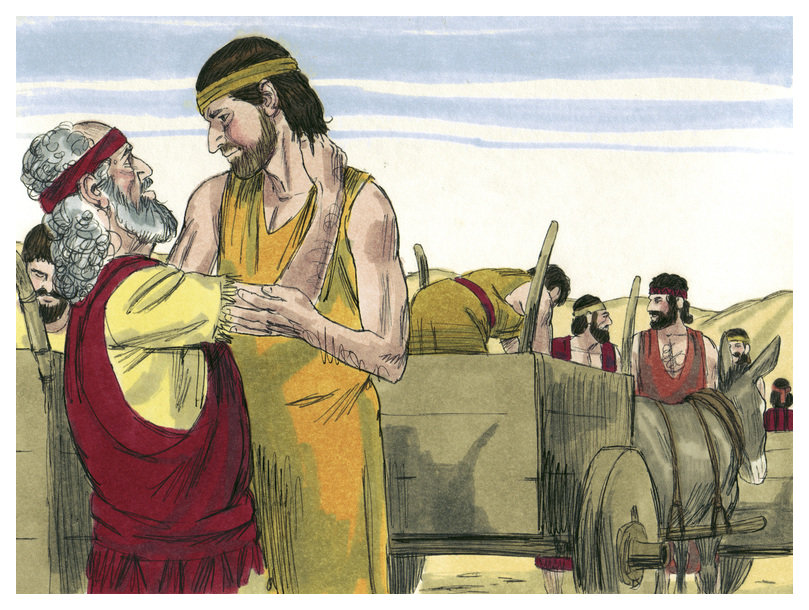
Jacob unhappily agreed to let them take Benjamin (1984 illustration by Jim Padgett, courtesy of Distant Shores Media/Sweet Publishing)

=== Genesis chapter 43 ===
Rav Huna deduced from Judah's commitment to Jacob with regard to Benjamin in Genesis 43:9, "I will be surety for him; of my hand shall you require him," that a guarantor becomes responsible for the debt that he has guaranteed. Rav Ḥisda, however, demurred, saying that Judah assumed an unconditional obligation to return Benjamin, for in Genesis 42:37, Reuben promised, "Deliver him into my hand, and I will bring him back to you," and Judah surely promised no less than Reuben.

Reading Judah's contingent vow in Genesis 43:8–9, "Send the lad with me ...; if I do not bring him to you and set him before you, then let me bear the blame forever," Rav Judah in the name of Rav deduced that a conditional exclusion, even if self-imposed, requires formal annulment. The Gemara told that all through the 40 years that the Israelites wandered in the wilderness, Judah's bones were jolted about in their coffin until Moses asked God for mercy on Judah's behalf and to annul Judah's vow.

A Midrash read the steward's words to the brothers in Genesis 43:23, "Peace be to you, fear not; your God, and the God of your father, has given you treasure," to mean that God benefitted them either for their own sake or for their father Jacob's sake.

Rabbi Ḥiyya the Elder met a Babylonian in the Land of Israel and asked him about the welfare of Rabbi Ḥiyya's father in Babylon. The Babylonian replied that Rabbi Ḥiyya's mother in Babylon had asked about Rabbi Ḥiyya. Rabbi Ḥiyya exclaimed that he asked one thing and the Babylonian spoke to him of another. The Babylonian replied that people ask about the living, but not about the dead (hinting that Rabbi Ḥiyya's father had died). The Midrash thus read Joseph's question, "Is your father well?" in Genesis 43:27 to allude to Jacob, and Joseph's reference in Genesis 43:27 to "the old man of whom you spoke" to allude to Isaac. When Genesis 43:28 reports, "And they said: 'Your servant our father is well, he is yet alive,'" the Midrash interpreted the brothers to imply that Isaac had died.

Rav Judah taught that three things shorten a person's years: (1) to be given a Torah scroll from which to read and to refuse, (2) to be given a cup of benediction over which to say grace and to refuse, and (3) to assume airs of authority. To support the proposition that assuming airs of authority shortens one's life, the Gemara cited the teaching of Rabbi Ḥama bar Ḥanina that Joseph died (as Genesis 50:26 reports, aged 110) before his brothers because he assumed airs of authority (when in Genesis 43:28 and 44:24–32 he repeatedly allowed his brothers to describe his father Jacob as "your servant").

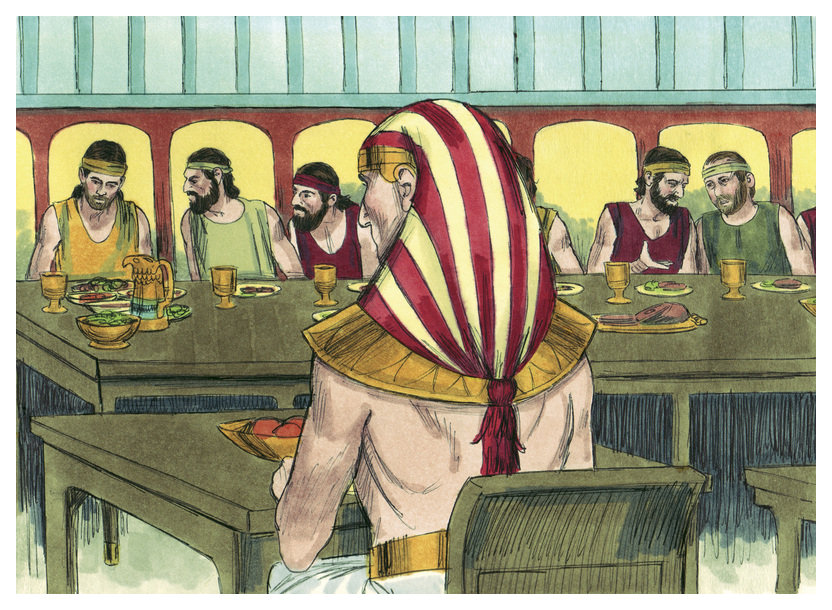
The brothers were seated in order of age. (1984 illustration by Jim Padgett, courtesy of Distant Shores Media/Sweet Publishing)

Rabbi Samuel ben Naḥman taught that when Joseph saw Benjamin, his mind was immediately set at rest and he exclaimed in the words of Genesis 43:29, "God be gracious to you, my son," and ordered that they bring him near. Joseph then asked Benjamin whether he had a brother. Benjamin replied that he had a brother, but did not know where he had gone. Joseph asked Benjamin whether he had wife. Benjamin replied that he had a wife and ten sons. Joseph asked what their names were. Benjamin replied with their names, as listed in Genesis 46:21, explaining that their names reflected Benjamin's loss of Joseph. The name Bela signified that Benjamin's brother was swallowed up (nit-bala) from him; Becher signified that he was a firstborn (bechor); Ashbel signified that he was taken away captive (nishbah); Gera signified that he became a stranger (ger) in a strange country; Naaman signified that his actions were seemly (na'im) and pleasant (ne'im-im); Ehi signified that he indeed was "my brother" (ahi); Rosh signified that he was Benjamin's superior (rosh); Muppim signified that he was exceedingly attractive (yafeh ‘ad me'od) in all matters; and Huppim signified that Benjamin did not see his marriage-canopy (huppah) and he did not see Benjamin's; and Ard signified that he was like a rose-bloom (ward).

Rabbi Melai taught in the name of Rabbi Isaac of Magdala that from the day that Joseph departed from his brothers he abstained from wine, reading Genesis 49:26 to report, "The blessings of your father ... shall be on the head of Joseph, and on the crown of the head of him who was a nazirite (since his departure) from his brethren." Rabbi Jose ben Ḥanina taught that the brothers also abstained from wine after they departed from him, for Genesis 43:34 reports, "And they drank, and were merry with him," implying that they broke their abstention "with him." But Rabbi Melai taught that the brothers did drink wine in moderation since their separation from Joseph, and only when reunited with Joseph did they drink to intoxication "with him."

=== Genesis chapter 44 ===
A Tanna taught that in Genesis 45:24 Joseph told his brethren not to take big strides and bring the sun into the city. For a Master taught that big strides rob a person of one five-hundredth part of that person's eyesight. And on bringing the sun into the city, Rav Judah said in the name of Rav that one should always leave a city by daylight and enter a city by daylight, as Genesis 44:3 reports that Joseph delayed until daylight to send his brothers away.

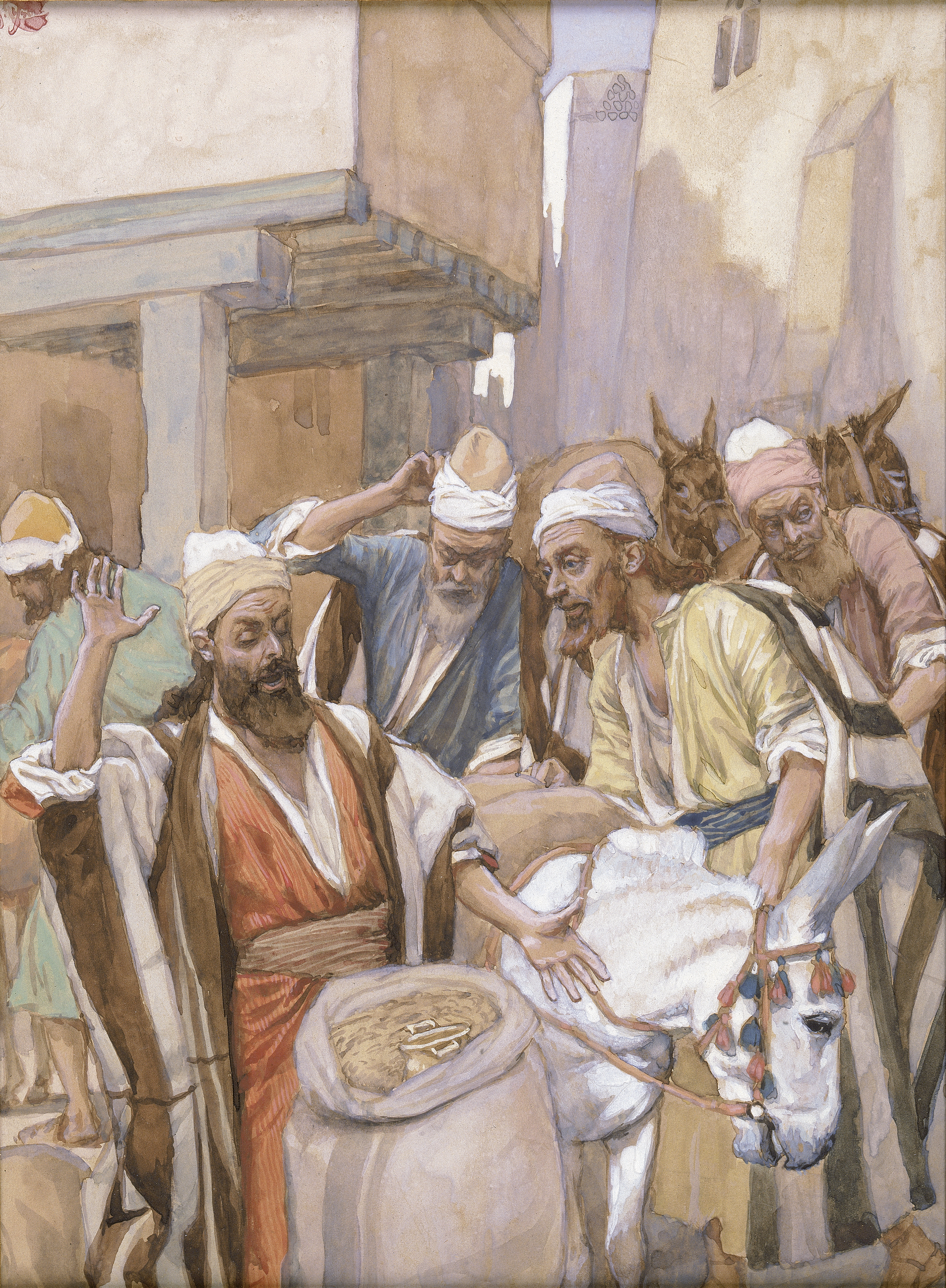
The Cup Found (watercolor circa 1896–1902 by James Tissot)

Rabbi Ishmael cited Genesis 44:8 as one of ten a fortiori (kal va-chomer) arguments recorded in the Hebrew Bible: (1) In Genesis 44:8, Joseph's brothers told Joseph, "Behold, the money that we found in our sacks' mouths we brought back to you," and they thus reasoned, "how then should we steal?" (2) In Exodus 6:12, Moses told God, "Behold, the children of Israel have not hearkened to me," and reasoned that surely all the more, "How then shall Pharaoh hear me?" (3) In Deuteronomy 31:27, Moses said to the Israelites, "Behold, while I am yet alive with you this day, you have been rebellious against the Lord," and reasoned that it would follow, "And how much more after my death?" (4) In Numbers 12:14, "the Lord said to Moses: 'If her (Miriam's) father had but spit in her face,'" surely it would stand to reason, "'Should she not hide in shame seven days?'" (5) In Jeremiah 12:5, the prophet asked, "If you have run with the footmen, and they have wearied you," is it not logical to conclude, "Then how can you contend with horses?" (6) In 1 Samuel 23:3, David's men said to him, "Behold, we are afraid here in Judah," and thus surely it stands to reason, "How much more then if we go to Keilah?" (7) Also in Jeremiah 12:5, the prophet asked, "And if in a land of Peace where you are secure" you are overcome, is it not logical to ask, "How will you do in the thickets of the Jordan?" (8) Proverbs 11:31 reasoned, "Behold, the righteous shall be requited in the earth," and does it not follow, "How much more the wicked and the sinner?" (9) In Esther 9:12, "The king said to Esther the queen: 'The Jews have slain and destroyed 500 men in Shushan the castle,'" and it thus stands to reason, "'What then have they done in the rest of the king's provinces?'" (10) In Ezekiel 15:5, God came to the prophet saying, "Behold, when it was whole, it was usable for no work," and thus surely it is logical to argue, "How much less, when the fire has devoured it, and it is singed?"

A Midrash told that when in Genesis 44:12 the steward found Joseph's cup in Benjamin's belongings, his brothers beat Benjamin on his shoulders, calling him a thief and the son of a thief, and saying that he had shamed them as Rachel had shamed Jacob when she stole Laban's idols in Genesis 31:19. And by virtue of receiving those unwarranted blows between his shoulders, Benjamin's descendants merited having the Divine Presence rest between his shoulders and the Temple rest in Jerusalem, as Deuteronomy 33:12 reports, "He dwells between his shoulders."

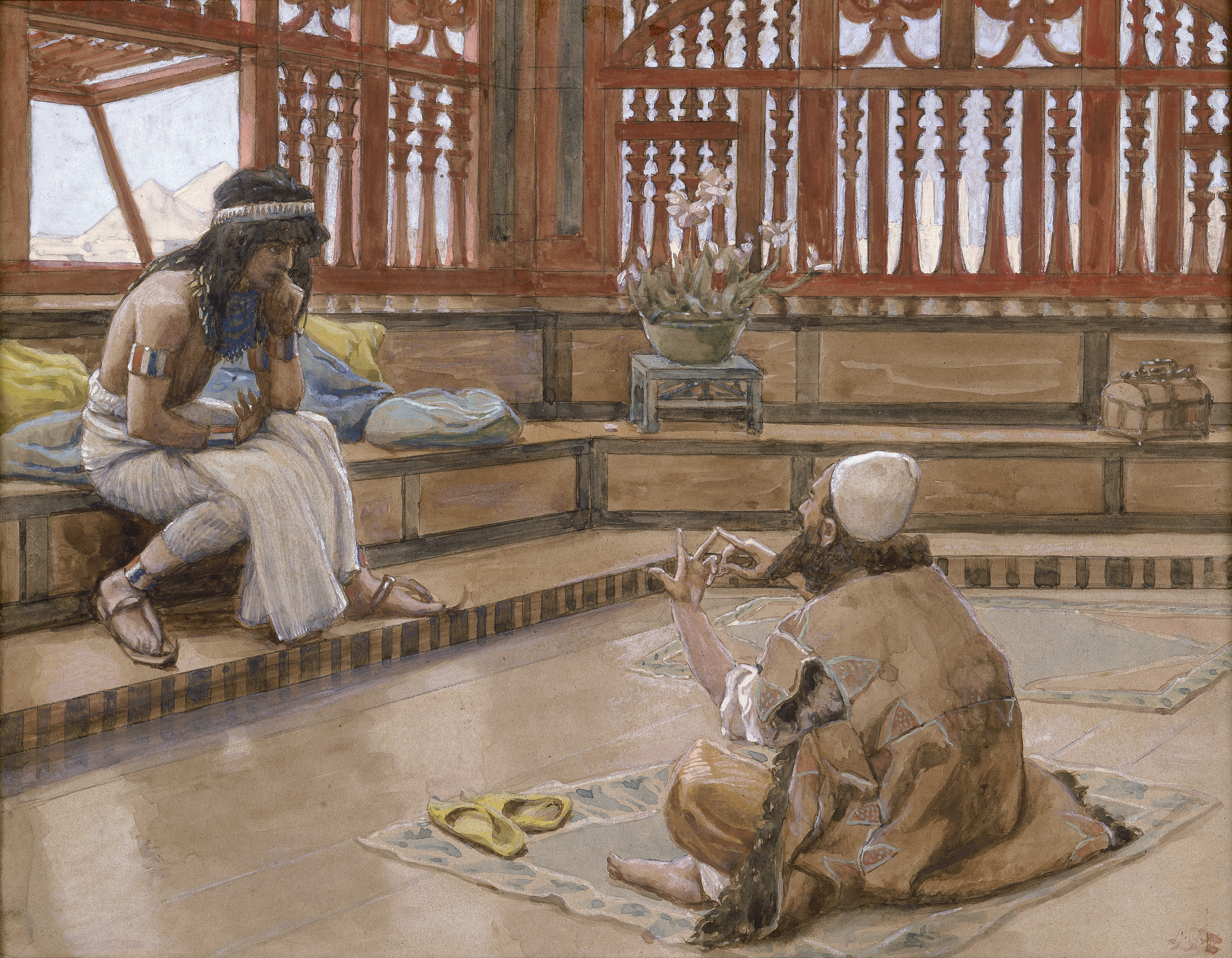
Joseph Converses with Judah, His Brother (watercolor circa 1896–1902 by James Tissot)

Rabbi Judah ben Ilai taught that Scripture speaks in praise of Judah. Rabbi Judah noted that on three occasions, Scripture records that Judah spoke before his brethren, and they made him king over them (bowing to his authority): (1) in Genesis 37:26, which reports, "Judah said to his brethren: 'What profit is it if we slay our brother'"; (2) in Genesis 44:14, which reports, "Judah and his brethren came to Joseph's house"; and (3) in Genesis 44:18, which reports, "Then Judah came near" to Joseph to argue for Benjamin.

Rav Naḥman bar Isaac quoted Judah's words, "What shall we speak or how shall we clear ourselves" (נִּצְטַדָּק, niztadak), in Genesis 44:16 as an example of where the Torah used an abbreviation. Rav Naḥman bar Isaac read the word נִּצְטַדָּק, NiZTaDaK, "can we show innocence," as an acronym for: We are honest (נכונים, Nekonim), we are righteous (צַדִּיקִים, Zaddikim), we are pure (טְהוֹרִים, Tehorim), we are submissive (דָּכְיָם, Dakkim), we are holy (קְדוֹשִׁים, Kedoshim).

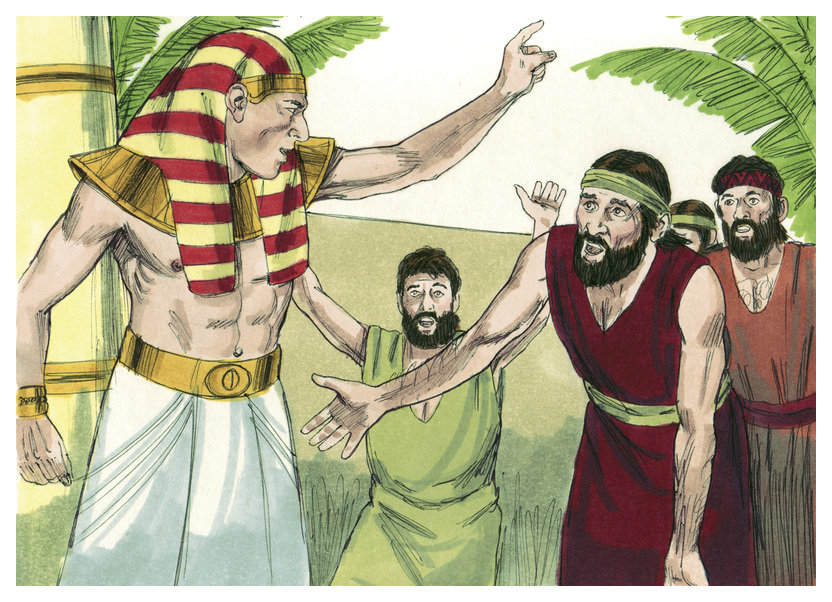
Judah asked, "How can we prove our innocence?" (1984 illustration by Jim Padgett, courtesy of Distant Shores Media/Sweet Publishing)

A Midrash read Judah's questions in Genesis 44:16, "What shall we speak or how shall we clear ourselves?" to hint to a series of sins. Judah asked, "What shall we say to my lord," with respect to the money that they retained after the first sale, the money that they retained after the second sale, the cup found in Benjamin's belongings, the treatment of Tamar in Genesis 38, the treatment of Bilhah in Genesis 35:22, the treatment of Dinah in Genesis 34, the sale of Joseph, allowing Simeon to remain in custody, and the peril to Benjamin. Reading the words of Genesis 44:16, "God has found out [מָצָא, mazah] the iniquity of your servants," Rabbi Isaac taught that the Creditor—God—had found (מָצָא, mazah) the opportunity to exact His debt. Rabbi Levi said like one who drains (מצוי, mizuy) a barrel of wine, leaving only its lees (God punished them to the last drop).

As Exodus 1:6 reports that "Joseph died, and all his brethren," the Rabbis concluded that Joseph died before his brothers. Rabbi Judah haNasi taught that Joseph died before his brothers because Joseph "commanded his servants the physicians to embalm his father" (as Genesis 50:2 reports). But the Rabbis taught that Jacob had directed his sons to embalm him, as Genesis 50:12 reports that "his sons did to him as he commanded them." According to the Rabbis, Joseph died before his brothers because nearly five times Judah said to Joseph, "Your servant my father, your servant my father" (four times himself in Genesis 44:24, 27, 30, and 31, and once together with his brothers in Genesis 43:48), yet Joseph heard it and kept silent (not correcting Judah to show humility to their father).

== In medieval Jewish interpretation ==
The parashah is discussed in these medieval Jewish sources:

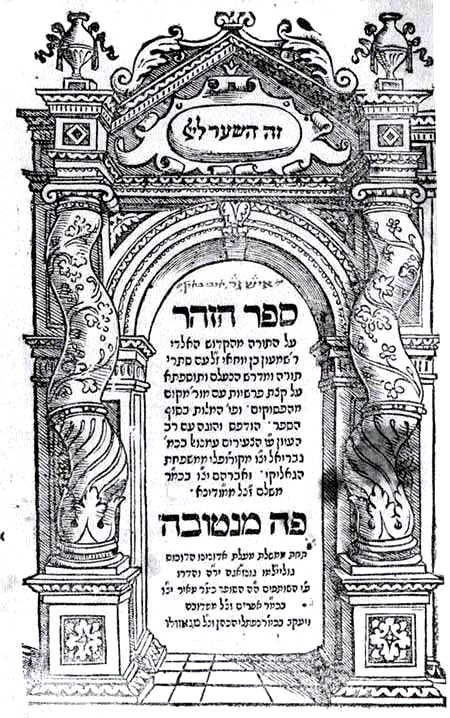
The title page of the Zohar

=== Genesis chapter 41 ===
The Zohar taught that a dream is a sixtieth part of prophecy, and so forms the sixth grade removed from prophecy, which is the grade of Gabriel, the supervisor of dreams. The Zohar taught that as a normal dream proceeds from that grade, there is not a dream that is not intermingled with it some spurious matter, so that it is a mixture of truth and falsehood. Hence, all dreams follow their interpretation, as Genesis 41:13 says, "And it came to pass, as he interpreted to us, so it was," for since the dream contains both truth and falsehood, the word has power over it, and therefore it is advisable that every dream should be interpreted sensibly.

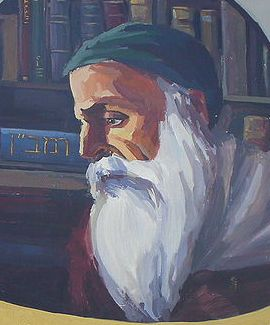
Naḥmanides

Reading the account of Pharaoh's dream in Genesis 41:2, Naḥmanides taught that the cows symbolized plowing, and the ears of corn symbolized the harvest, as Joseph said in Genesis 45:6, "there shall be neither plowing nor harvest." Thus he saw that the river would rise so slightly that there would be no plowing, and the little that would be planted would be burned because (in the words of Hosea 13:15) "an east wind shall come, the wind of the Lord coming up from the wilderness," and thus he saw (in the words of Genesis 41:6) "ears [of corn], thin and blasted with the east wind."

Reading Genesis 47:48, "And he gathered up all the food," Abraham ibn Ezra argued that one cannot read the word "all" literally, for if Joseph had taken all the food, then the Egyptians would have starved to death. Rather, Ibn Ezra argued that Joseph gathered as much of the food as he could without causing starvation.

Naḥmanides, however, disagreed, arguing that Joseph took control of all the food in Egypt and distributed quantities to the Egyptian people each year in accordance with their needs for sustenance. Joseph centralized the distribution of food so that people would not waste it. Naḥmanides noted that it is unclear whether Joseph paid money for the food from the royal treasury at a low price or Pharaoh took the food by force.

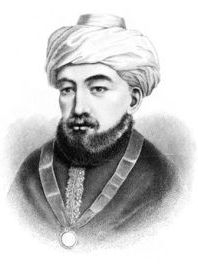
Maimonides

=== Genesis chapter 42 ===
Maimonides used Joseph's words in Genesis 42:15 to illustrate how God and God's life are one. Maimonides argued that were God to live as life is usually conceived, there would be more than one god—God and God's life—and this is not so. Maimonides taught that it is beyond human capacity to relate or to grasp this matter in its entirety. Thus in Genesis 42:15, Joseph says, "By the life (חֵי, chei) of Pharaoh," and in 1 Samuel 25:26, Abigail says to David, "By the life [חֵי, chei] of your soul," but 1 Samuel 25:26 does not say, "By the life [חֵי, chei] of God" but "As God lives" (חַי-יְהוָה, chai Adonai). This shows that God and God's life are not two separate things, as are the lives of living beings.

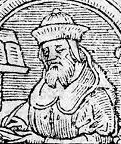
Rashi

=== Genesis chapter 43 ===
Following the Midrash, Rashi read the steward's words to the brothers in Genesis 43:23, "Your God, and the God of your father, has given you treasure," to mean that God gave them the money in their merit, and if their merit was insufficient, the God of their father Jacob gave it to them in the merit of their father. Similarly, Menaḥem ben Shlomo taught that the words "your God" signified that it was a reward for their fearing God, while the words "the God of your fathers" signified that it was a reward for Jacob's fearing God. Rashbam, however, read Genesis 43:23 to report that everyone knew that the brothers regularly benefitted from miracles. And David Kimhi (RaDaK) interpreted the steward to mean that if the brothers found the money in their sacks, it was a gift from heaven, comparable to if a human being had given them a treasure.

== In modern interpretation ==
The parashah is discussed in these modern sources:

=== Genesis chapters 37–50 ===
Donald Seybold schematized the Joseph narrative in the chart below, finding analogous relationships in each of Joseph's households.

The Joseph narrative
	At home		Potiphar's house		Prison		Pharaoh's court
Verses	Genesis 37:1–36	Genesis 37:3–33	Genesis 39:1–20	Genesis 39:12–41:14	Genesis 39:20–41:14	Genesis 41:14–50:26	Genesis 41:1–50:26
Ruler	Jacob		Potiphar		Prison-keeper		Pharaoh
Deputy	Joseph		Joseph		Joseph		Joseph
Other "subjects"	Brothers		Servants		Prisoners		Citizens
Symbols of position and transition		Long Sleeved Robe		Cloak		Shaved and changed clothes	
Symbols of ambiguity and paradox		Pit		Prison		Egypt	

Ephraim Speiser argued that in spite of its surface unity, the Joseph story, on closer scrutiny, yields two parallel strands similar in general outline, yet markedly different in detail. The Jahwist's version employed the Tetragrammaton and the name "Israel." In that version, Judah persuaded his brothers not to kill Joseph but sell him instead to Ishmaelites, who disposed of him in Egypt to an unnamed official. Joseph's new master promoted him to the position of chief retainer. When the brothers were on their way home from their first mission to Egypt with grain, they opened their bags at a night stop and were shocked to find the payment for their purchases. Judah persuaded his father to let Benjamin accompany them on a second journey to Egypt. Judah finally convinced Joseph that the brothers had really reformed. Joseph invited Israel to settle with his family in Goshen. The Elohist's parallel account, in contrast, consistently used the names "Elohim" and "Jacob." Reuben—not Judah—saved Joseph from his brothers; Joseph was left in an empty cistern, where he was picked up, unknown to the brothers, by Midianites; they—not the Ishmaelites—sold Joseph as a slave to an Egyptian named Potiphar. In that lowly position, Joseph served—not supervised—the other prisoners. The brothers opened their sacks—not bags—at home in Canaan—not at an encampment along the way. Reuben—not Judah—gave Jacob—not Israel—his personal guarantee of Benjamin's safe return. Pharaoh—not Joseph—invited Jacob and his family to settle in Egypt—not just Goshen. Speiser concluded that the Joseph story can thus be traced back to two once separate, though now intertwined, accounts.

John Kselman noted that as in the Jacob cycle that precedes it, the Joseph narrative begins with the deception of a father by his offspring through an article of clothing; the deception leads to the separation of brothers for 20 years; and the climax of the story comes with the reconciliation of estranged brothers and the abatement of family strife. Kselman reported that recent scholarship points to authorship of the Joseph narrative in the Solomonic era, citing Solomon's marriage to Pharaoh's daughter (reported in 1 Kings 9:16) as indicative of that era as one of amicable political and commercial relations between Egypt and Israel, thus explaining the positive attitude of the Joseph narrative to Egypt, Pharaoh, and Egyptians. Kselman argued that the Joseph narrative was thus not part of the Jahwist's work, but an independent literary work.

Gary Rendsburg noted that Genesis often repeats the motif of the younger son. God favored Abel over Cain in Genesis 4; Isaac superseded Ishmael in Genesis 16–21; Jacob superseded Esau in Genesis 25–27; Judah (fourth among Jacob's sons, last of the original set born to Leah) and Joseph (eleventh in line) superseded their older brothers in Genesis 37–50; Perez superseded Zerah in Genesis 38 and Ruth 4; and Ephraim superseded Manasseh in Genesis 48. Rendsburg explained Genesis's interest with this motif by recalling that David was the youngest of Jesse's seven sons (see 1 Samuel 16), and Solomon was among the youngest, if not the youngest, of David's sons (see 2 Samuel 5:13–16). The issue of who among David's many sons would succeed him dominates the Succession Narrative in 2 Samuel 13 through 1 Kings 2. Amnon was the firstborn, but was killed by his brother Absalom (David's third son) in 2 Samuel 13:29. After Absalom rebelled, David's general Joab killed him in 2 Samuel 18:14–15. The two remaining candidates were Adonijah (David's fourth son) and Solomon, and although Adonijah was older (and once claimed the throne when David was old and feeble in 1 Kings 1), Solomon won out. Rendsburg argued that even though firstborn royal succession was the norm in the ancient Near East, the authors of Genesis justified Solomonic rule by imbedding the notion of ultimogeniture into Genesis's national epic. An Israelite could thus not criticize David's selection of Solomon to succeed him as king over Israel, because Genesis reported that God had favored younger sons since Abel and blessed younger sons of Israel—Isaac, Jacob, Judah, Joseph, Perez, and Ephraim—since the inception of the covenant. More generally, Rendsburg concluded that royal scribes living in Jerusalem during the reigns of David and Solomon in the tenth century BCE were responsible for Genesis; their ultimate goal was to justify the monarchy in general, and the kingship of David and Solomon in particular; and Genesis thus appears as a piece of political propaganda.

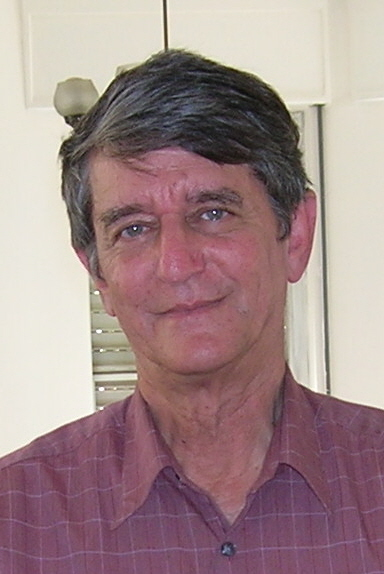
Kugel

Calling it "too good a story," James Kugel reported that modern interpreters contrast the full-fledged tale of the Joseph story with the schematic narratives of other Genesis figures and conclude that the Joseph story reads more like a work of fiction than history. Donald Redford and other scholars following him suspected that behind the Joseph story stood an altogether invented Egyptian or Canaanite tale that was popular on its own before an editor changed the main characters to Jacob and his sons. These scholars argue that the original story told of a family of brothers in which the father spoiled the youngest, and the oldest brother, who had his own privileged status, intervened to try to save the youngest when his other brothers threatened him. In support of this theory, scholars have pointed to the description of Joseph (rather than Benjamin) in Genesis 37:3 as if he were Jacob's youngest son, Joseph's and Jacob's references to Joseph's mother (as if Rachel were still alive) in Joseph's prophetic dream in Genesis 37:9–10, and the role of the oldest brother Reuben intervening for Joseph in Genesis 37:21–22, 42:22, and 42:37. Scholars theorize that when the editor first mechanically put Reuben in the role of the oldest, but as the tribe of Reuben had virtually disappeared and the audience for the story were principally descendants of Judah, Judah was given the role of spokesman and hero in the end.

Von Rad and scholars following him noted that the Joseph story bears the particular signatures of ancient Near Eastern wisdom literature. The wisdom ideology maintained that a Divine plan underlay all of reality, so that everything unfolds in accordance with a preestablished pattern—precisely what Joseph says to his brothers in Genesis 44:5 and 50:20. Joseph is the only one of Israel's ancestors whom the Torah (in Genesis 41:39) calls "wise" (חָכָם, chacham)—the same word as "sage" in Hebrew. Specialties of ancient Near Eastern sages included advising the king and interpreting dreams and other signs—just as Joseph did. Joseph displayed the cardinal sagely virtue of patience, which sages had because they believed that everything happens according to the Divine plan and would turn out for the best. Joseph thus looks like the model of an ancient Near Eastern sage, and the Joseph story looks like a didactic tale designed to teach the basic ideology of wisdom.

George Coats argued that the Joseph narrative is a literary device constructed to carry the children of Israel from Canaan to Egypt, to link preexisting stories of ancestral promises in Canaan to an Exodus narrative of oppression in and liberation from Egypt. Coats described the two principal goals of the Joseph story as (1) to describe reconciliation in a broken family despite the lack of merit of any of its members, and (2) to describe the characteristics of an ideal administrator.

=== Genesis chapter 41 ===
James Charlesworth reported the relation between the biblical narrative of Genesis 41:39–42:46 and the Ancient Greek History of Joseph. Its theological relevance is, among other elements, in that Joseph is called "king of the people" "foster father" or—more literally—"nourisher of Egyptians" and "savior," while there occurred many times the phrases "the God of Joseph" and "Joseph remembering Jacob," emphasizing the ancestral role of his forefathers and not to have since lent support to different traditions. Their union is similar to the Biblical expression "God of Abraham, Isaac, and Jacob," in Exodus 3:15. The History of Joseph is also related with Joseph and Aseneth and the Testament of the Twelve Patriarchs. In Joseph and Aseneth, Joseph is again referred as "king" (basileus), "giver of grain" (sinodotēs) and "savior" (sōter), in the same line of text (25:6), whereas the central theme of the Testament of the Twelve Patriarchs is "Joseph remembering Jacob," "while recounting the temptation by the wife of Potiphar."

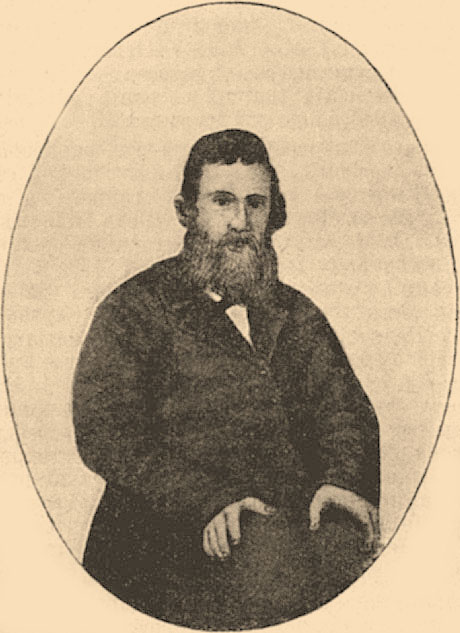
Malbim

=== Genesis chapter 43 ===
Malbim read the steward's words to the brothers in Genesis 43:23, "Your God, and the God of your father, has given you treasure," to mean that since the money being brought to Egypt from all over the world was only "a treasure"—that is, hidden away in the treasury until the time of the Exodus from Egypt, when it would become the Israelites'—the steward told the brothers that their treasure could remain in their sacks, for it made no sense to place it in Pharaoh's treasury, when it was destined for them in any case. Nahum Sarna wrote that the steward's reassuring reply was intelligible only on the assumption that he was privy to Joseph's scheme. His purpose was to lull the brothers into a false sense of relief. Robert Alter wrote that the steward dismissed the brothers' fears by introducing a kind of fairy tale explanation for the silver that they found in their bags. But Jon Levenson wrote that the steward sensed the hand of a beneficent Providence in the strange events.

=== Genesis chapter 44 ===
Speiser argued that the Jahwist's art rose to greatest heights in Genesis 44, which Speiser considered the real climax of the Joseph story. Speiser argued that the Jahwist was not concerned in the main with the poetic justice of Joseph's triumph over his brothers, or Joseph's magnanimity in forgiving them for tormenting him. Speiser thought that the Jahwist's interest reached much deeper to Joseph's gnawing doubts over whether his brothers had morally regenerated in the intervening years. To find the answer, Joseph resorted to an elaborate test, using his full brother Benjamin as bait in a trap. When Judah offered himself as a substitute, Joseph got his answer that the brothers had indeed reformed.

=== Genesis chapter 45 ===
Commenting on Genesis 45:5–8 and 50:19–20, Walter Brueggemann wrote that the Joseph story's theme concerns God's hidden and decisive power, which works in, through, and sometimes against human power. Calling this either providence or predestination, Brueggemann argued that God thus worked out God's purpose through and in spite of Egypt, and through and in spite of Joseph and his brothers.

Diagram of the documentary hypothesis

== In critical analysis ==
Some scholars who follow the documentary hypothesis find evidence of four separate sources in the parashah. Thus some scholars consider the bulk of chapters 42–44 (with some minor exceptions inserted by the Elohist, sometimes abbreviated E) to have been composed by the Jahwist (sometimes abbreviated J) who wrote possibly as early as the 10th century BCE. And these scholars attribute the bulk of chapter 41 to the Elohist, with insertions in Genesis 41:46 by the Priestly source (sometimes abbreviated P) who wrote in the 6th or 5th century BCE and a late Redactor (sometimes abbreviated R). For a similar distribution of verses, see the display of Genesis according to the Documentary Hypothesis at Wikiversity.

== Commandments ==
According to Maimonides and Sefer ha-Chinuch, there are no commandments in the parashah.

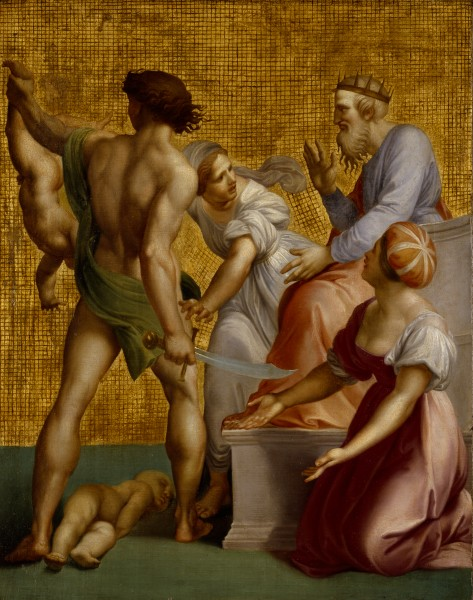
The Judgment of Solomon (late 18th-century painting by Giuseppe Cades)

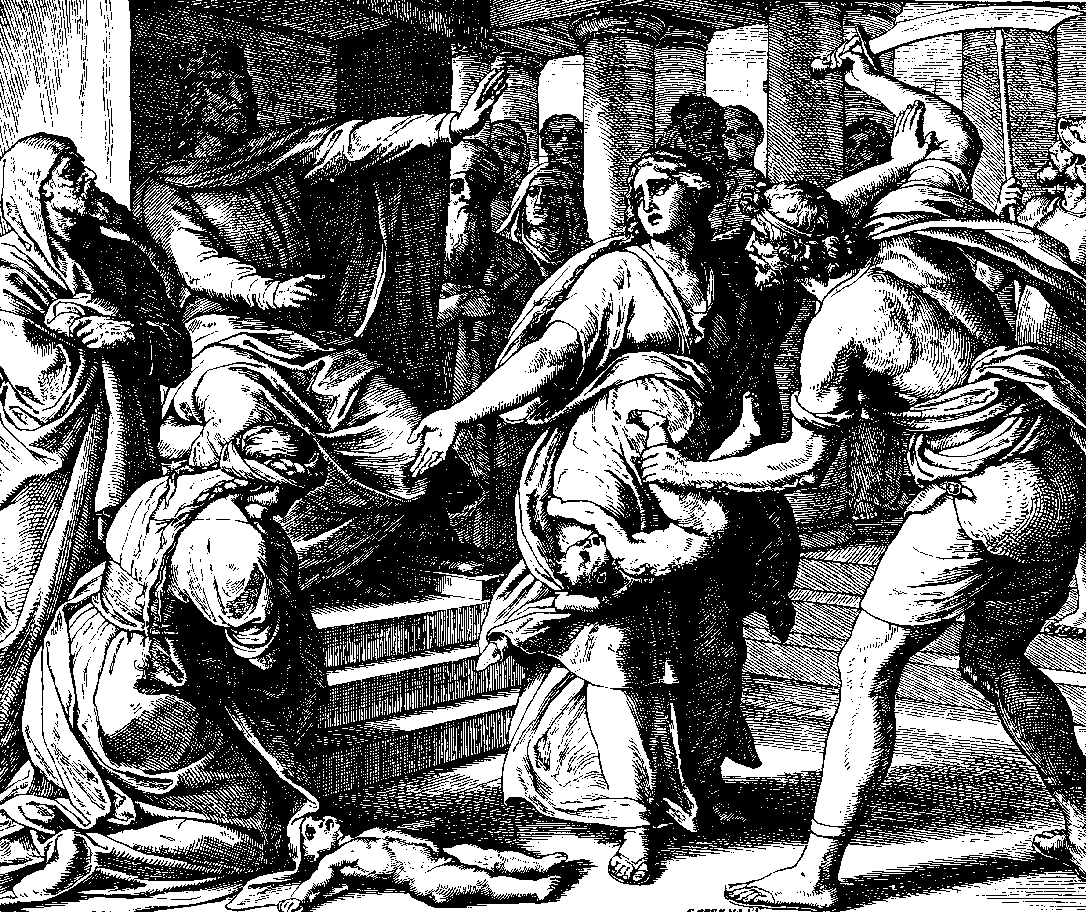
Solomon and the Two Women (woodcut by Julius Schnorr von Carolsfeld from the 1860 Die Bibel in Bildern)

== Haftarah ==
A haftarah is a text selected from the books of Nevi'im ("The Prophets") that is read publicly in the synagogue after the reading of the Torah on Sabbath and holiday mornings. The haftarah usually has a thematic link to the Torah reading that precedes it. The text read following Parashat Miketz varies according to different traditions within Judaism.

=== Generally ===
The haftarah for the parashah is 1 Kings 3:15–4:1. It is the story of King Solomon and the two women, one with a dead baby and one with a live baby. Joseph's rule of Egypt "becomes a precursor to wise Solomon's reign." Gregory Goswell argues that "in both cases it is wisdom that equips a man to exercise authority."

=== On Shabbat Chanukah ===
When Parashat Miketz coincides with the first Sabbath of Chanukah (as it did in 2015 and 2016), the haftarah is Zechariah 2:14–4:7. When Parashat Miketz coincides with the second Sabbath of Chanukah (as it did in 2009), the haftarah is 1 Kings 7:40–50. Additionally, when Parashat Miketz occurs on Rosh Chodesh (as it did in 2015 and 2019), some congregations read additional verses in honor of the new month. (The month of Tevet always begins during Chanukah.)
