= Asriel =

Biblical figure

In the Bible, Asriel (Hebrew: אַשְׂרִיאֵל, lit. 'Helped by God') is the son of Manasseh by his concubine, and founder of the clan of Asrielites.
