= Biblical Egypt =

Ancient Egypt as it is portrayed in the Bible

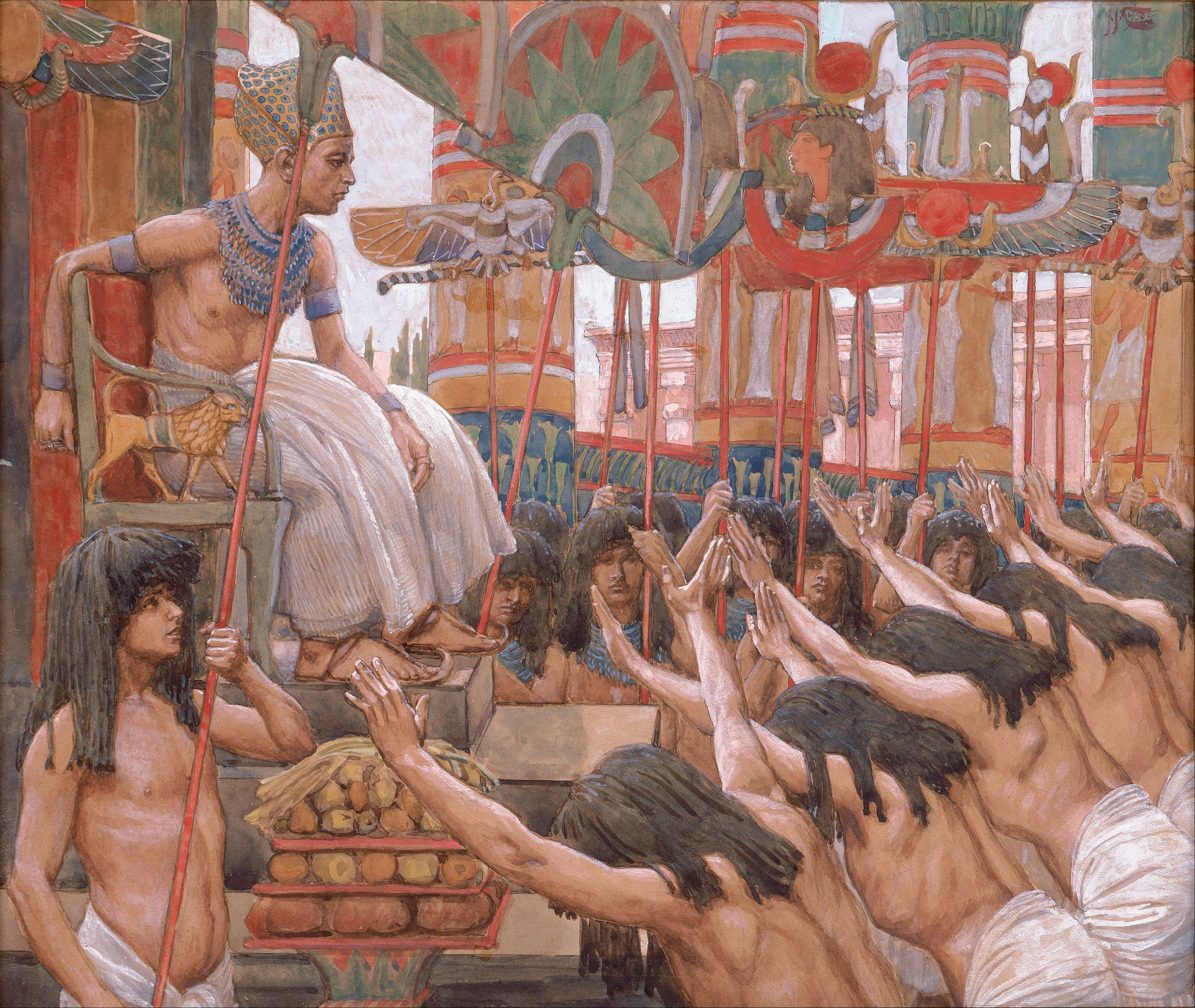
Joseph Dwelleth in Egypt painted by James Jacques Joseph Tissot, c. 1900

Biblical Egypt (Hebrew: מִצְרַיִם; Mīṣrāyīm), or Mizraim, is a theological term used by historians and scholars to differentiate between Ancient Egypt as it is portrayed in Judeo-Christian texts and what is known about the region based on archaeological evidence. Along with Canaan, Egypt is one of the most commonly mentioned locations in the Bible, and its people, the Egyptians (or Mitsri), play important roles in the story of the Israelites. Although interaction between Egypt and nearby Semitic-speaking peoples is attested in archaeological sources, they do not otherwise corroborate the biblical account.

The Book of Genesis and Book of Exodus describe a period of Hebrew slavery in Egypt, from their settlement in the Land of Goshen until their escape and the journey through the wilderness to Sinai. Based on the internal chronology of the Hebrew Bible, this would correspond roughly to the New Kingdom of Egypt during the Late Bronze Age.

In the Bible, a number of Jews took refuge in Egypt after the destruction of the Kingdom of Judah in 597 BC, and the subsequent assassination of the Jewish governor, Gedaliah (2 Kings 2 Kings 25:22–24, Book of Jeremiah Jeremiah 40:6–8). On hearing of the appointment, the Jewish population fled to Moab, Ammon, Edom and in other countries returned to Judah (Jeremiah 40:11–12). In Egypt, they settled in Migdol, Tahpanes, Noph, and Pathros (Jeremiah 44:1).

== Portrayal ==
=== In the Book of Genesis ===
In the Book of Genesis, Abraham and Sarah, along with their nephew Lot, were living in Canaan when a famine struck the area and so, the group travels to Egypt, where the Pharaoh, betaken by Sarah's beauty, made her his concubine, unaware that she is married because Abraham introduces himself as her brother, not her husband. Pharaoh gives number of gifts to Abraham in exchange for Sarah, in the form of livestock and slaves, one of whom is Hagar, who would later become Abraham's concubine and the mother of his firstborn son, Ishmael. For how long Sarah lives in Pharaoh's palace is not clear, though it is known that the LORD strikes Pharaoh and members of his household, save for Sarah, with plague, and Pharaoh deduces that Sarah is somehow the cause. Once learning that Sarah is Abraham's wife, not only his sister, he releases her to him and does not ask that Abraham return to him any of the livestock or slaves, and they leave Egypt without interruption, with significant wealth.

"And there was a famine in the land: and Abram went down into Egypt to sojourn there; for the famine was grievous in the land."

— KJV, Genesis 12:10

Later in the Book of Genesis is the story of Abraham and Sarah's great-grandson, Joseph, the eleventh son of Jacob and his first son with his second wife, Rachel. It is said that Jacob prefers Joseph over all of his other sons, causing tension between Joseph and his brothers, and so, they sell him into slavery, to a group of traveling Midianites headed for Egypt, where he's purchased by Potiphar, the captain of the guard. Joseph does well as a member of Potiphar's household, highly respected by his master, until Potipher's wife, scorned by Joseph, falsely accuses him of attempting to rape her and Joseph is imprisoned as a result. During his imprisonment, Joseph successfully interprets the dreams of two fellow prisoners, both servants of Pharaoh, one of whom is sentenced to death and the other who returns to Pharaoh's graces. Joseph begs of Pharaoh's cup-bearer, the prisoner who returns to Pharaoh's graces, to tell Pharaoh of him but he doesn't for some time, not until Pharaoh is troubled by dreams as the cup-bearer once was. Joseph reveals to Pharaoh that his dreams are signs of a great famine to come, and for his service, Pharaoh makes Joseph the vizier of Egypt and gives to him an Egyptian wife, Asenath. When famine strikes much of the region, not only Egypt, the Egyptians are so well prepared for it that they have a surplus of grain, which foreigners come to buy, among them, Joseph's brothers, who do not recognize him. Later, Joseph calls for all of Jacob's household, numbering seventy individuals, to come and live in Egypt with him, in the land of Goshen.

Then there passed by Midianites merchantmen; and they drew and lifted up Joseph out of the pit, and sold Joseph to the Ishmeelites for twenty pieces of silver: and they brought Joseph into Egypt.

— KJV, Genesis 37:28

=== In the Book of Exodus ===
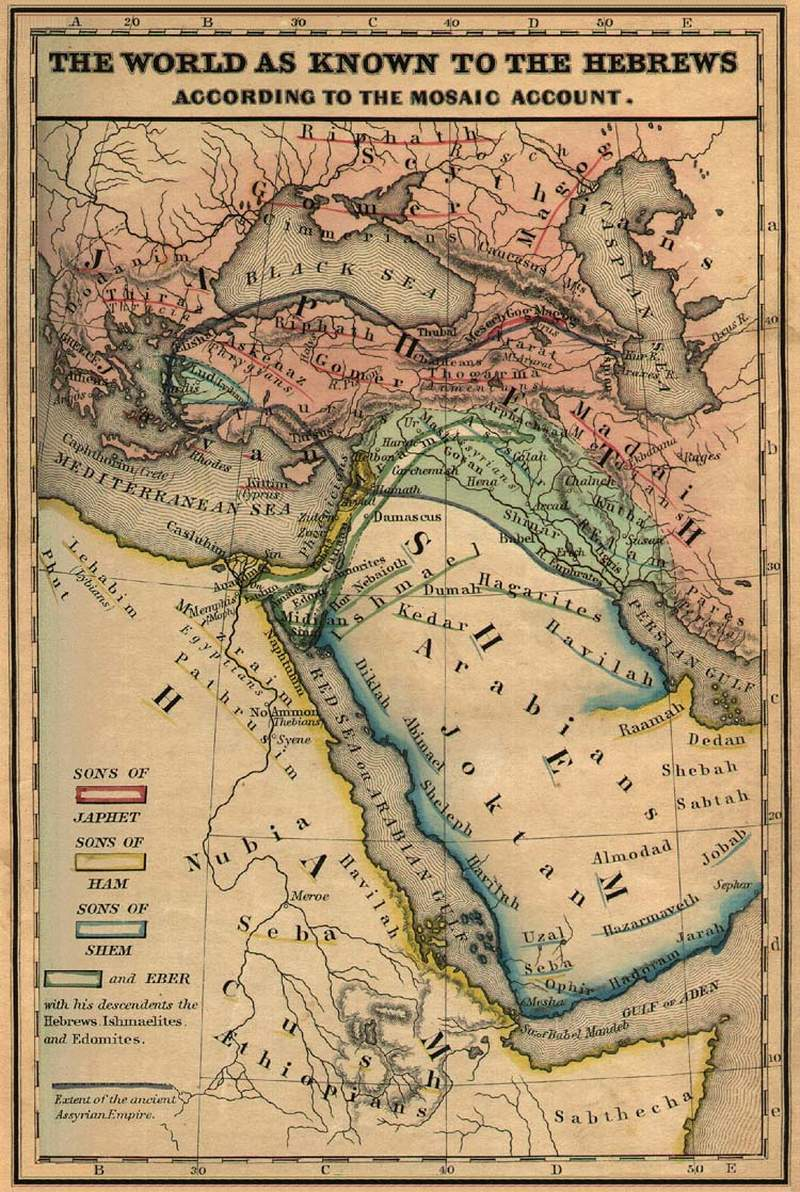
The world as known to the Hebrews according to the Mosaic account (1854 map), from the Historical Textbook and Atlas of Biblical Geography by Lyman Coleman.

In the Book of Exodus, the Israelites, descendants of Joseph and his brothers, are still living in the land of Goshen, and are now slaves, beaten, raped, and overworked by the Egyptian overlords under the reign of a new, tyrannical pharaoh. A great-great-grandson of Joseph's brother Levi, Moses, is born in a time when Pharaoh has decreed all newborn Hebrew males be slain and he is saved from Pharaoh's orders by Pharaoh's daughter, who rescues him from the Nile River and raises him as her own son. For a time, Moses leaves Egypt, to escape punishment in the death of an Egyptian man who had beaten an Israelite man, and goes into Midian, and makes a new life there, but returns to Egypt to free his brethren, chosen by the LORD to do so. There, with his brother, Aaron, and sister, Miriam, Moses demands the release of his people but Pharaoh refuses and for his stubbornness, he and his people suffer the Plagues of Egypt, famine, insect swarms, and notably, the deaths of all the firstborn Egyptians. Pharaoh is ultimately defeated by the LORD and the Israelites, along with liberated slaves of other nations kept by Pharaoh, cross the Red Sea, to go into the Promised Land.

And the Lord said unto Moses in Midian, Go, return into Egypt: for all the men are dead which sought thy life.

— KJV, Exodus: 4:19

=== In the Books of Kings ===
In the Books of Kings, Solomon, the king of Israel and the son of David, is said to have married Pharaoh's daughter, whose name is not provided, and received the city of Gezer as part of her dowry. Nothing else is written as to the personal nature of Pharaoh's daughter or about her relationship with Solomon. However, their relationship, and Solomon's willingness to take wives from other nations, in violation of laws against intermarriage in the Book of Deuteronomy, is thought to have contributed to his downfall. Solomon is said to have obliged his foreign wives and built temples for their gods in the land of Israel, and after his death at age sixty, relatively young for a biblical character, the tribes of Israel would not accept his heir, Rehoboam, son of the Ammonite woman Naamah, as ruler and so, the united monarchy of Israel failed.

And Solomon made affinity with Pharaoh king of Egypt, and took Pharaoh's daughter, and brought her into the city of David, until he had made an end of building his own house, and the house of the Lord, and the wall of Jerusalem round about.

— KJV, 1 Kings 3:1

Also in the Books of Kings is the story of Jeroboam, a former servant of Solomon who later conspired against him and, when his plotting was revealed, fled to Egypt, where Pharaoh Shishak protected him until Solomon's death. Though he is not identified in the Hebrew Bible, in the Septuagint, Jeroboam is said to have married a close female relative of Shishak, named Ano, who was the older sister of Tahpenes.

Solomon sought therefore to kill Jeroboam. And Jeroboam arose, and fled into Egypt, unto Shishak king of Egypt, and was in Egypt until the death of Solomon.

— KJV, 1 Kings 11:40

=== In the Books of Chronicles ===
In the Books of Chronicles, Rehoboam, son of Solomon and the first king of Judah, is attacked in the fifth year of his reign by an Egyptian pharaoh, whose personal name is given as Shishak, whom some historians have identified with Shoshenq I. It written that Rehoboam may have expected an attack, as he fortified fifteen major cities, among them Bethlehem and Hebron, but his efforts were not enough, as Shishak came with 1,200 chariots and 60,000 soldiers, not only Egyptians but also Lubims, Sukkites, and Kushites. As a result of his defeat, Judah became a vassal state, subordinate to Egypt. Shishak's invasion of Judah is portrayed as the wrath of the LORD, for the Israelites had forsaken the LORD and so, the LORD left them to the hands of Shishak. The Israelites humble themselves and the LORD prevents further destruction of their people but still orders that the Israelites become servants of Shishak.

And it came to pass, that in the fifth year of king Rehoboam Shishak king of Egypt came up against Jerusalem, because they had transgressed against the Lord.

— KJV, 2 Chronicles 12:2

=== In the Gospel of Matthew ===
In the Gospel of Matthew, part of the New Testament, it is said in Matthew 2:13-23 that Joseph, the earthly father of Jesus of Nazareth, is visited by an angel in a dream, who tells him to take Mary and Jesus and go to Egypt, to avoid Jesus being slain by King Herod I, called the Flight into Egypt. After Herod's death, they return to Nazareth.

And when they were departed, behold, the angel of the Lord appeareth to Joseph in a dream, saying, Arise, and take the young child and his mother, and flee into Egypt, and be thou there until I bring thee word: for Herod will seek the young child to destroy him.

— KJV, Matthew 2:13

=== Alternative biblical traditions of Israel in Egypt ===
Some biblical texts recall Israel’s time in Egypt without reference to slavery or oppression. For example, Ezekiel 20 presents Egypt as the place where God first revealed himself to Israel and chose them as his people, but does not mention slavery or suffering. Several legal texts also describe the Israelites in Egypt as sojourning strangers (גֵּרִים, gērîm) rather than slaves, calling for compassion toward foreigners on this basis (Deut. 10:19; Lev. 19:34). Deuteronomy 23:7–8 even commands that Egyptians not be abhorred, remembering them as hosts rather than oppressors. Prophetic oracles against Egypt in Isaiah 19, Jeremiah 46, and Ezekiel 29–32 likewise predict Egypt’s downfall without recalling the Israelites’ slavery there. According to biblical scholar Gili Kugler, these passages suggest that the slavery motif was not present in all early traditions of the exodus narrative. Instead, it emerged gradually within Israel’s cultural memory, shaped by political and theological needs in light of the tension with Babylon, and during the exile and its aftermath.

== Historical reality ==
According to Shaye J. D. Cohen, "Most Israelites were actually of Canaanite stock; their ancestors did not participate in an Exodus from Egypt; Israelites did not build the pyramids!!!". Indeed, the Bible never claims that the Israelites built the pyramids, nor are the pyramids mentioned in it.

According to Manfred Bietak:

Flavius Josephus (Contra Apionem I:26–31) identified the early Israelites and the Exodus with the Hyksos and their expulsion. Such an identification—which we have to reject on chronological grounds—may stem from the memories of a Western Semitic population living in the eastern Delta for quite a length of time, from the late 12th Dynasty (ca. 1830 BC) until the Ramesside Period.

== Notable Egyptians in the Bible ==
- Asenath, the wife of Joseph
- Bithiah, the adoptive mother of Moses
- The Egyptian, a Jewish eschatological prophet
- Hagar, the second wife of Abraham, former servant to Sarah, and mother of Ishmael
- Pharaoh's daughter, a wife of Solomon
- Potiphar, the master of Joseph
- Potiphar's wife, named Zulaikha in extrabiblical sources
- Potipherah, the father of Asenath, the wife of Joseph and mother of Manasseh and Ephraim
- Shishak, a pharaoh of Egypt

== See also ==
- History of the Jews in Egypt
- Joseph (Genesis)
- Merneptah Stele
- Pharaohs in the Bible
- Plagues of Egypt
- Babylonian captivity
