= Pirkei De-Rabbi Eliezer =

Aggadic-midrashic work

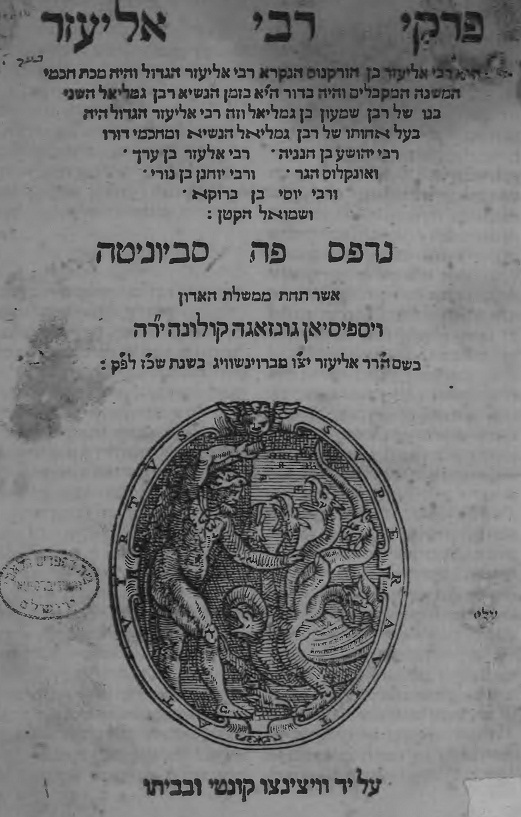
- Title page of the Sabbioneta edition from 1567 of "Pirkei de-Rabbi Eliezer"

Pirkei de-Rabbi Eliezer (Jewish Babylonian Aramaic: פִּרְקֵי דְּרַבִּי אֱלִיעֶזֶר, romanized: pirqe də-rabbi ʾeliʿezer, 'Chapters of Rabbi Eliezer'; abbreviated פדר״א, 'PRE') is an aggadic-midrashic work of Torah exegesis and retellings of biblical stories. Traditionally, the work is attributed to the tanna Eliezer ben Hurcanus and his school. Modern research suggests that the text is pseudepigraphic from the Geonic period of the eighth century, written in or near the Land of Israel.

== First chapters and attribution to Eliezer ==
Medieval scholarly texts also referred to Pirkei De-Rabbi Eliezer as Pirkei DeRabbi Eliezer HaGadol and as Baraita DeRabbi Eliezer. Whereas medieval scholars attributed the work to the Tanna Eliezer ben Hyrcanus, Abraham Zacuto wrote, "it is well known that although it is attributed to Rabbi Eliezer, it was written by later generations". Subsequently, research by Leopold Zunz claims that Pirkei DeRabbi Eliezer is an pseudepigraphic work. The first two chapters of the work are dedicated to the story of Eliezer ben Hyrcanus's approach to Torah, serving as an introduction to the work and providing background about the author. These chapters are derived from Avot de-Rabbi Natan, Version B, Chapter 13, and their originality in Pirkei DeRabbi Eliezer is a matter of scholarly debate. Many researchers speculate that these chapters are a later addition and not original to the Midrash.This hypothesis is based on evidence from the Cairo Geniza, where a list of books includes a manuscript in which the midrash begins at Chapter 3. Additionally, in one manuscript, the title of the midrash appears only in Chapter 3. According to this hypothesis, there is no internal evidence in the midrash itself to attribute it specifically to Eliezer, and the name Pirkei DeRabbi Eliezer was given because he is the first sage mentioned at the beginning of Chapter 3, "Rabbi Eliezer ben Hyrcanus opened...", as it was customary to name works after the first sage mentioned in them. Eliezer Treitl disagrees with this view and believes that the chapters should not be excluded from the canon for two reasons: These chapters appear in all the complete manuscripts of the work that exist; the language of the chapters slightly differs from their source in Avot DeRabbi Natan in a way that suits the unique language and stylistic nuances of Pirkei DeRabbi Eliezer.

== Time and place of the composition ==
The first scholar to establish the dating of the midrash was Leopold Zunz. Following his work, the widely accepted opinion in research is that the midrash was written around the eighth century. Zunz dates the book from the beginning to the middle of the eighth century. The evidence Zunz brings for this dating is that the author frequently refers in sermons to Ishmael and the kingdom of the children of Ishmael, and condemns their rule. Ishmael's name is interpreted at the beginning of Chapter 32 as: "And why is his name called Ishmael? Because in the future, the Holy One, blessed be He, will hear the cry of the people from what the children of Ishmael are destined to do in the land at the end of days." At the end of Chapter 30, the following apocalyptic vision appears,

Rabbi Ishmael says, Fifteen things the children of Ishmael are destined to do in the land at the end of days, and these are they: They will measure the land with ropes, make cemeteries for the resting place of sheep dung, measure in them and from them on the tops of mountains, increase lies, conceal the truth, distance law from Israel, increase sins in Israel, the worm will be as wool, the paper and pen will wither, the kingdom's rock will be rejected, they will rebuild ruined cities, clear roads, plant gardens and orchards, repair breaches in the walls of the Temple, build a structure in the sanctuary, and two brothers will stand over them as leaders in the end, and in their days the sprout of David (the Messiah) will stand.

According to Zunz, the "structure in the sanctuary" refers to the Dome of the Rock, which was built on the Temple Mount at the end of the seventh century. The rejection of the "kingdom's rock" refers to the minting of Muslim coins, which also occurred at the end of that century. Furthermore, the text bears a distinct similarity to the Geonic literature, a remarkable resemblance to the Targum Pseudo-Jonathan, and messianic sayings that set the expected year of redemption as 729.

Thus, the work was not written before the end of the seventh century. The opening passage of Chapter 3 appears in the letter of Pirqoi ben Baboi, who operated at the end of the eighth century or the beginning of the ninth century, indicating that the work was not written after the ninth century.

Regarding where the midrash was composed, extensive references to the rule of Ishmael indicate that the work was most likely composed in the Muslim-ruled Bilad al-Sham or its surroundings. Furthermore, in chapter 8, the work emphasizes the exclusive right of the "sages of the Land of Israel" to establish the calendar, stating that even shepherds and laypeople there are preferable to the righteous and prophets in the Diaspora, only the inhabitants of the Land of Israel have the right to establish the calendar. In addition, the text cites various customs of the Land of Israel. For example, the custom of defloration with a finger (mentioned in Chapter 16) is explicitly noted in the Book of Differences, as discussed by Mordecai Margalioth in 'Differences between Easterners and Residents of the Land of Israel'.

== Structure ==
In contrast to other earlier midrashic and classical rabbinic works, which considered collective creations, Pirkei DeRabbi Eliezer is considered the work of a single author. The work includes fifty-four chapters (or fifty-two chapters according to a slightly different division of the chapters, such as in the edition of Michael Higger and other manuscripts), in which the author expounds on the Torah portions from the days of creation to the history of Israel in the desert. The author also incorporates sermons and entire chapters on various portions from the books of the Nevi'im and the Ketuvim.

Pirkei DeRabbi Eliezer does not have a uniform and orderly structure. The first two chapters recount the life of Eliezer ben Hyrcanus. Chapter 3 contains homilies on the days of creation, followed by rewritten sections from the books of Genesis and Exodus. The last two chapters (53-54) form a unit dealing with slander, ending with homilies on the denunciation of the Israelites in the story of the bronze serpent and a final discourse that includes the parable of "The Diligent Workers and the Lazy Workers." The work rewrites and expands the books of Genesis and Exodus, sometimes in detail and sometimes briefly. The work does not cover all of Genesis and does not always follow the biblical order. Occasionally, the author arranges his homilies by thematic units and includes sections from the Nevi'im and the Ketuvim. For example, the first twenty chapters are dedicated to homilies on Genesis, and in the middle of chapter 22, he transitions to the parashah of Noach. However, he intersperses an entire chapter on the story of Jonah in the fish's belly (Chapter 10); and two complete chapters (16-17) focus on acts of kindness to bridegrooms and mourners. Later, when recounting the history of Abraham, the author does not follow the biblical order but prefers to arrange Abraham's history according to the tradition of the "Ten Trials" Abraham underwent. The final chapters of Genesis (Judah and Tamar, Joseph's revelation to his brothers, etc.) are omitted entirely, yet the author extensively incorporates the Book of Esther (Chapter 50).

Pirkei DeRabbi Eliezer differs from classical midrashic literature: it does not contain homilies on every verse (as found in works such as"Genesis Rabbah" and "Song of Songs Rabbah"), nor is it organized by the sequence of Torah or selected topics (like "Leviticus Rabbah" or "Pesikta de-Rav Kahana"). Although composed by a single author, the text exhibits various literary styles, leading scholars to debate its genre classification. Due to its extensive rewriting of biblical stories with midrashic expansions, abridgements, and changes in order, Joseph Heinemann and others consider it akin to the genre of "rewritten Bible" (a genre that includes some apocryphal books like "Jubilees" and the later "Book of Jasher"). Rina Drori disagrees with Heinemann, considering PRE as a standard midrashic work. She emphasizes its attribution of numerous homilies to various sages and the frequent use of the midrashic term "Shene'emar" (as it is said). Rachel Adelman of Hebrew College in Boston suggests viewing the work as a "narrative midrash."

=== Question of completeness ===
As it exists today, the midrash has an incomplete structure. Whether it was written this way or whether chapters were lost over the generations is a matter of debate. Chaim Palagi wrote about its conclusion, "It seems that up to here they found, and there were more chapters but they were not seen, and may God in His mercy enlighten our eyes with the light of His Torah, the Torah of life" (Par Echad on Pirkei DeRabbi Eliezer - Chapter 54). Leopold Zunz described the problem of the work's structure: first, the text (in the standard editions available to him at the time) is being cut off in the middle of an issue. Additionally, he pointed out two central themes, or foundational elements, on which the author bases various chapters of the work, which are missing at their ends:

At the beginning of Chapter 14, the author presents a tradition about God's descent to earth ten times, with these descents described subsequently, each in its place—but the last descent is the eighth (in Chapter 54), with the last two descents missing.

From the middle of the work, some chapters end with benedictions from the Amidah. The first benediction, "Shield of Abraham," appears at the end of Chapter 27, the second in the middle of Chapter 31, and so on. But the last benediction is "Healer of the Sick," with the other benedictions missing. From this, Zunz hesitantly suggested the hypothesis that the work did not survive.

David Luria supported Zunz's hypothesis and, in the introduction to his commentary, provided over a dozen citations from PRE in the writings of medieval sages that are not found in the existing work – indicating that the work was once complete with additional chapters. According to D. Luria, the seven chapters of the Rabbi Eliezer that were added to Seder Eliyahu Rabbah originated from this work. He bases this suggestion on the statements of Eleazar of Worms and the author of Yalkut Shimoni, who quotes from these seven chapters, sometimes referring to them as "PRE" (Pirkei DeRabbi Eliezer). This view of Zunz and Luria that chapters and parts of the original work were lost over the generations, is very common in research. Eliezer Treitl disagrees, arguing that the work as it exists today was completed by the author in this form, and that there were never additional chapters. According to Treitl, a comprehensive examination of all the manuscripts of Pirkei DeRabbi Eliezer and tracking the unique style of the work challenges the hypotheses of Zunz and Luria, and a thorough examination of the citations cited by Luria shows that most of them are not actual quotations from Pirkei DeRabbi Eliezer. Zunz's claim that the work ends in the middle of a sermon is based on a corrupted edition, printed from a manuscript with a large segment at the end missing. The segment is found in full all other complete manuscripts along with additional sermons. Regarding Zunz's claim about the missing "central themes," Treitl points out that two benedictions are also missing in the middle – the benediction of forgiveness and the benediction of redemption – making it more likely that the author himself did not complete his work. Further evidence is the benediction, "On the righteous converts" and "...who gathers the dispersed of His people Israel," found already in Chapter 10, seems out of context. The benediction should have been placed much later than the last benediction in the work, which suggests that the author planned a longer work and had already prepared this chapter in advance. However, when he could not complete his original plan, he attached the chapter to the most suitable place. Treitl argues that a hint to the claim that the work remained incomplete from its inception can be found in the sermon that concludes the work:

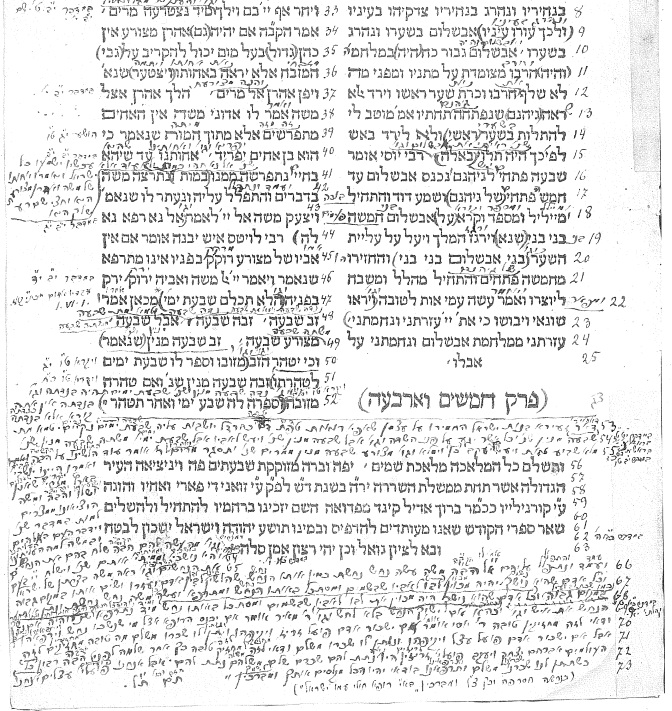
Photograph of the personal copy of Pirkei De-Rabbi Eliezer (PRE) belonging to Chaim Meir Horowitz, which is the second Venice edition with variant readings and additions from manuscripts. In the densely packed margins at the bottom of the page, it can be seen that Horowitz completed the missing parts according to manuscripts (Wertheimer first published the page and is included in the 2005-2006 edition)

Rabbi Yossi says if a person hires a diligent worker and pays him and gives him his full wage, what good is held for this? But if a person hires a lazy worker and pays him and gives him his full wage – surely this one is held in great esteem. So said Solomon before the Holy One, blessed be He: Master of the Universe, Abraham, Isaac, and Jacob were diligent workers, you gave them their full wage – you gave them from their own. But we are lazy workers, and when you heal us, give us our full wage, and surely everyone will praise you and bless you and say to you: Blessed are you, Lord, who heals the sick of His people Israel.

According to Treitl, the conclusion of the work with this sermon is no accident, but rather the author is hinting to the reader that he was unable to complete the work; the work is ended, but not finished.

== Names of the sages in the work ==
Many homilies in the work are attributed to Eliezer and various sages, some of whom lived much later than Eliezer ben Hyrcanus. David Luria, who sought to defend the traditional view attributing the work to Eliezer, argued that most of the names appearing as amoraim are actually tannaim with similar names. In his introduction and in numerous places in the body of his commentary, Luria strives to prove and justify the traditional view that sees PRE as a fundamentally tannaitic work. He attributed the work to Eliezer's academy, which operated in the generations following him, and explained the later sages' names as later additions to the work. However, Albeck strongly opposes this. Luria's view is not accepted in scholarly research. Since Leopold Zunz, these attributions are considered pseudepigraphical. For example, in Chapter 43, the midrash extensively discusses the deeds of Resh Lakish and his companions and his repentance, placing words of praise for Resh Lakish in the mouth of the tanna Ben Azzai, who lived three generations earlier. Another example: Levitas of Yavneh is mentioned once in the Mishnah (Avot) and no other Talmudic source, yet the midrash attributes several homilies to him that earlier sources attribute to other sages.

== Non-Talmudic literature ==
The work draws its traditions from Talmudic sources, such as the Mishnah and Palestinian aggadic midrashim, which RDL cites in his commentary, almost on every page. Although primarily Palestinian, the work also incorporates material from the Babylonian Talmud in certain sections. One of its unique features of this work is its extensively uses non-Talmudic literature.

The work includes aggadic traditions descending from Second Temple period apocryphal literature. For example, in Chapter 22, Pirkei DeRabbi Eliezer identifies the "sons of God" mentioned in Genesis 6:1 with the angels who fell from heaven, as commonly found in apocryphal literature (1 Enoch). This interpretation is contrary to the view of the sages, who vehemently opposed this interpretation. Albeck provides many examples of this connection in his additions to Zunz's work.

The legend about the expulsion of Hagar and Ishmael (Chapter 30) has a clear Islamic background, as evidenced by the names of the women Aisha (the name of Muhammad's wife) and Fatima (the name of Muhammad's daughter), attributed by the author to Ishmael's wives. This legend has Islamic parallels, and the prevailing opinion is that its source is Islamic. Aviva Shosman suggests the story's origin is Jewish.

There are many parallels, sometimes to the point of literal similarity, between Pirkei DeRabbi Eliezer and the Aramaic Targum Jonathan to the Torah (a translation composed in the same period and region as Pirkei DeRabbi Eliezer), first noted by Zunz. David Luria believed that the Targum depends on our work and draws from it. Avigdor Shinan also holds this view, but Treitl shows that there are also opposite case where Pirkei DeRabbi Eliezer depends on the Targum.

The work also has ties to early Palestinian piyyut (liturgical poetry), evident in both shared traditions and linguistic similarities. For instance, the tradition mentioned in Pirkei DeRabbi Eliezer (Chapter 46) that one should stand on their feet on Yom Kippur because Israel are similar to angels on this day is close to the traditions of poets Yannai and Eleazar Kalir.

== External halakha and custom ==
At times, the work offers traditions not found in rabbinic halakha sources. One such example is its use of homilies to criticize the new ruling power—Islam—through biblical allusions that criticize Ishmael. The fact that Ishmael was born before Abraham was circumcised serves as a tool for criticism, as seen in the homily on Leviticus 19:23 in Chapter 29:

Only the grapevine is meant by 'tree'; if they do not cut off the foreskin of the tree, all its fruits are stunted and unsightly, and its wine is disqualified from the altar. But if they cut off the foreskin of the tree, all its fruits are good-looking, and its wine is chosen for the altar. So, too, with our father Abraham: before he was circumcised, the fruit he produced was not good in deeds and was disqualified from the altar. But after he was circumcised, the fruit he produced was good in deeds and his wine was chosen for the altar, as it says 'and wine for the drink offering' (Numbers 15:5).

Thus, the author explains why Isaac was chosen to be bound on the altar and not Ishmael, since Ishmael is "the son of the foreskin" (as explicitly stated in Chapter 31), meaning he was born to Abraham while he was still uncircumcised. This interpretation is very unusual and is not found in any Talmudic literature. According to this text, the prohibition of the "foreskin" of the tree means that the fruits of the tree must be cut off in the first three years; this does not align with rabbinic law but matches the tradition found in Philo of Alexandria and the Karaite sage Yefet ben Ali.

In addition to the regular discourses, which form the main structure of the work, Pirkei DeRabbi Eliezer also includes chapters on astronomy and the determination of the Hebrew calendar. PRE is the first Hebrew work to mention (In Chapter 8) the 19-year intercalation cycle. Halakha and customs are significant elements of the work. The author often attributes various customs to biblical times, concluding with phrases like "Thus, the sages ordained..." In Chapter 16, Pirkei DeRabbi Eliezer describes Isaac's actions and marriage to Rebecca: Ishmael says, Abraham said to his son Isaac, this servant is suspected of transgressions and deceit, as it is said, "Canaan has dishonest scales in his hand; he loves to defraud" (Hosea 12:8). Beware lest he touches the conduit. Instead, bring the girl into the tent, and examine her virginity with your finger. If she is pure in her virginity, she is yours by divine decree. Isaac brought her into the tent, examined her virginity with his finger, showed it to Abraham, and then married her, as it is said, "Isaac brought her into his mother Sarah's tent" (Genesis 24:67). And so Israel used to examine virginity with the finger. In this folktale, the author seeks to reinforce the local custom of verifying virginity with a finger.

The custom of Elijah's chair at the circumcision ceremony is first mentioned in Pirkei DeRabbi Eliezer at the end of Chapter 29: God said to Elijah,"You are always zealous; you were zealous at Shitim (The community settlement in southern Israel) over immorality... and now you are zealous here. By your life, Israel will not perform circumcision until you see it with your own eyes." Hence, the sages ordained that an honorable seat be made for the angel of the covenant.

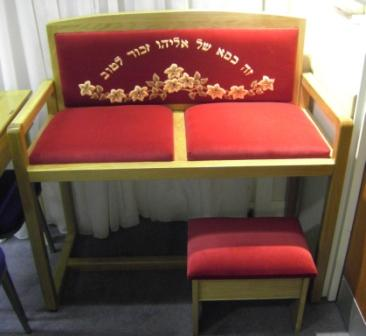
Chair of Elijah, a custom originating from the Pirkei De-Rabbi Eliezer

Additional customs originating from Pirkei DeRabbi Eliezer and incorporated into halachic literature include: standing throughout Yom Kippur, looking at fingernails during Havdalah, mourners attending the synagogue on Shabbat, a groom not going to the market alone, and blowing the shofar in Elul.

== Legends in the work ==
Below are some examples of the traditions from Pirkei DeRabbi Eliezer that demonstrate its approach and unique style.

The Bible does not recount the fate of Dinah, Jacob's daughter, after her rape. The work fills in this gap, explaining that Joseph did not marry an Egyptian woman but rather a relative—Asenath, Dinah's daughter. Chapter 38 begins:

And went into the house and leaned his hand on the wall, and a serpent bit him" (Amos 5:19) – When Jacob returned to his inheritance in the land of Canaan, the serpent bit him. And who is the serpent? This refers to Shechem son of Hamor. Jacob's daughter sat in tents and did not go outside. What did Shechem son of Hamor do? He brought girls playing outside with tambourines, and Dinah went out to see the daughters of the land playing, and he kidnapped and slept with her, and she conceived and bore Asenath. The Israelites wanted to kill her, saying: Now the whole land will say there is a house of prostitution in Jacob's tents. What did Jacob do? He brought a golden plate with the holy name written on it, hung it around her neck, and sent her away. Everything is revealed before the Holy One, and the angel Michael descended and brought her to Egypt to Potiphar's house, as Asenath was destined for Joseph as a wife. Potiphar's wife was barren and raised her as a daughter. When Joseph came to Egypt, he took her as his wife, as it says, 'And he gave him Asenath daughter of Potiphera, priest of On, as a wife' (Genesis 41:45).

The work also frequently identifies family relationships between characters mentioned in separate biblical contexts. For example, according to the work, the Witch of Endor consulted by Saul was the mother of Abner, son of Ner; the woman from Sarepta in Elijah's story was the mother of Jonah; the Shulamite woman in Elisha's story was the sister of Abishag, who served David; and the man who revived after touching Elisha's bones was Shallum ben Tikvah, husband of the prophet Huldah and the father of Hanamel, Jeremiah's cousin.

Another typical legend in the work tells of Abraham's visits to his son Ishmael after being forced to send him away at Sarah's command:

Ishmael sent and took a wife from the daughters of Moab, and her name was Ayesha. After three years, Abraham wanted to see his son Ishmael and swore to Sarah that he would not dismount from his camel where Ishmael lived. He arrived at midday and found Ishmael's wife. He asked her, "Where is Ishmael?" She said, "He and his mother have gone to bring fruits and dates from the wilderness." He said, "Give me a little bread and water, for I am weary from the desert journey." She replied, "I have neither bread nor water." He said, "When Ishmael returns, tell him an old man from Canaan came to see you and said, 'Change the threshold of your house, for it is not good for you.'" When Ishmael returned, she told him these words, and a wise son is half wise, so Ishmael understood and sent her away. His mother took a wife for him from her father's house, and her name was Fatima. After three years, Abraham came again to see Ishmael and swore to Sarah as before. He arrived at midday and found Ishmael's wife. He asked her, "Where is Ishmael?" She replied, "He and his mother are grazing the camels in the wilderness." He said, "Give me a little bread and water, for I am weary from the desert journey." She brought it to him. Abraham prayed before the Holy One for his son, and Ishmael's house was filled with all good things. When Ishmael returned, she told him what had happened, and Ishmael knew that his father's mercy was still upon him, as it says, "As a father has compassion on his children" (Psalms 103:13).

The work also identifies names for anonymous biblical characters. For example, it names Abraham's mother as Athray (contrary to the Talmud, which names her Amatlai), Lot's wife as Irit, Lot's daughter as Peletit, and the sages who taught the Samaritans the "laws of the God of the land" as Rabbi Dosetai and Rabbi Yannai.

Several legends from Pirkei DeRabbi Eliezer became particularly well-known through Rashi's commentary on the Bible:

- Sarah's death was caused by Samael telling her about the binding of Isaac, and her soul flew away (Chapter 32).
- The reason Rebecca asked Jacob to bring two goat kids to prepare a meal for Isaac: "Was Isaac's meal really two goat kids? Rather, one was to be a Passover sacrifice, and the other to make delicacies" (Chapter 32).
- The Jebusites who controlled Jerusalem in David's time were descendants of the Hittites, and the covenant Abraham made with them when purchasing the Cave of Machpelah prevented the city's conquest in the Judges' period (chapter 36; mentioned in Rashi on Deuteronomy 12:17).
- When Jonah's ship was storm-tossed, the sailors saw other ships in calm waters, while the sea around them was turbulent (Chapter 9).

Maimonides dedicated an entire chapter in The Guide for the Perplexed to discussing a legend from Pirkei DeRabbi Eliezer, which he considered the most puzzling statement in all Jewish literature: "From the light of His garment... From where was the earth created? From the snow beneath His throne of glory." Maimonides struggled philosophically to understand why the author posited that the world was created from a preexisting substance.

== Style and language ==
The work's style is unique, incorporating both biblical phrasing and the classical piyyut style, as Luria repeatedly demonstrates. Here are some examples:

- The term "helper" (עזר) is used to refer to a woman. For example, when listing the four couples buried in the Cave of Machpelah: "Adam and his helper, Abraham and his helper, Isaac and his helper, Jacob and his helper" (end of Chapter 20).
- Abraham's ten trials are referred to in the singular "נס": "the first נס; the second נס."
- A cemetery is called a בית מלון "house of lodging" (and the poet Jose ben Jose uses a similar term); after Adam was expelled from Eden, the text states: "Adam sat and pondered in his heart, and said, 'For I know you will bring me to death and the house appointed for all living' (Job 30:23), so while I am still alive, I will build myself a house of lodging for my resting place."
- The PRE sometimes uses synonymous phrases as the poets did. For example, instead of עץ (tree) in biblical language or אילן in rabbinic language, it prefers to say: עץ-אילן: "A tree-tree bears fruit after its kind" (Chapter 5).

Some other examples of unique language usages not found in other midrashic literature include the term "and not only that" often used in the work to mean "another matter" or "some say," rather than its usual meaning of adding something new to what was previously mentioned. In midrashic literature, the word "nimim" is used for violin strings, but the author of Pirkei DeRabbi Eliezer calls them "navalim"; in Chapter 19, he notes that David's violin had ten "navalim," meaning strings.

The work describes the revelation at Mount Sinai in this lofty style (Chapter 41):

I am the Lord your God who brought you out - The first voice went forth; the heavens and the earth shook; the seas and rivers fled; the mountains and hills trembled; and all the trees bowed; the dead in Sheol came to life and stood on their feet.

== Distribution ==
Pirkei DeRabbi Eliezer is one of the most widespread midrashic works. PRE is frequently quoted in the writings of Geonim and Rishonim from all Jewish communities. PRE has been issued in numerous manuscripts and print editions, and several customs practiced today originate from this work. Rabbeinu Tam acknowledged the work's importance in relation to customs, considering it a fundamental ancient source upon which "many customs are based."

"Pirkei DeRabbi Eliezer" stands out among midrashic works due to its numerous manuscripts. The Institute of Microfilmed Hebrew Manuscripts in Jerusalem catalogs over a hundred manuscripts of the work, some complete and some partial. Photographs of many of these manuscripts are available there. In addition, a few Geniza fragments of PRE have survived. The many manuscripts were first examined by Lewis M. Barth, and the numerous variations between different manuscripts led him to speculate that we may have similar but not identical works gathered under the same name. According to Eliezer Treitl's philological research, the main manuscripts of the work—totaling over two dozen—are divided into three textual branches, with additional manuscripts whose connection to the different branches is unclear. Many of the manuscripts have little textual value as they were copied from various printed editions and other manuscripts.

== Editions and translations ==
Since the invention of printing, Pirkei DeRabbi Eliezer has been published over fifty times as can be seen, for example, in the catalog of the National Library of Jerusalem. PRE was first printed in Constantinople in 1514, followed by Venice in 1544 with corrections of some errors from the first print. All subsequent editions are based on the Venice edition. Modern prints suffer from heavy censorship (even the new edition by Zikhron Aharon in 2005-2006 contains censored errors).

Michael Higger published an edition of PRE in the journal "Chorev," including variants from several manuscripts. However, significant errors occurred in Chapters 35-36 due to incorrect page order in the manuscript used. An electronic edition based on a Yemenite manuscript, with corrections from other Yemenite manuscripts, is available in the Historical Dictionary Project of the Academy of the Hebrew Language.

PRE was translated into Latin by Willem Henricus Vorstius in 1644. An English translation based on a manuscript was published in 1916 by Gerald Friedlander. This edition which included some variant readings, commentary, and extensive references to sources and parallels from apocryphal literature. Marc-Alain Ouaknin and Eric Smilévitch translated PRE into French in 1983. Miguel Perez Fernandez translated it into Spanish in 1984. In 2004, a German translation of PRE was published in Berlin by Dagmar Börner-Klein.

== Commentaries ==
The first commentary written for Pirkei DeRabbi Eliezer was by Jedaiah ben Abraham Bedersi, published in the Zikhron Aharon edition, Jerusalem 2005. Other notable commentaries include:

- Judah ben Nissim with glosses by Isaac ben Samuel of Acre, published by Joseph Fenton.
- Don Isaac Abrabanel wrote an extensive commentary on chapter 29, discussing the Covenant of the Pieces and the four kingdoms, as part of his work "Yeshuot Meshicho."
- "Beit HaGadol - Bi'ur Maspik" by Abraham Aaron Broda, published in Vilna in 1838.
- "Midrash Tanaim" by Ze'ev Wolf Einhorn, published in 1839.
- The most comprehensive commentary is by David Luria, published in Warsaw in 1852, which includes extensive discussions on sources and parallels from the vast Talmudic literature.
- Benjamin Diskin on chapter 6.
- Elijah Hayitmeri's explanations on instances where "and not only that" appears.
- Haim Palachi of İzmir in 1880.
- Jacob Emden's glosses, featured in the Zikhron Aharon edition, Jerusalem 2005.

== Bibliography ==
- Jacob Elbaum (1992): "The Style, Motif, and Subject in Pirkei DeRabbi Eliezer," Jerusalem Studies in Jewish Folklore, 13-14, pages 99-126 (in Hebrew)
- Joseph Heinemann (1974): "Legends and their Histories," Jerusalem: Keter, from page 181 (in Hebrew)
- Solomon Aharon Wertheimer (1968): "The Last Chapter of Pirkei DeRabbi Eliezer," in "Batei Midrashot," new edition, Jerusalem, pages 238-243 (in Hebrew)
- Eliezer Treitl (2012): "Pirkei DeRabbi Eliezer: Text, Editing, and Manuscript Synopsis," Yad Yitzhak Ben-Zvi, Jerusalem (in Hebrew)
- Adiel Kadari (2016): "Blessing and Midrash: Liturgical Texts as a Key to Interpretation in Pirkei DeRabbi Eliezer," in "Prayer in Israel: New Aspects," edited by A. Ehrlich, Beer-Sheva, pages 327-340 (in Hebrew)
- Aviva Shosman (1980): "The Jewish Origin and Purpose of the Story of Abraham's Visits to Ishmael," Tarbiz 49, pages 325-345 (in Hebrew)
- Rachel Adelman (2009): "The Return of the Repressed: Pirkei DeRabbi Eliezer and the Pseudepigrapha," Leiden: Brill
- Robert Hayward (1991): "Pirkei DeRabbi Eliezer and Targum Pseudo Jonathan," Journal of Jewish Studies, 42, pages 215-246
- Bernhard Heller (1925): "Muhammedanisches und Antimuhammedanisches in den Pirke Rabbi Eliezer," Monatsschrift für Geschichte und Wissenschaft des Judentums, 69, pages 47-54
- Steven Daniel Sacks (2009): "Midrash and Multiplicity: Pirkei DeRabbi Eliezer and the Renewal of Rabbinic Interpretive Culture" General Studies
- Rina Drori (1988): "The Early Contacts of Hebrew Literature with Arabic Literature in the Tenth Century," Tel Aviv: The Israeli Institute for Poetics and Semiotics (in Hebrew)
