= Potiphar =

Biblical character

< ra pA di pA >
Potiphar
pꜣ-dj-pꜣ-rꜥ
in hieroglyphs

Potiphar (/ˈpoʊtiːfɑːr/; Hebrew: פּוֹטִיפַר/פּוֹטִיפָר, romanized: Pōṭīp̄ar/Pōṭīp̄ār; from Late Egyptian: pꜣ-dj-pꜣ-rꜥ, lit. 'he whom Ra gave') is a figure in the Hebrew Bible, who features as the captain of pharaoh's guard who purchases Joseph as a slave, and in the Quran. His name possibly indicates the same figure as Potiphera (Hebrew: פוטיפרע).

== Biblical narrative ==
Potiphar is the captain of the guard for a pharaoh, who has purchased Joseph as a slave from Midianite or Ishmaelite traders, and, impressed by his intelligence, makes him the master of his household. God blessed Potiphar's household and property, "house and field", on account of Joseph.

Potiphar's wife, who was known for her infidelities, took a liking to Joseph and attempted to seduce him. When Joseph refused her advances and ran off, leaving his outer garment in her hands, she retaliated by falsely accusing him of trying to rape her, and Potiphar had Joseph imprisoned.

== Islam ==
The story is related in Quran 12:21–35. The Aziz (an honorific referring to Potiphar) purchases Joseph and proposes to adopt him. When Joseph reaches a mature age, the Aziz's wife attempts to seduce him, but he resists her seduction. To avoid blame, she instead accuses Joseph of attempting to rape her. However, since she had ripped his shirt from behind while he ran away, Joseph's innocence was proven to the Aziz, who condemns his wife. Therefore, the immoral conduct of the Aziz's wife becomes known in the city. On seeing Joseph's beauty, chaos is caused amongst the wives of other Egyptian chiefs, which prompts the Aziz to imprison him.

== Historicity ==
Tying Potiphar or Joseph accurately to a particular pharaoh or period is difficult. According to the Jewish calendar, Joseph was purchased in the year 2216, which is 1544 BC, at the end of the Second Intermediate Period or the very beginning of the New Kingdom.

According to the documentary hypothesis, the story of Potiphar and his wife is drawn from the Yahwist source and stands in the same place as the stories of the butler and the baker and Pharaoh's dreams stand in the Elohist text. H. E. Ryle attributes Genesis 37:36 (which refers to Midianites) to the Elohist source.

== Interpretation ==
What happened to Potiphar after this incident is unclear; some sources identify him as Potipherah, an Egyptian priest whose daughter, Asenath, marries Joseph. The false accusation made by Potiphar's wife plays an important role in Joseph's narrative because, had he not been imprisoned, he would not have met the fellow prisoner who introduced him to Pharaoh.

Likewise, the fate of Potiphar's wife is unclear, but some sources say she was stricken with illness.

The medieval Sefer HaYashar, a commentary on the Torah, gives Potiphar's wife's name as Zuleikha, as do many Islamic traditions - hence the Persian poem, titled Yusuf and Zulaikha, which also has Persian miniatures of the couple, from Jami's Haft Awrang ("Seven thrones"). A similar story is found in the Egyptian Tale of Two Brothers, where the wife of Anpu tries to seduce her husband's brother, Bata.

Rachel Adelman suggests that both Potiphar and his wife were sexually attracted to Joseph and tried to use him for their own purposes. But Potiphar's attempts were thwarted via castration, according to Talmudic legend. She believes the story is a criticism of Jewish assimilation, since foreigners like Potiphar and his wife would seduce Jews to sin.

== Cultural references ==
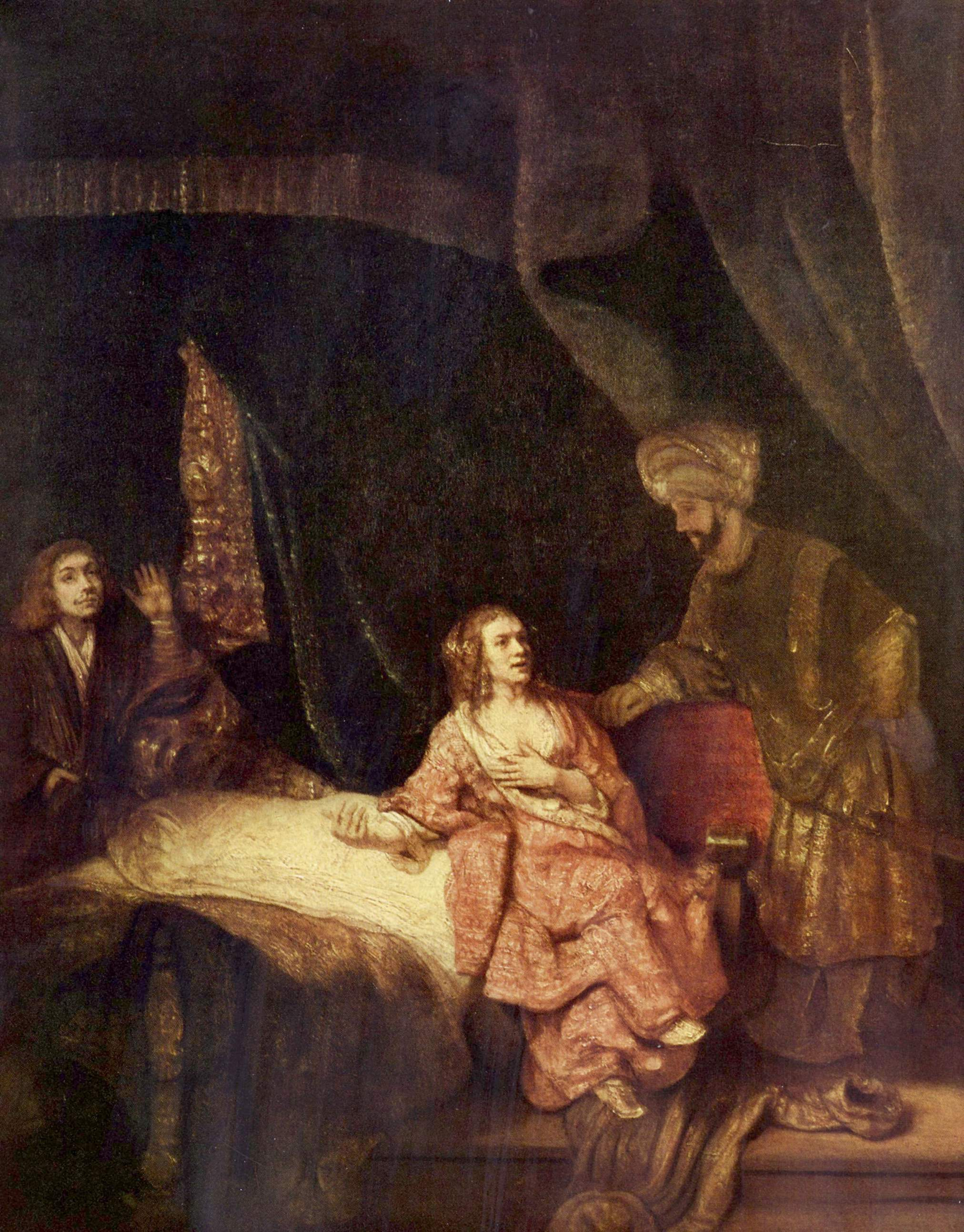
Joseph Accused by Potiphar's Wife, by Rembrandt van Rijn, 1655.

=== In art ===
- Potiphar's story became prevalent in Western art during the Renaissance and Baroque periods, usually depicting the moment when Joseph tears himself away from the bed containing a more or less naked figure of Potiphar's wife. The subject is most commonly shown in the Power of Women topos.

=== Poetry ===
- There is a Persian poem called Yusuf and Zulaikha in Jami's Haft Awrang ("Seven thrones").
- In The Divine Comedy, Dante sees the shade of Potiphar's wife in the eighth circle of Hell. She does not speak, but Dante is told by another spirit that, along with other perjurers, she is condemned to suffer a burning fever for all eternity.
- In John Keats' second poem "On Fame", Keats calls Fame "Sister-in-law to jealous Potiphar".

=== In literary texts ===
- In Joseph and his Brothers, Thomas Mann suggests that Potiphar's wife is sexually frustrated partly because Potiphar is a eunuch.
- In Margaret Atwood's The Testaments, the sequel to The Handmaid's Tale, Potiphar's wife is referred to in Chapter 46 of the Ardua Hall Holograph storyline as narrated by Aunt Lydia. She mentions that Dr. Grove defended himself against attempted rape charges through the Potiphar vignette.
- Czechoslovak author Valdemar Vinař wrote La skandalo pro Jozefo, an original work of fiction in Esperanto, relating the story from the viewpoints of five different witnesses.

=== Dramatic realisations ===
- Prophet Joseph is an Iranian historical drama that tells the story of prophet Joseph. In this TV series, Jafar Dehghan plays the role of Potiphar.
- In 1987 John Sayles's 1987 film Matewan, a young minister boy preaches the story of Potiphar to his small town.
- In Andrew Lloyd Webber and Tim Rice's musical Joseph and the Amazing Technicolor Dreamcoat, Potiphar is a tycoon of ancient Egypt who made his wealth through buying shares in pyramids ("Potiphar had made a huge pile, owned a large percentage of the Nile"). His wife is a seductive man-eater. Both feature in the song "Potiphar".
- In the film Joseph, Potiphar (played by Ben Kingsley) allows Joseph the opportunity to defend himself against his wife's accusations. Joseph proceeds to tell his life story from childhood to becoming a slave. Potiphar believes Joseph to be innocent, but has him imprisoned to save his reputation. When Joseph is made governor of Egypt, he and Potiphar share a moment of reconciliation before Joseph leaves to commence his work of preparing Egypt for the years of abundance and famine.
- In the animated film Joseph: King of Dreams, before having him jailed for allegedly assaulting his wife, Potiphar takes notice of Joseph's intelligence and makes him a chief slave in his household. He orders Joseph to be executed for the attempted rape of his wife; when she asks him to stop, Potiphar realizes Joseph was telling the truth, has him jailed instead to save face, and shows significant disgust at his wife. Potiphar later brings Joseph to Pharaoh, who is plagued by inexplicable dreams, and expresses deep regret for having Joseph put in prison, but Joseph understands and forgives Potiphar. After Joseph interprets Pharaoh's dreams, Pharaoh asks Potiphar if he trusts Joseph, to which he responds that he trusts Joseph "with [his] life". Potiphar is also present when Joseph reunites with his brothers.

== Gallery ==
Joseph and Potiphar's Wife in Art

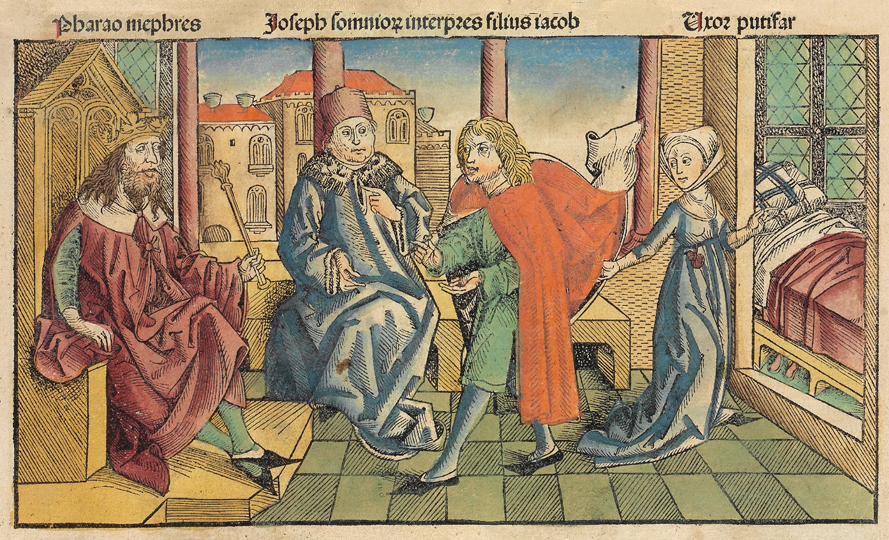
Nuremberg Chronicle 1493

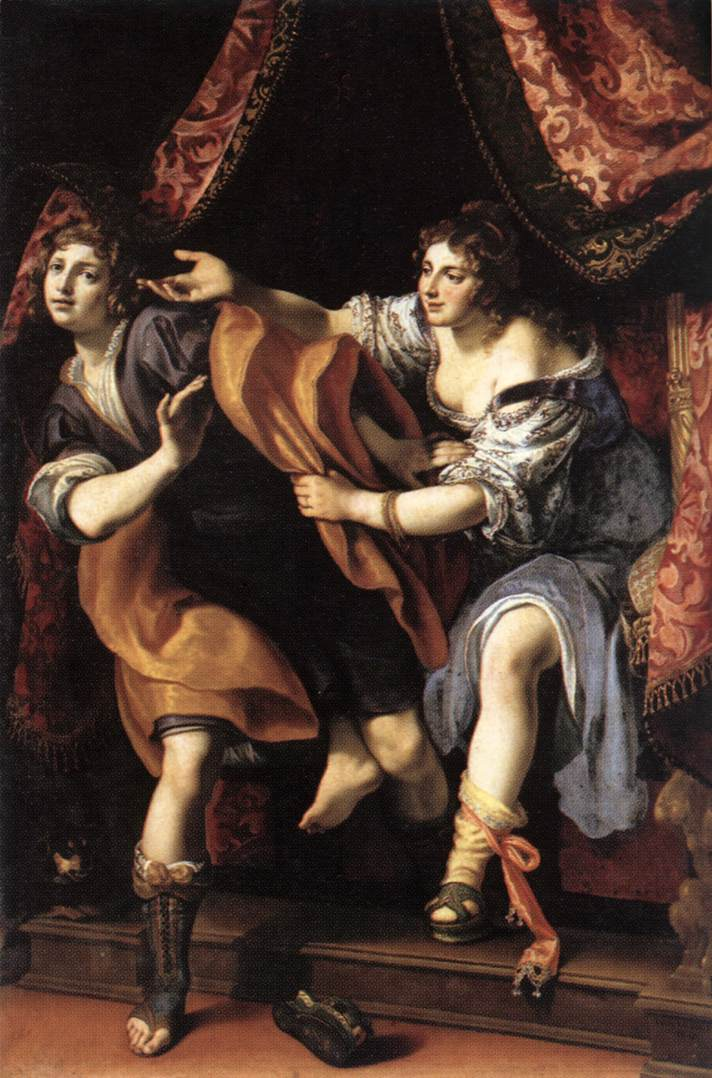
Joseph and Potiphar's Wife by Ludovico Cigoli

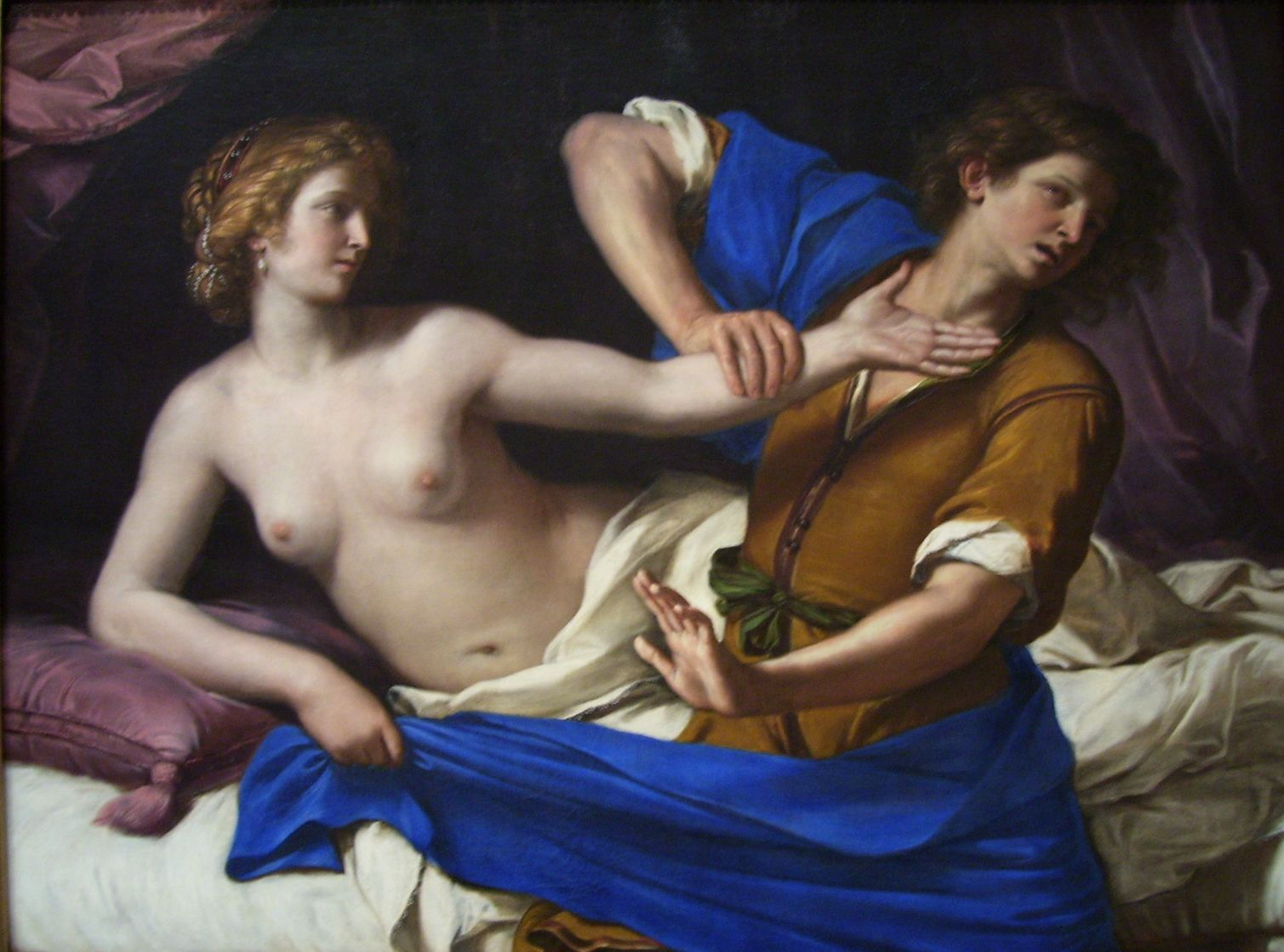
Joseph and Potiphar's Wife by Guercino, 1649

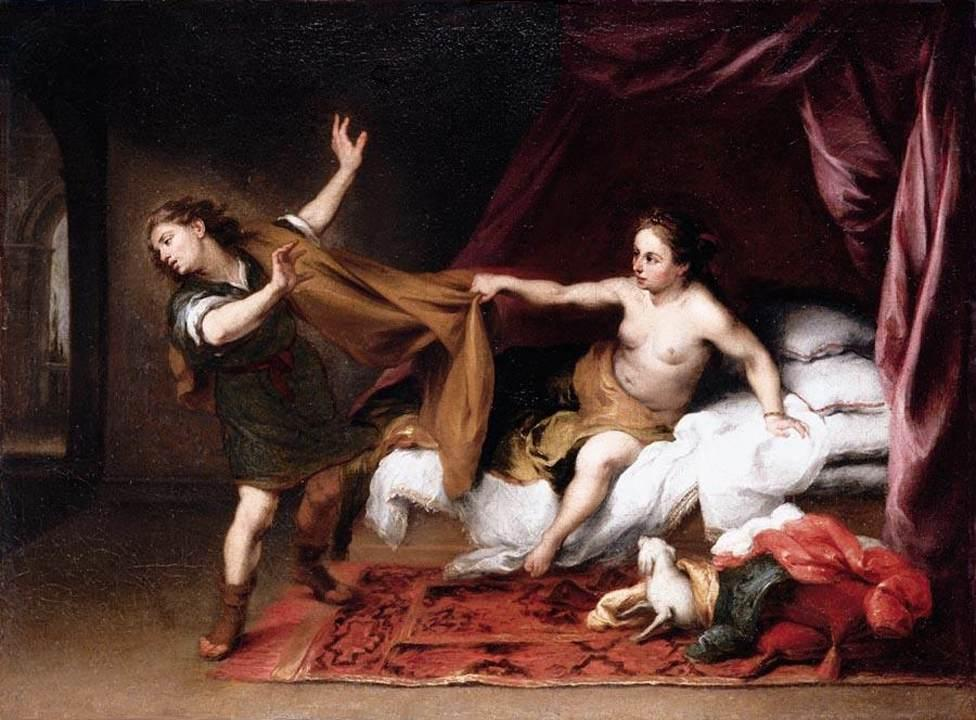
Joseph and Potiphar's Wife by Bartolomé Esteban Perez Murillo

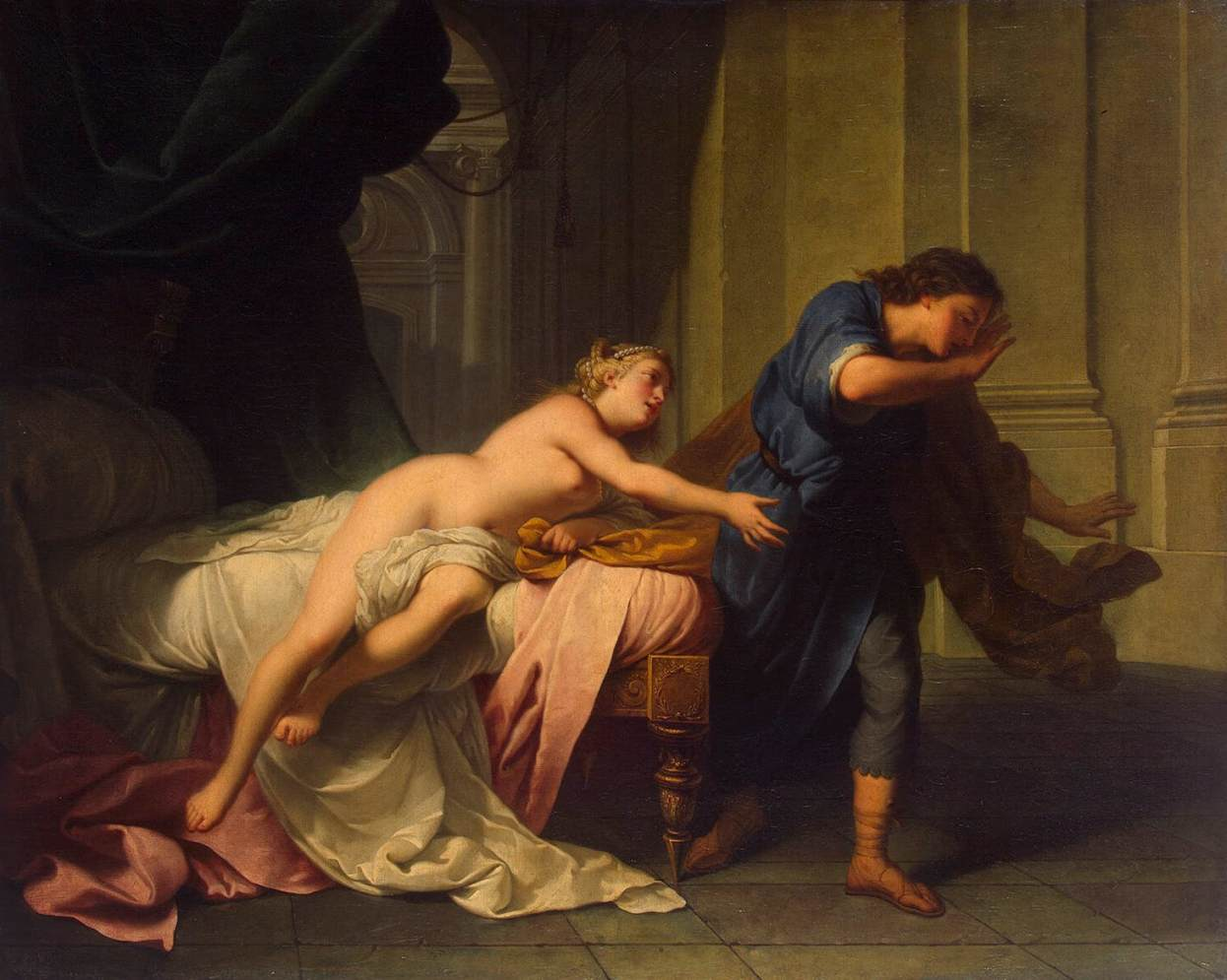
Joseph and Potiphar's Wife by Jean-Baptiste Nattier

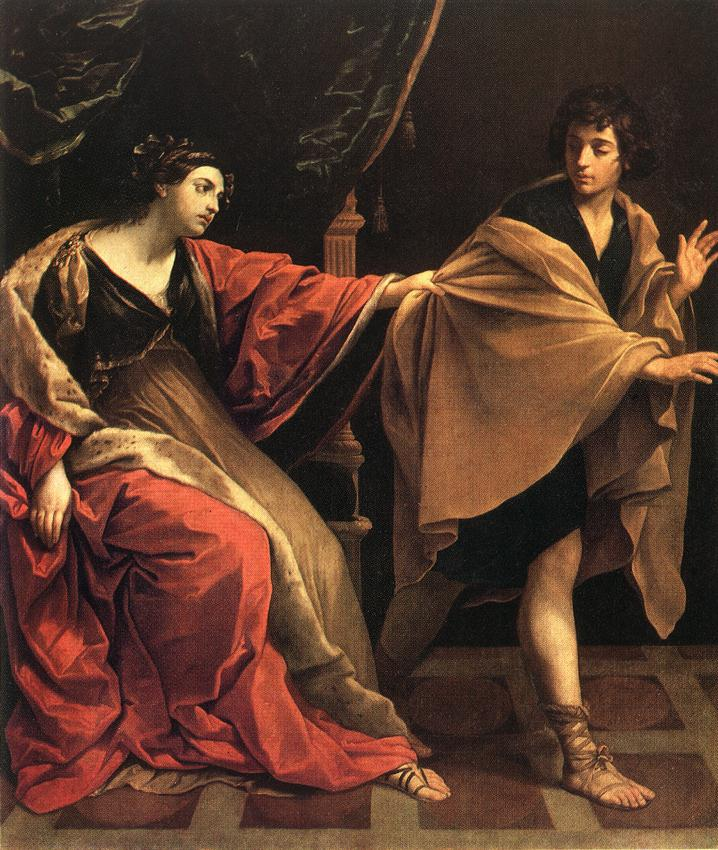
Joseph and Potiphar's Wife by Guido Reni, 1631

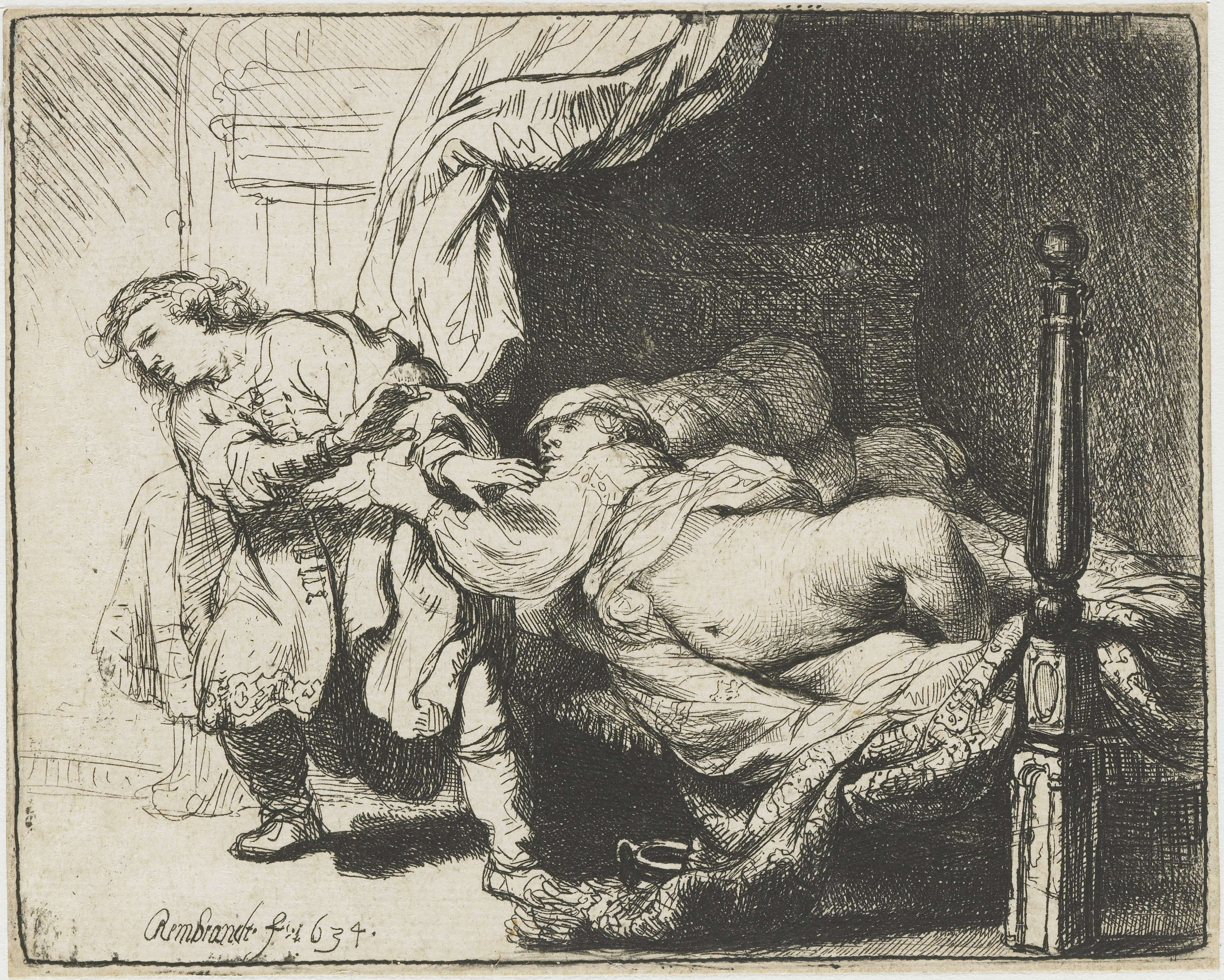
Joseph and Potiphar's Wife by Rembrandt, 1634

== See also ==
- Yusuf and Zulaikha
- Tale of Two Brothers

== Bibliography ==
- Osman, A. (1987), The Hebrew Pharaohs of Egypt, Bear & Co.: Rochester, Vermont. ISBN 9781591430223.
