= Jean-Baptiste Nattier =

French painter (1678–1726)

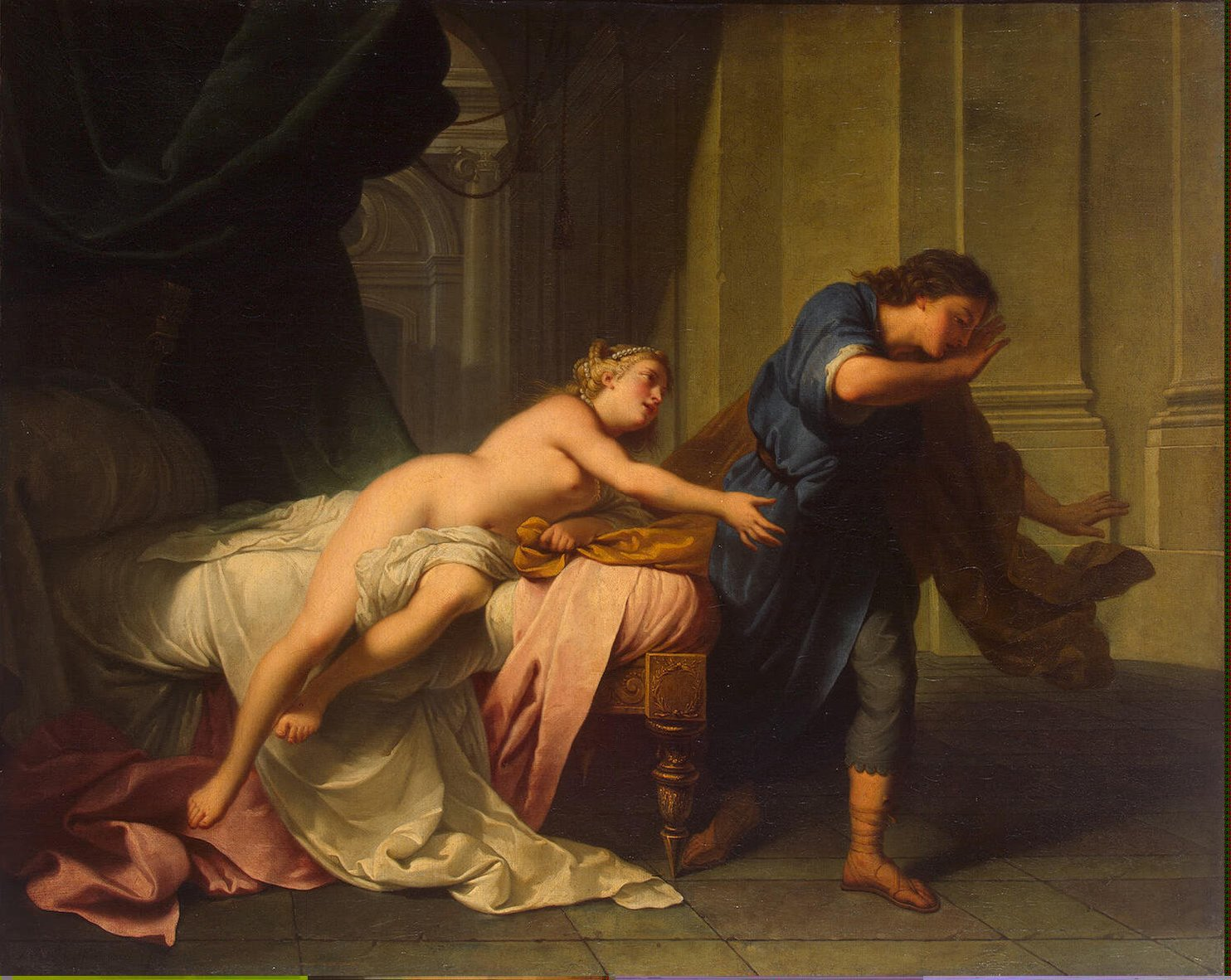
Joseph and Potiphar's Wife

Jean-Baptiste Nattier (27 September 1678, Paris - 23 May 1726, Paris) was a French history painter.

== Life & work ==
His father was the portrait painter, Marc Nattier and his mother was the miniaturist, Marie Courtois. His brother, Jean-Marc Nattier, also became a painter. Both brothers received their first art lessons from their father.

From 1704 to 1709, he studied at the Académie de France à Rome and, in 1712, was received as a member of the Académie royale de peinture et de sculpture upon presentation of his painting, Joseph sollicité par la femme de Putiphar.

He became involved in the sexual scandals surrounding Etienne-Benjamin Deschauffours, who was convicted for operating a pederastic network and executed. Nattier was imprisoned in the Bastille and his membership in the Académie was rescinded. Rather than suffer the fate of Deschauffour (whose corpse was publicly burned in the Place de Grève), he committed suicide by cutting his throat with an oyster knife.

His professional belongings at the Acadėmie were returned to his family.
