= Potipherah =

Priest of the ancient Egyptian town of On

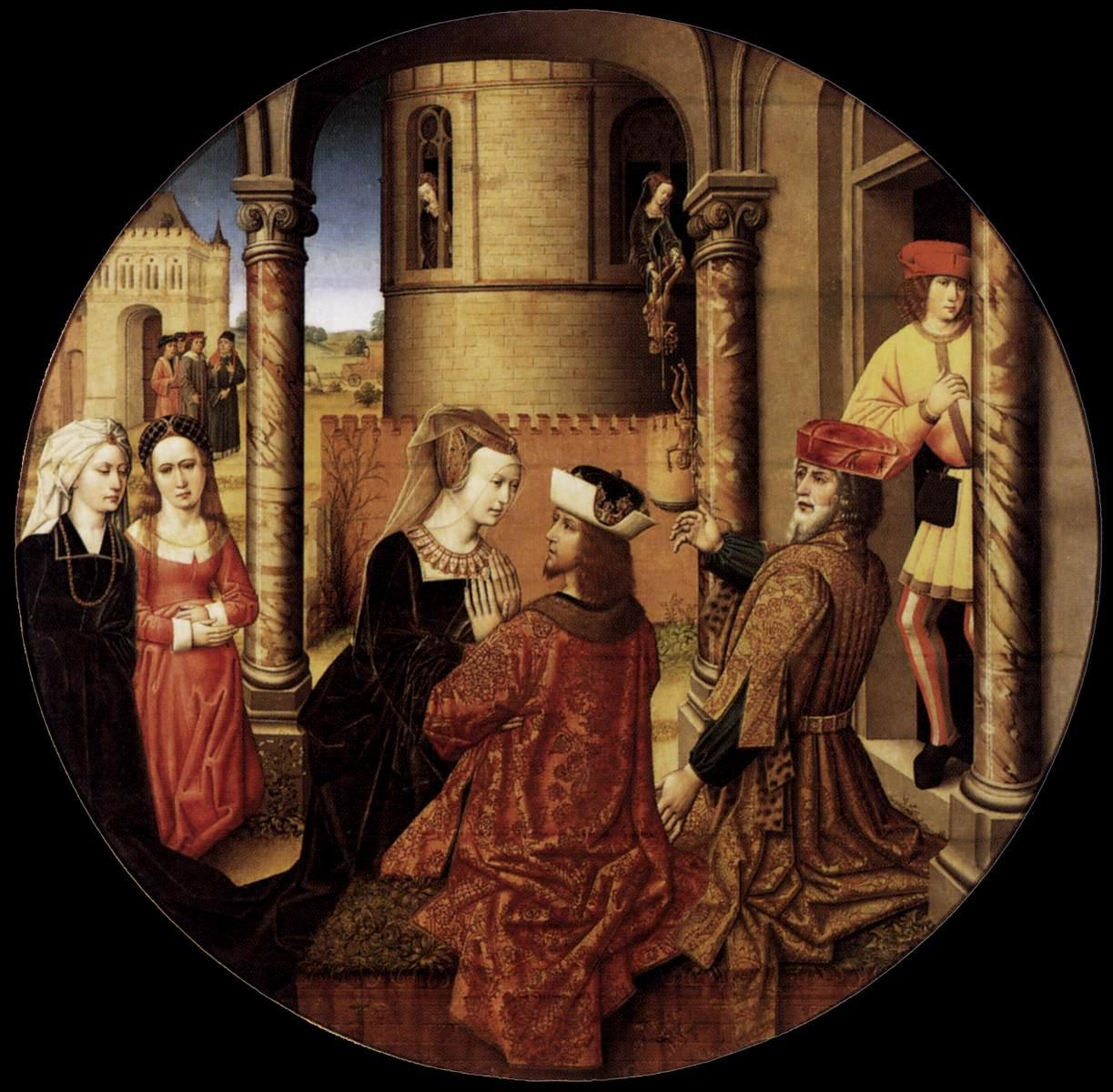
Joseph and Asenath together on this image in Berlin. Man depicted close to them may be Potiphera.

According to the Hebrew Bible, Potiphera (/pɒˈtɪfərə/, Hebrew: פּוֹטִי פֶרַע, romanized: Poṭi-p̄eraʿ) was a priest of the ancient Egyptian town of On, mentioned in the Genesis 41:45 and 41:50. He was the father of Asenath, who was given to Joseph as his wife by the Pharaoh, (41:45) and who bore Joseph two sons: Manasseh and Ephraim.

His name means "he whom Ra has given".

== Biblical source ==
Pharaoh then gave Joseph the name Zaphenath-paneah; and he gave him for a wife Asenath daughter of Poti-phera, priest of On. Thus Joseph emerged in charge of the land of Egypt.

— Genesis 41:45

== Theories ==
It has been noted that Potipherah served as a priest in Ra's most important cult center. A Jewish legend makes him the same person as Potiphar, whose wife was in love with Joseph and whose false accusation got him thrown in prison.
