= Judah ben Nissim =

Moroccan writer and philosopher

Judah ben Nissim Ibn Malka was a Moroccan, Jewish writer and philosopher living in the 13th century. His main work is Uns al-Gharīb (The Consolation of the Stranger). He also wrote a commentary on the Pirke De-Rabbi Eliezer and Tafsīr al-Salawāt, a commentary on liturgy and a work on astrology, which probably bore the title Kitāb al-Miftāh (The Key Book).
