= Etienne-Benjamin Deschauffours =

French procurer executed by burning

Etienne-Benjamin Deschauffours (c. 1690 in Viviers – 24 May 1726) was a French procurer. He was executed by burning for homosexuality on Place de Grève in Paris after having acted as a pimp of male prostitutes, some of which were underage boys whom he kidnapped, one of whom he was suspected of having murdered.

He was responsible for having prostituted about 200 males to male aristocrats, clerics and noblemen, and his arrested and trials were delayed a long time to avoid scandal, during which he was imprisoned in the Bastille, before he was finally put on trial. His trial were a famous case in his time and attracted a lot of attention.
