= Asenath =

Biblical figure

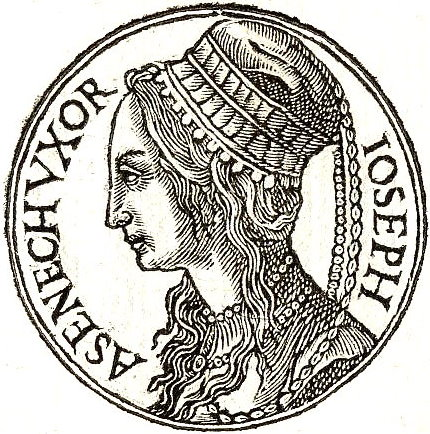
- Asenath from Guillaume Rouillé's Promptuarium Iconum Insigniorum

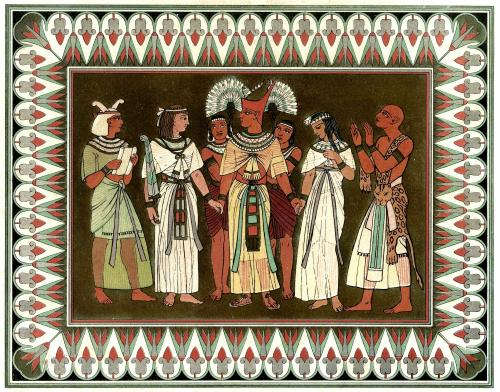
Joseph and Asenath

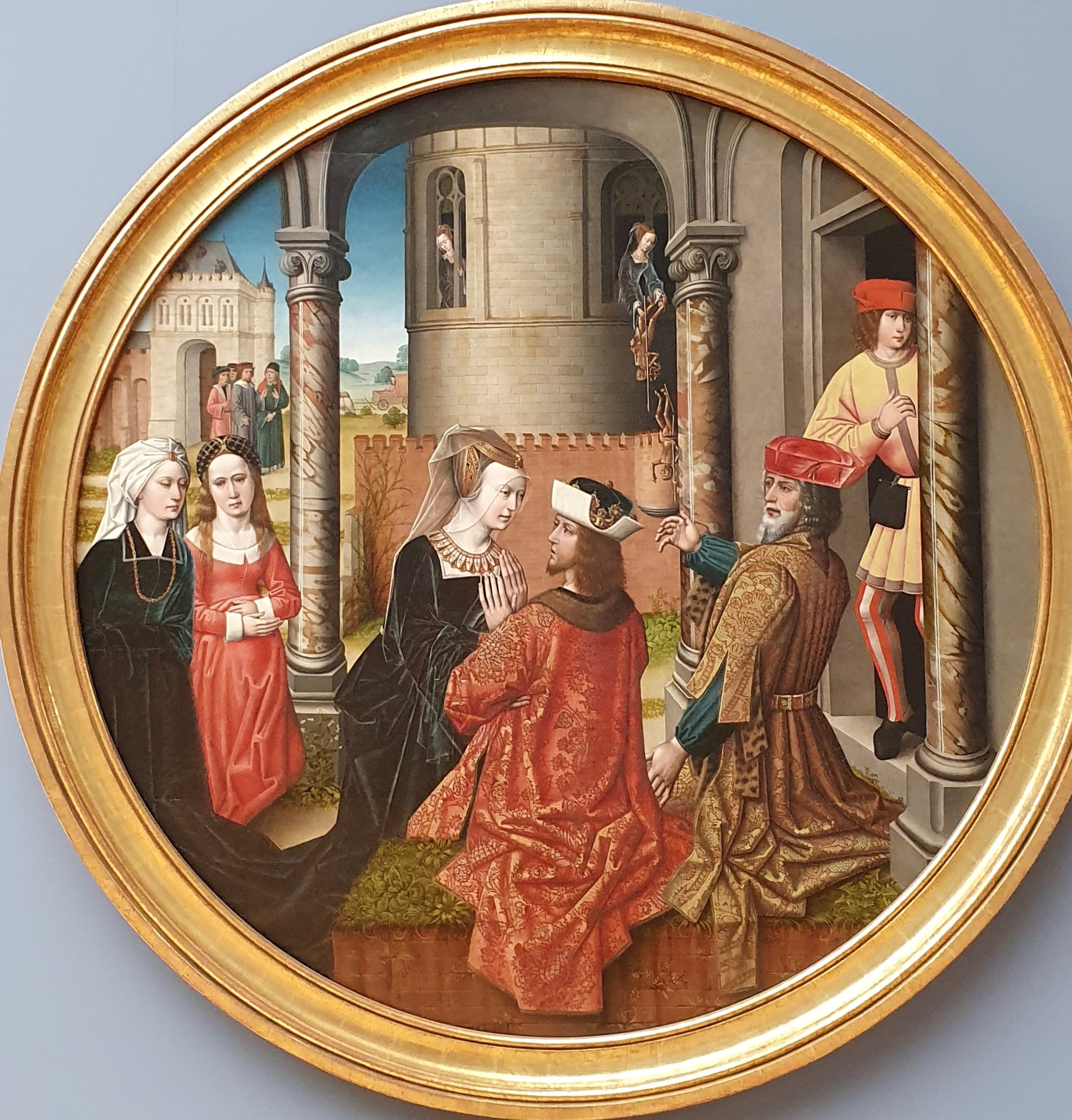
Joseph meets Asenath (1490s painting).

Asenath (/ˈæsɪnæθ/, Hebrew: אָסְנַת, Modern: ʾŎsnát, Tiberian: ʾĀsnaṯ; Koine Greek: Ἀσενέθ, Asenéth) is a minor figure in the Book of Genesis. Asenath was a high-born, aristocratic Egyptian woman. She was the wife of Joseph and the mother of his sons, Manasseh and Ephraim.

There are two Rabbinic approaches to Asenath. One holds that she was an Egyptian woman who converted to marry Joseph. This view has her accepting God before marriage and then raising her two sons in the tenets of Judaism. This presents her as a positive example of conversion to Judaism and places her among the devout women converts. The other approach argues she was not Egyptian by descent but was from the family of Jacob. Traditions that trace her to the family of Jacob relate that she was born as the daughter of Dinah. Dinah was raped by Shechem and gave birth to Asenath, whom Jacob left on the wall of Egypt, where she was later found by Potiphar. She was then raised by Potiphar's wife and eventually married Joseph. However, in Genesis Rabbah 80:11 she is not stated to be Dinah's daughter; rather, Dinah's rape resulted in her giving birth to Shaul, the son of Simeon.

Asenath's importance is related to the birth of her two sons, who later become forefathers of two of the Twelve Tribes of Israel.

== Name ==
Her name is believed to derive from the Ancient Egyptian js.tj-(n)-n(j)t, meaning "belonging/she belongs to Neith". Neith was an Egyptian goddess.

"Osnat" is a commonly used female first name in present-day Israel.

== Portrayal ==
Asenath is mentioned in three verses of the Bible, all in the Book of Genesis. First appearing in Genesis 41:45, Asenath is said to have been given by the Pharaoh to Joseph as a wife. Here, she is referred to as the daughter of Potipherah, priest of On (Gk. Heliopolis). Genesis 41:50 says that before the years of famine, Joseph had two sons with Asenath. The firstborn was named Manasseh and the second Ephraim. Later, in Genesis 46:20, Joseph and Asenath are mentioned in the family of Jacob; the verse says that in Egypt, Joseph had two sons named Manasseh and Ephraim, whom Asenath, daughter of Potiphera, the priest of On, bore to Joseph.

In the Book of Jubilees, generally considered to be apocryphal, Asenath is said to be given to Joseph to marry by the Pharaoh, a daughter of Potiphar, a high priest of Heliopolis, with no clarification as to whether or not this Potiphar is the same Potiphar whose wife falsely accused Joseph of attempting to rape her. While in the Midrash and Targum Pseudo-Jonathan, she is said to be the daughter of Dinah, Joseph's sister, and Shechem, born of an illicit union, described as either premarital sex or rape, depending on the narrative. A later-date apocryphal publication written in Greek, believed to be a Christian document, called Joseph and Aseneth, supposedly details their relationship and their 48-year long reign over Egypt; in it, Asenath weds Joseph, whose brothers Dan and Gad plot to kill him for the sake of Pharaoh's son, who wants Asenath to be his wife, only for their efforts to be thwarted by Joseph's younger brother Benjamin.

== Depictions ==
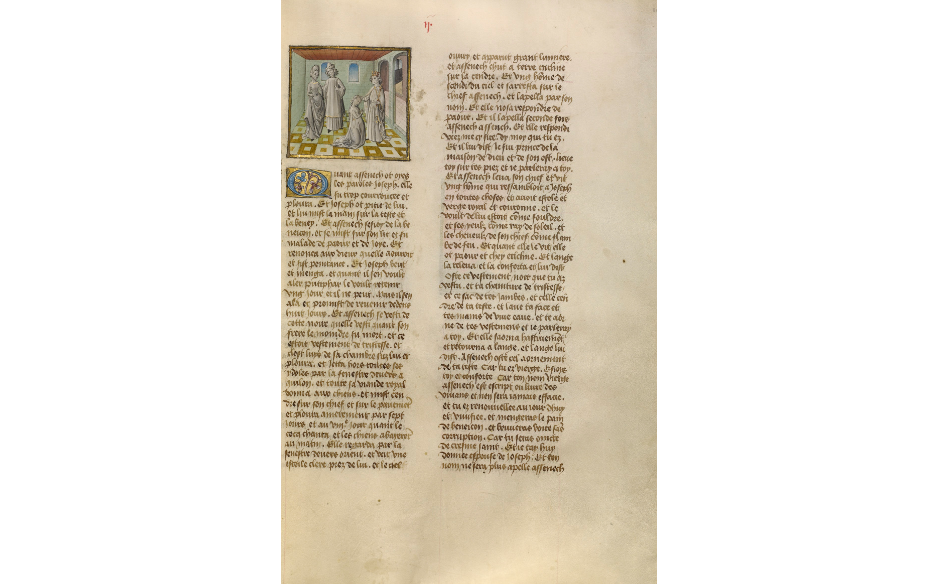
This painted image, which is part of a 1475 painted Flemish manuscript of unknown origin, shows Aseneth repenting. This image is likely inspired by an apocryphal text that describes Aseneth rejecting her pagan religion and repenting so that she may marry Joseph.

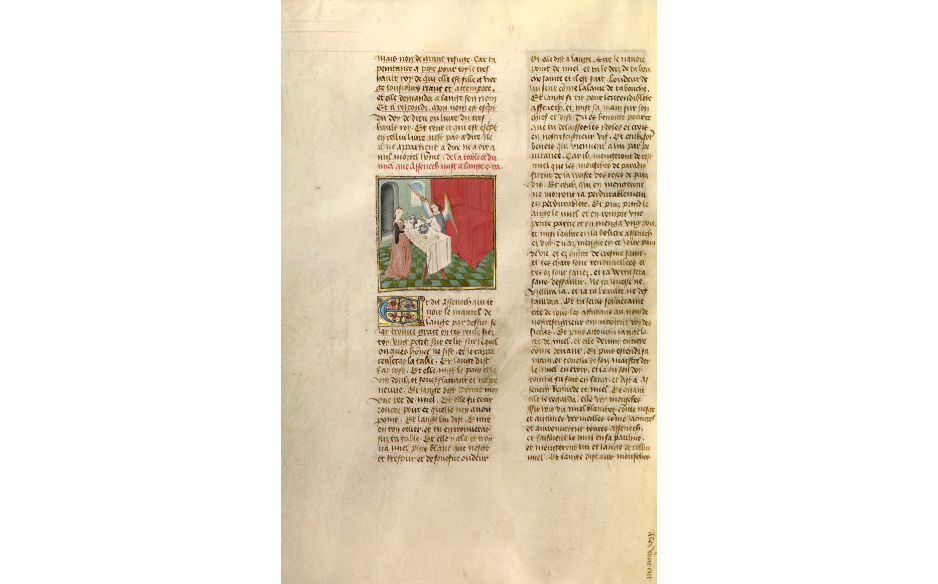
This painted image, which is part of a 1475 Flemish manuscript, shows Aseneth offering honey, wine, and bread to an angel. This image was likely inspired by an apocryphal text that describes Aseneth being visited by an angel after she rejects paganism and offering the angel bread and wine. In turn, the angel gives Aseneth a honeycomb.

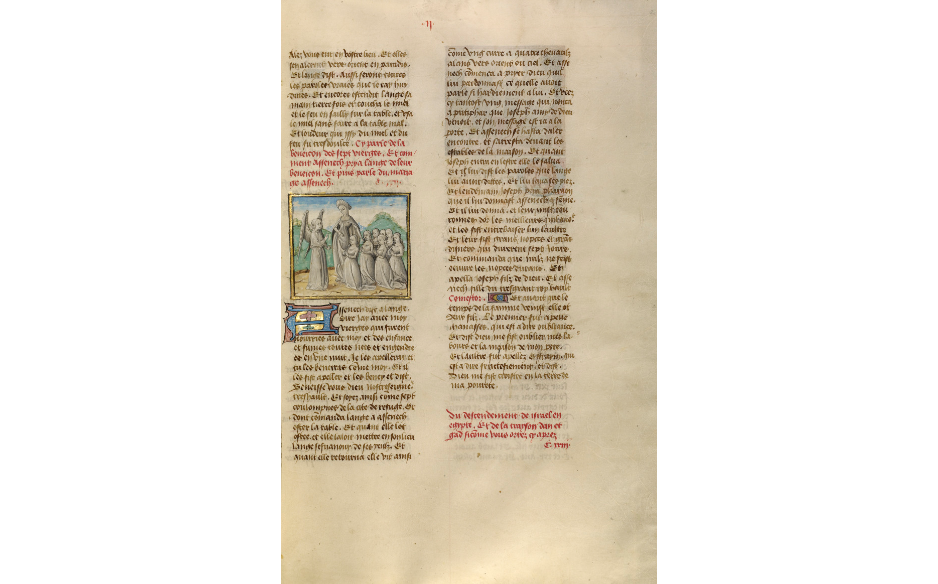
This image from a 1475 Flemish manuscript shows Aseneth asking for an angel's blessing for seven young women. The image is likely inspired by an apocryphal text in which Aseneth, while being visited by an angel after converting from paganism, asks the angel to bless her seven slaves.

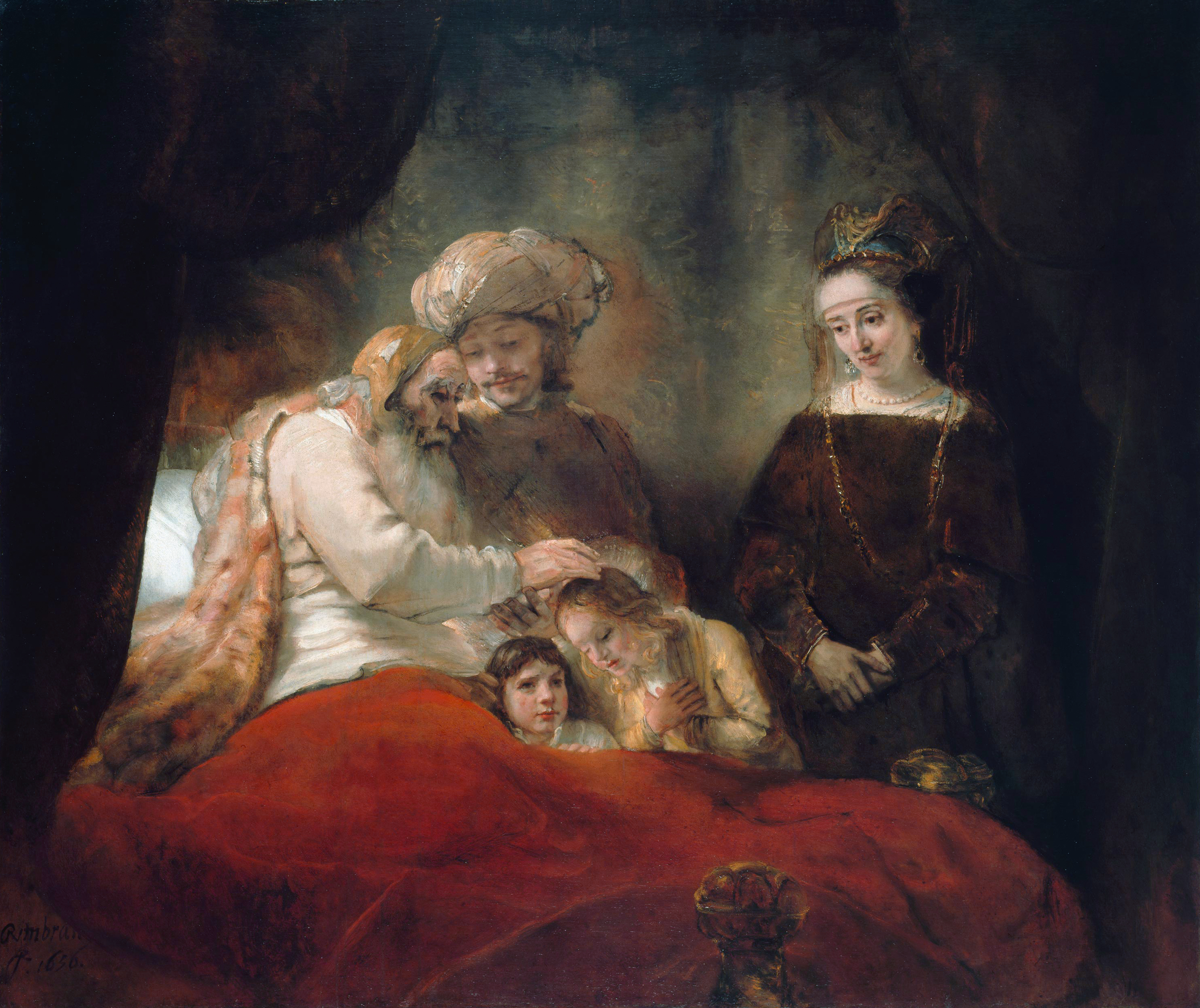
This Rembrandt work shows Aseneth standing with her husband, Joseph, and her sons, Manasseh and Ephraim, as her father-in-law, Jacob, blesses her sons.

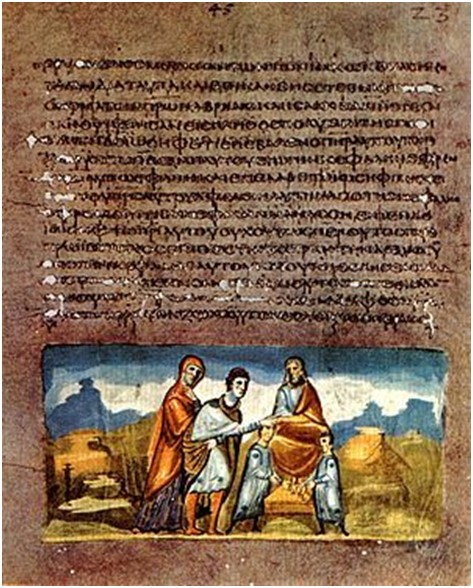
This image from an illuminated manuscript dating back to the 6th century shows Jacob blessing Joseph and Aseneth's sons, Ephraim and Manasseh, while Joseph and Aseneth look on.

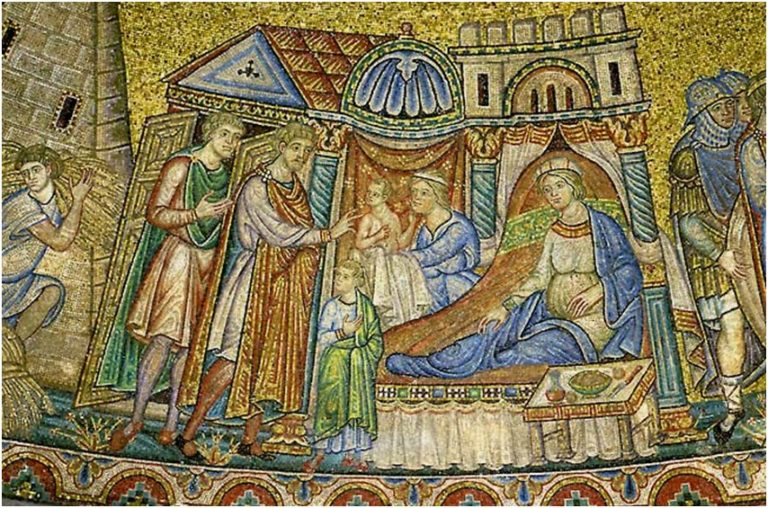
This mosaic in the Venetian Basilica di San Marco shows a midwife presenting the newborn Ephraim to Joseph. Aseneth and Manasseh are also present.
