= Potiphar's wife =

Figure from Jewish and Muslim tradition

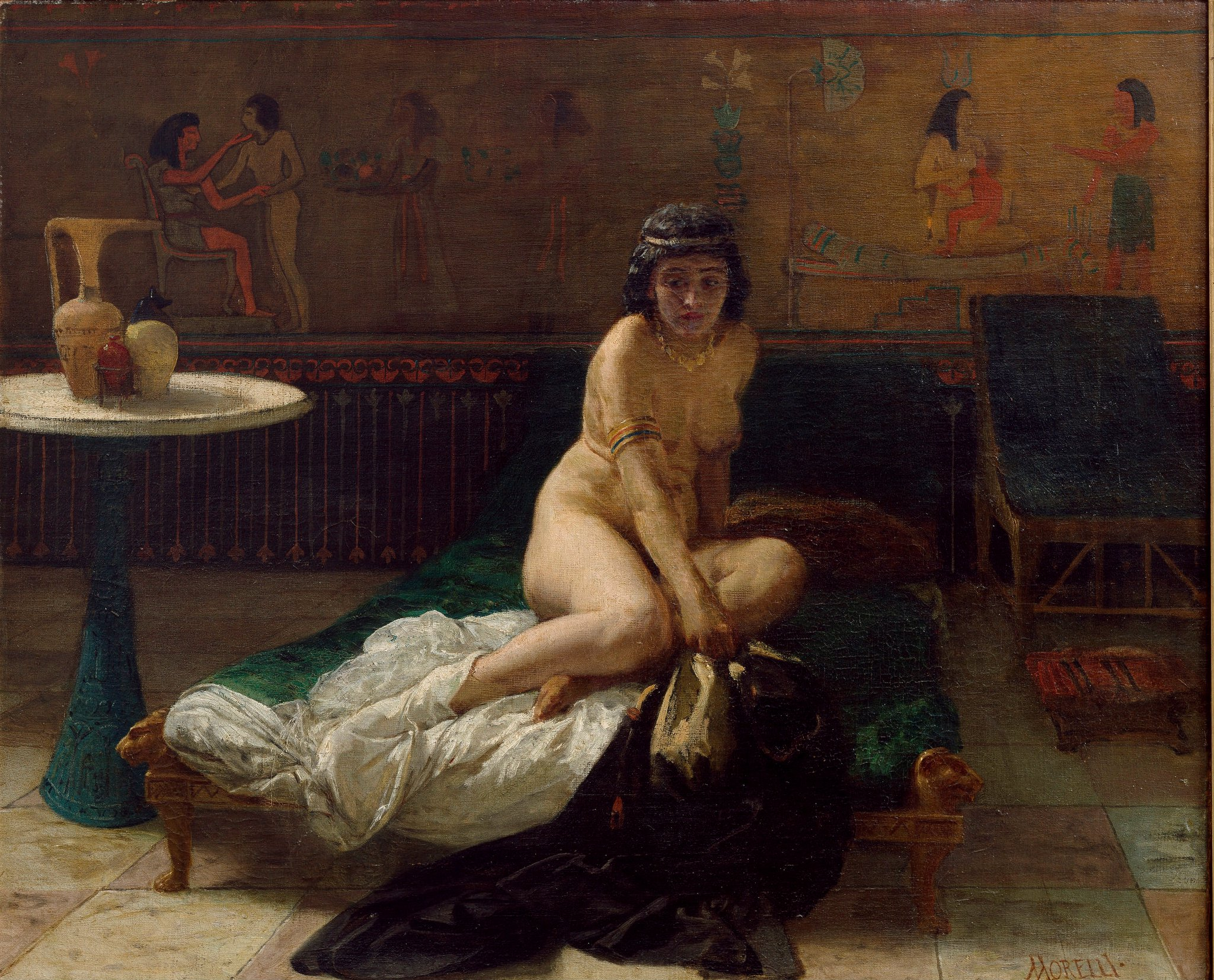
Potiphar's Wife, oil on canvas, by Domenico Morelli, 1861.

Potiphar's wife, also known as Zuleikha (/zuːˈleɪkɑː/ zoo-LAY-kah; Hebrew: זְלִיכָה, romanized: Zəlīḵā; Arabic: زُلَيْخَا, romanized: Zulayḵā), is a figure in the Hebrew Bible and the Quran. She was the wife of Potiphar, the captain of Pharaoh's guard in the time of Jacob and his twelve sons. According to the Book of Genesis, she falsely accused Joseph of attempted rape after he rejected her sexual advances, resulting in his imprisonment.

She is given no name in Genesis, but in later medieval Jewish sources and Islamic tradition, she is identified as Zuleikha. The story of Yusuf and Zulaikha is a popular one in Islamic literature.

== In Genesis ==
The Book of Genesis narrates her treatment of Joseph, slave to her husband Potiphar:

And he left all that he had in Joseph's hand; and, having him, he knew not aught save the bread which he did eat. And Joseph was of beautiful form, and fair to look upon. And it came to pass after these things, that his master's wife cast her eyes upon Joseph; and she said: "Lie with me." But he refused, and said unto his master's wife: "Behold, my master, having me, knoweth not what is in the house, and he hath put all that he hath into my hand; he is not greater in this house than I; neither hath he kept back any thing from me but thee, because thou art his wife. How then can I do this great wickedness, and sin against God?" And it came to pass, as she spoke to Joseph day by day, that he hearkened not unto her, to lie by her, or to be with her. And it came to pass on a certain day, when he went into the house to do his work, and there was none of the men of the house there within, that she caught him by his garment, saying: "Lie with me." And he left his garment in her hand, and fled, and got him out. [...] And she laid up his garment by her, until his master came home. And she spoke unto him according to these words, saying: "The Hebrew servant, whom thou hast brought unto us, came in unto me to mock me. And it came to pass, as I lifted up my voice and cried, that he left his garment by me, and fled out." And it came to pass, when his master heard the words of his wife, which she spoke unto him, saying: "After this manner did thy servant to me"; that his wrath was kindled. And Joseph's master took him, and put him into the prison, the place where the king's prisoners were bound; and he was there in the prison.

== In Quran ==
Potiphar's wife, as well as Potiphar himself, are not explicitly named in the Quran, though it alludes to a governor (Arabic: العزيز al-azīz) and his wife. The book narrates her treatment of Yusuf as follows:

And she, in whose house he was, sought to seduce him. She closed the doors and said, "Come to me!" He (Joseph) responded, "God forbid! He (Potiphar) is my master, he treats me well, and the wrongdoers never succeed." She desired him, and he desired her had he not seen his Lord's evidence. Thus, We diverted evil and indecency from him; he was one of Our devoted servants. They raced to the door, and she tore his shirt from behind. They encountered her husband at the door, to whom she cried, "What's the penalty for someone who intended harm to your family, if not imprisonment or a severe punishment?" He said, "It was she who tried to seduce me." A witness from her family suggested, "If his shirt is torn from the front, then she told the truth, and he is the liar. But if his shirt is torn from the back, she has lied, and he is the truthful one." Seeing his shirt torn from the back, he (Potiphar) said, "This is one of your cunning tricks. Your scheming is indeed considerable." "Joseph, overlook this. And you, woman, ask forgiveness for your sin. You are certainly in the wrong." Some women in the city said, "The governor's wife is trying to seduce her servant; she is deeply in love with him. We see her as clearly misguided." Upon hearing their whispers, she invited them over, prepared a feast for them, and gave each of them a knife. She then commanded, "Come out before them!" When they saw him (Joseph), they marveled at him and cut their hands, exclaiming, "God preserve us! This is not a human! This is none other than a noble angel." She said, "This is the one for whom you blamed me for. Yes, I tried to seduce him, but he firmly resisted. If he doesn't do as I command him, he will be imprisoned and will become humiliated." He said, "My Lord, prison is more desirable to me than what they call me to. Unless You divert their plot from me, I might incline toward them and become of the ignorant." His Lord answered his prayer and averted their scheme from him. He is the All-Hearing, the All-Knowing. It seemed good to them, after they had seen the proofs, to imprison him for a time.

— Surah Yusuf Quran 12:22–35

== Interpretation ==
=== In Jewish sources ===
The Sefer haYashar adds more details about Potiphar's wife's character, referred to there as "Zelicah". She tried to seduce Joseph with expensive garments, delicious viands and amorous words, but when these attempts failed, she resorted to threats. Joseph resisted every temptation and this caused the wife to feel sick. One day, she saw her friends cutting themselves with knives whilst they peeled oranges due to Joseph's appearance. The wife told them that she suffered like them because she was forced to see Joseph every day.

Other Jewish traditions say that the wife tried to kill her husband so she could keep Joseph to herself. Joseph reprimanded her for making him complicit in attempted adultery and murder. But the wife told him that she and her people would accept Joseph's religion if he yielded. Again, Joseph told her that Yahweh does not desire "unchaste worshippers" and after the wife invited him in a bedroom filled with idols, he told her that he feared Yahweh, who "saw all things".

They also state that the wife attempted to seduce Joseph during a religious festival at the Nile River and that everyone knew Joseph's innocence, including the wife's eleven month old child and Asenath, who was the first to inform Potiphar. But Potiphar imprisoned Joseph to save his wife from public humiliation. Even after Joseph's freedom, the wife forced Joseph to look at her by putting an iron spear beneath his chin. Once more, Joseph resisted.

Rashi comments that the wife of Potiphar saw through astrology that she would have children through Joseph. The astrological calculations however were slightly off. Asenath, her daughter (by adoption, in some accounts) became the wife of Joseph and therefore the wife of Potiphar begot grandchildren (not children) through Joseph.

=== In Islamic sources ===
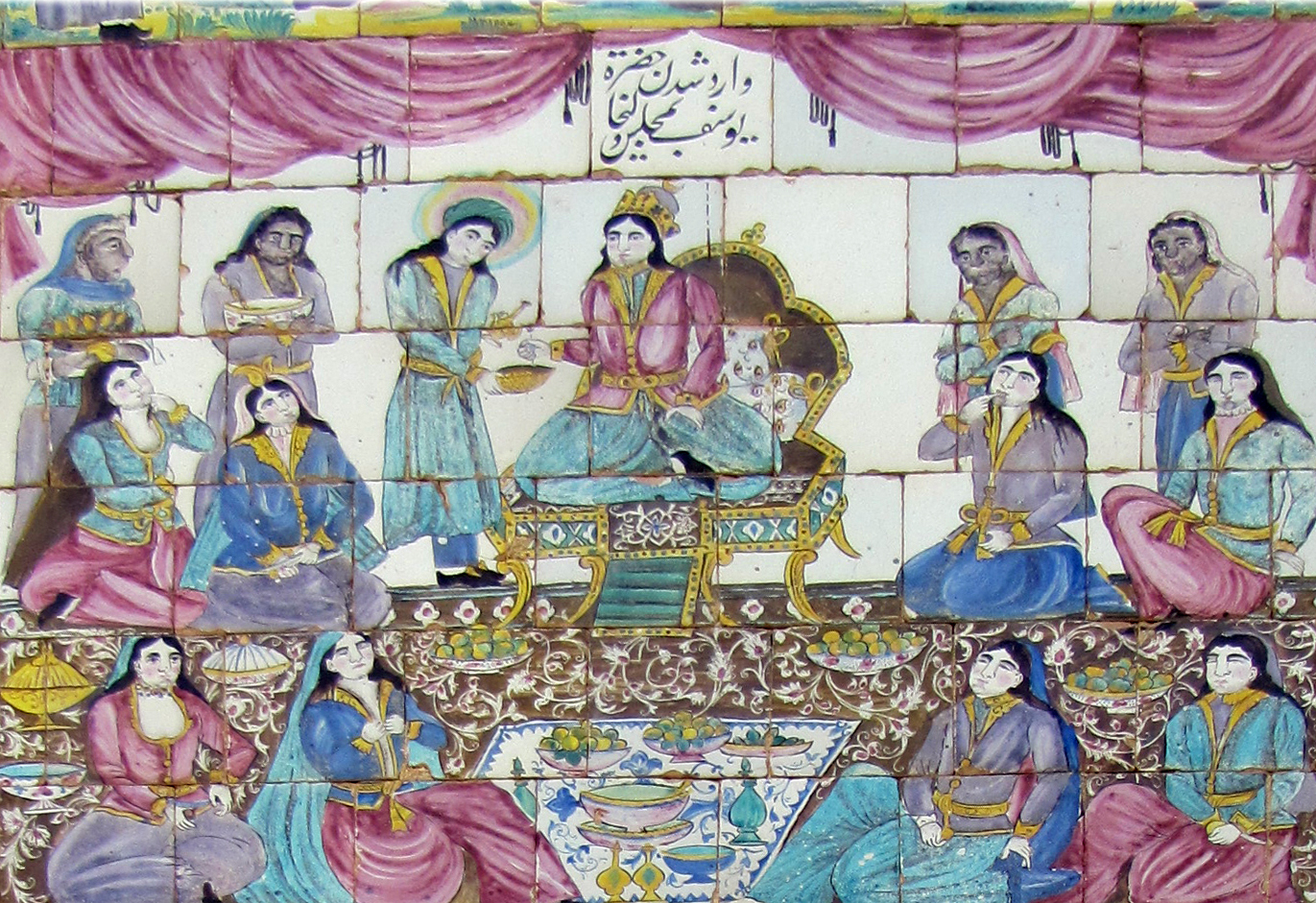
Zuleika Ceremony Islamic art; painting on tiles of Mo'avin-Almamalik tekyeh, Kermanshah

Muslim scriptural commentators (Mufassirun) have regarded Zuleikha as a sinner and villainess with the exceptions of the Muslim mystic poets Rumi, Hafiz and Jami. For Rumi, Zuleikha's obsession with Joseph is a symptom and manifestation of the soul's great deep longing for God. For this, he insists, it is true of any person's deep love for another.

=== Scholarly criticism ===
Hebrew scholar Harry M. Orlinsky comments that in her allegation raised with the men of her household in verse 14 of the Genesis account, Potiphar's wife states that her husband "has brought among us a Hebrew to laugh at us" and that "he came in to me to lie with me". When she reports Joseph to Potiphar in verse 17, the account only states that he "came in to me to laugh at me", without the sexual allegation: "the whole point of the story is lacking in the latter verse, viz., the attempted seduction".

Scholars such as Meir Sternberg (1985) characterise the woman's repetitive behaviour towards Joseph as sexual assault. McKinlay (1995) noted that Potiphar's wife is treated as an object in his master's possession (Gen 39:8–9), and the reason Joseph refuses is not because he doesn't find her attractive, but because it would violate his master's trust and be a sin against the God Yahweh. Secular feminist perspectives that are not trying to understand the biblical perspective but are critical of the patriarchal nature of the myth as part of broader textual criticism of the Old Testament have argued the woman is trying to assert herself as a person who makes her own choices instead of remaining an object owned by her husband, and invites Joseph to join her in this action which the narrative frames as a 'sin'. Simultaneously, however, she abuses her position of power as the slave master's wife to coerce Joseph into sex, and to punish him for refusal. Susan Tower Hollis (1989) demonstrated that the narrative of Potiphar's wife "is in line with certain ancient folk-tales", where a "woman makes vain overtures to a man and then accuses him of attempting to force her", with the man "unjustly punished for his alleged attempt to seduce the woman". Rachel Adelman suggests that both Potiphar and his wife were sexually attracted to Joseph and planned to assault him. But the angels castrated Potiphar, according to Talmudic legend, whilst his wife proceeded her plot so that Joseph could be the "Jewish hero" that resists the "bear". Others believe the story is a typical seduction/adultery plot, which was common in Hellenistic literature, and a criticism of assimilation in Egyptian society.

== See also ==
- Joseph and Aseneth
- Josephslegende (The Legend of Joseph), Op. 63, a 1914 ballet based on the story of Potiphar's wife, with music by Richard Strauss.
- Names for the Biblical nameless
- Sudabeh (re: attempted seduction and false accusation of Siyâvash)
- Prophet Joseph (TV series)
