= Rachel Adelman =

American rabbi, scholar, and professor

- Occupations: Rabbi, Biblical scholar

Academic background
- Education: Reed College; Matan / Baltimore Hebrew University; Hebrew University of Jerusalem

Academic work
- Discipline: Hebrew Bible, Midrash, Gender studies
- Notable works: The Return of the Repressed: Pirqe de-Rabbi Eliezer and the Pseudepigrapha (2009); The Female Ruse: Women’s Deception and Divine Sanction in the Hebrew Bible (2015)

Rachel Adelman is an American rabbi, scholar, and Associate Professor of Hebrew Bible at Hebrew College in Newton, Massachusetts.

== Education and early career ==
Adelman completed a B.A. at Reed College (Portland, Oregon), majoring in biology with a minor in creative writing, graduating with first-class honors. She then pursued religious and biblical studies: she received an M.A. from the joint women’s program of Matan / Baltimore Hebrew University in Jerusalem.

Adelman earned her Ph.D. from Hebrew University of Jerusalem in Hebrew Literature, specializing in midrash. Her doctoral dissertation was titled "The Poetics of Time and Space in the Midrashic Narrative: The Case of Pirqe de-Rabbi Eliezer."

== Academic career ==
Since 2012, Adelman has been a full-time faculty member at Hebrew College, serving as Associate Professor of Hebrew Bible.

Previously, she taught at Matan in Jerusalem, and also held visiting teaching and postdoctoral positions - including a research assistantship in the Women’s Studies in Religion Program at Harvard Divinity School.

== Bibliography ==
- The Return of the Repressed: Pirqe de-Rabbi Eliezer and the Pseudepigrapha (Brill, 2009) ISBN 9789004170490
- The Female Ruse: Women's Deception and Divine Sanction in the Hebrew Bible (Hebrew Bible Monographs) (Sheffeld Phoenix Press, 2017) ISBN 9781910928257
- contributor, Jewish Women's History from Antiquity to the Present (Wayne State University Press, 2021) ISBN 9780814346310
- contributor, A Quest for Our Times: The Louis Jacobs Haggadah (Izzun Books and the Louis Jacobs Foundation, 2025) ISBN 9781739089658
