= Joseph: Beloved Son, Rejected Slave, Exalted Ruler =

2015 animated film

- DVD poster
- Directed by: Robert Fernandez
- Written by: Robert Fernandez
- Based on: Book of Genesis
- Produced by: Chris Jung; Robert Fernandez
- Starring: Chris Jung; Robert Magruder; Mike McFarland
- Edited by: Chris Jung
- Music by: Michael Creswell Dooley
- Production company: Herald Entertainment
- Distributed by: Vision Video
- Release date: January 5, 2015
- Running time: 90 minutes
- Country: United States
- Language: English

Joseph: Beloved Son, Rejected Slave, Exalted Ruler is a 2015 American direct-to-video animated biblical drama film. It is an adaptation of the story of Joseph from the Book of Genesis in the Bible. The film tells the story of Joseph and his journey from being a dreamer to being a slave in Egypt to becoming a powerful ruler in Egypt and the savior of his people, the Israelites. After many years in prison, his faith and his gift for interpreting dreams lead him to a grand position in the kingdom of Egypt.

Featuring traditional animation and some computer-generated imagery, the film depicts story in the context of God's plan for Israel and the promised arrival of the Messiah, using artistic license to fill in gaps with imagined yet plausible conversations in the narrative.

== Plot ==
As a young man, Joseph is a dreamer who is favored by his father Jacob and resented by his older brothers. After Joseph recounts his dream in which he saw his brothers bowing before him, they become furious and sell him into slavery. They convince their father that Joseph was killed by wolves. Whilst captive in Egypt, Joseph becomes a trusted servant of Potiphar, but later experiences humiliation and imprisonment after Potiphar's wife falsely claims that he raped her. Years later, whilst Joseph is in prison, Pharaoh becomes pestered by nightmares which none of his advisors can interpret. Joseph interprets the Pharaoh's dreams and suggests that one fifth of each year's harvest should be stored for rationing. Astonished, the Pharaoh appoints Joseph his prime minister under the name "Zaphnath-Paaneah".

A few years pass, Joseph marries Asenath and has two sons, Manasseh and Ephraim. One day, Joseph is surprised by his brothers who come to Egypt to buy grain. Unrecognized by them, Joseph imprisons Simeon, until they can prove their story by bringing their youngest brother, Benjamin, who is later brought. After inviting the brothers to a feast, Joseph orders that Benjamin shall be punished, but the brothers offer themselves in his place to Joseph's surprise, where they confess to having sold Joseph into slavery. Joseph finally reveals himself to them, and they reconcile. Joseph reunites with his father Jacob. The film concludes with Joseph's bones being carried into Israel, and the birth of the Messiah, Jesus.

== Voice cast ==
- Mike McFarland - Joseph
- Bob Magruder - Jacob
- Chris Jung - Reuben
- Jeff Kribs - Simeon
- Richard Stevens - Judah
- James Scott - Levi
- Neil K. Hess - Benjamin
- Will Irace - Dan
- John McCalmont - Potiphar
- Jim White - Pharoah/Narrator
- R. Bruce Elliot - Abraham/The Baker
- Ellen Cribbs - Sarah
- Bruce Carey - The Cupbearer
- Tom Schalk - Potiphar's Attendant
- Blair Wilson - Joseph's Attendant
- David Melvin - Voice of God
- Chris Hardy - Ishmaelite Trader
- Sheridan Wright - Potiphar's wife

== Media ==
First premiered on 5 January 2015, the film was released on DVD nationwide on 19 May 2015. The DVD features Spanish dubbing and subtitles. The film was later released on YouTube on 12 March 2021, where it has garnered over 14 million views as of 2024.

== Reception ==
Dove.org gave the film a positive review, stating that it "features good voice actors, appropriate music (with Egyptian-sounding music for example while in Egypt), and dramatic music, along with strong character development", before concluding "the vivid and colorful animation brings this wonderful story of Joseph to life". C. Block from Video Librarian gave the film four out of four stars, praising the "excellent animation and compelling voice work".

=== Accolades ===
The film won at the 2016 International Christian Visual Media Crown Awards and the 2016 Gold Crown Award for Best Children's Film.

== See also ==
- Joseph: King of Dreams
- The Prince of Egypt
- List of films featuring slavery
