= Joseph: King of Dreams =

2000 DreamWorks Animation film

- Release poster
- Directed by: Robert Ramirez; Rob LaDuca
- Screenplay by: Eugenia Bostwick-Singer; Raymond Singer; Joe Stillman; Marshall Goldberg
- Based on: Book of Genesis
- Produced by: Ken Tsumura
- Starring: Ben Affleck; Mark Hamill; Richard Herd; Maureen McGovern; Jodi Benson; Judith Light; James Eckhouse; Richard McGonagle
- Edited by: Michael Andrews
- Music by: Daniel Pelfrey (score); John Bucchino (songs)
- Production company: DreamWorks Animation (Note: Animation outsourced to Bardel Animation Limited with additional animation outsourced to Big Fish Animation, Blue Sunflower, Canuck Creations, Character Builders, DreamWorks Animation, Dynomight Cartoons, Fil Cartoons, Giant Productions, Golden Bell Animation, Heart of Texas, Hits for Less, New Vision Productions, Ray Pang Effects, Red Rover, Spaff Animation, Starburst Animation, Tama Productions, Wang Film Productions and Wild Horse Animation Group.)
- Distributed by: DreamWorks Home Entertainment (Note: In July 2014, the film's distribution rights were purchased by DreamWorks Animation from Paramount Pictures (owners of the pre-2005 DreamWorks Pictures catalog) and transferred to 20th Century Fox before reverting to Universal Pictures in 2018.)
- Release date: November 7, 2000
- Running time: 74 minutes
- Country: United States
- Language: English

Joseph: King of Dreams is a 2000 American animated biblical musical drama film produced by DreamWorks Animation. The second film adaptation of the Bible from DreamWorks Animation and, to date, the only direct-to-video production they released, the film is an adaptation of the story of Joseph from the Book of Genesis in the Bible and serves as a prequel to the 1998 film The Prince of Egypt (as the biblical narrative of Joseph happens before that of Moses) as well as the second film in The Prince of Egypt franchise. Composer Daniel Pelfrey stated that the film was designed as a companion piece to The Prince of Egypt, noting that though "Joseph turned out to be very different than The Prince of Egypt, it was very challenging and rewarding".

Joseph: King of Dreams was released by DreamWorks Home Entertainment on November 7, 2000. Co-director Robert Ramirez said that whilst the reviews for the film had "generally been very good" there was a period "when the film was not working very well, when the storytelling was heavy-handed" and "klunky".

== Plot ==
Joseph, the youngest of Jacob's eleven sons, is considered to be a "miracle child" because his mother, Rachel, was thought to have been infertile. Joseph becomes conceited due to his parents' special treatment, leading to his brothers growing increasingly jealous of him. One night, Joseph dreams of a pack of wolves attacking the family's flock of sheep which comes true, though Joseph's brothers dismiss it as a coincidence. Joseph further enrages his brothers by recounting his next dream, in which he saw them bowing before him. Led by Jacob's fourth son, Judah, the brothers sell Joseph to a slave trader for twenty pieces of silver and bring his torn coat to their parents, convincing them that wolves killed Joseph.

Joseph is brought to Egypt and sold to Potiphar, the captain of (the unnamed) Pharaoh's guards. He becomes a trusted servant and falls in love with Potiphar's niece Asenath but Potiphar's wife, Zuleika, tries to seduce Joseph, and when rebuffed she falsely claims Joseph attempted to rape her. Potiphar orders Joseph’s execution, but Zuleika begs him not to. Realizing Joseph’s innocence, Potiphar spares his life, but has him imprisoned to preserve his honor. There, Joseph meets the Pharaoh's cupbearer and baker and interprets their dreams, which soon come true: the cupbearer will return to his position whilst the baker is executed. Joseph pleads with the cupbearer to tell Pharaoh about his gift, but he forgets to do so, while Asenath tries to secretly supply Joseph with food that is instead devoured by rats. Joseph rages at God for his misfortunes and unsuccessfully attempts to climb the walls of the jail, after which he finds renewed purpose by caring for a dying tree, where he reflects on his past and begins to trust in God's plan again.

When the Pharaoh becomes troubled by nightmares that none of his advisors can interpret, the cupbearer remembers Joseph and advises the Pharaoh to consult with him. Joseph forgives Potiphar for imprisoning him, then interprets the Pharaoh's dreams as warnings of seven years of abundance set to be followed by seven years of famine that may devastate Egypt. He suggests that one fifth of each year's harvest should be stored for rationing; impressed, the Pharaoh makes Joseph his minister and second-in-command, under the name "Zaphnath-Paaneah." In the following years, Joseph's guidance saves the Egyptians and their neighbors from starvation; he also marries Asenath and they have two sons, Manasseh and Ephraim.

Twenty years later, Joseph is horrified to see his brothers in Egypt attempting to buy grain for their father and youngest brother using the silver they sold him for. Unrecognized by them, Joseph refuses to sell them grain and orders one of the brothers, Simeon, imprisoned until they can prove their story by producing their youngest brother. The brothers reappear with Jacob's twelfth son, Benjamin, who resembles Joseph and is favored by their father as he was. Benjamin tells Joseph that Rachel died and that his father was heartbroken by Joseph's disappearance; Joseph questions Benjamin on whether his father trusts his brothers to look after him and how his supposed death affected them, but Benjamin says they never speak of it.

Joseph releases Simeon and invites the brothers to a feast, after which Joseph conceals his golden chalice in Benjamin's bag. Upon its discovery, he orders that Benjamin shall be punished, but the brothers all offer themselves in his place. When Joseph questions their motives, Judah confesses to having sold Joseph into slavery, which has haunted them all ever since, and that they could not bear to lose another brother and their father to lose another son. Shocked and touched by this, Joseph reveals himself to them, and they reconcile. Joseph reunites with Jacob and meets his brothers' families after inviting them to live in Egypt, unaware of the hardships their descendants will face in many years to come.

== Cast ==
=== Main voice cast ===
- Ben Affleck – Joseph
  - David Campbell – Joseph (singing voice)
- Mark Hamill – Judah
- Richard Herd – Jacob
  - Russell Buchanan – Jacob (singing voice)
- Maureen McGovern – Rachel
- Jodi Benson – Asenath
- Judith Light – Zuleika
- James Eckhouse – Potiphar
- Richard McGonagle – Pharaoh
- Dan Castellaneta – Auctioneer, Horse Trader
- René Auberjonois – Cupbearer
- Ken Hudson Campbell – Baker
- Steven Weber – Simeon, Slave Trader
- Jess Harnell – Issachar, Lead Trader
- Piera Coppola – Zuleika's servant, Additional Voices
- Emily Eby – Servant
- Matt Levin – Benjamin
- Jeff Bennett – Levi
- Tom Virtue – Reuben
- Kevin Michael Richardson – Potiphar's guard, Jail Warden

=== Additional voices ===
- Royce D. Applegate
- Roger Aaron Brown
- Debi Derryberry
- Murphy Dunne
- Jessica Gee
- Nicholas Guest
- Wendy Hoffman
- Luisa Leschin
- Randall Montgomery
- Jonathan Nichols
- Bibi Osterwald
- Michelle Ruff
- Doug Stone

== Production ==
=== Conception and development ===
Development for Joseph started while The Prince of Egypt was being made, so the same crew worked on both films, and the wide group of ministers served on both projects as consultants. Work on the film was based in Los Angeles and Canada, and nearly 500 artists contributed to the project.

Executive producer Penney Finkelman Cox and DreamWorks employee Kelly Sooter noted the challenge in telling a Bible story faithfully yet still making it interesting and marketable. They also noted that though it was destined to be a direct-to-video project from the beginning, their approach to the film was to develop it with the same quality and storytelling as they did with The Prince of Egypt. Creatives involved also noted that one of the most challenging parts of the film was creating Joseph's dream sequences, which look like "a Van Gogh painting in motion". Nassos Vakalis, who helped storyboard and animate the film, said that he had to travel a lot to Canada to see work done in a few studios that were subcontracting part of the film. Composer Daniel Pelfrey said that the writers and directors did a "great" job on staying true to the story and bringing it into a presentation for a contemporary audience.

=== Early work ===
Ramirez explained the early stages of the film's production:

December of 1997 was a great time on the production. While the script was being fleshed out, Paul Duncan (the head background painter) and Brian Andrews (story artist) were creating some phenomenal conceptual artwork. Francisco Avalos and Nasos Vakalis were doing storyboards based on a rough story outline. Weeks later we started assembling a very talented story crew that included artists that had both television and feature experience. We had a script that was well-structured and followed the Bible story fairly accurately. Once the First Act was storyboarded, we filmed the panels, recorded a temp vocal track with music, and edited it all together to create the storyreel. We were excited and ready for our First Act screening for Jeffrey Katzenberg, which was set for an early weekend morning in the New Year of 1998.

=== Screening and production troubles ===
Ramirez explained how things turned awry at the film screening:

When the lights came on in the screening room, the silence was deafening. All the execs put down their yellow legal notepads and headed down the hall to the conference room (which for me felt miles away). When we all sat down, Jeffrey looked up and said three words: "Nothing made sense". He was right. Nothing made sense. We followed the Bible story tightly. The script had structure. We storyboarded it word for word, yet it fell flat on its face. It all suddenly felt like a horrible, horrible disaster, and the worst part of it all was that I didn't know how to fix it. I was deeply confused, and our aggressive production schedule didn't allow for the story re-working that usually takes place on a theatrical feature. Share Stallings, one of our creative executives on the project, was very supportive and offered encouragement to the crew. She assured me that at least two sequences could be saved by clarifying some visuals and re-writing some dialogue. I couldn't see it at the time, although she turned out to be right. The only thing I could think about was that "nothing made sense".

=== Cracking the story ===
Ramirez explained that they cracked the story by returning to the basics of storytelling:

When we started analyzing the characters in Joseph, we began to work from the inside out as opposed to just putting together a story. Once we delved into the minds of these characters and dissected their personalities, we started making some important breakthroughs. What does Joseph want? To be a part of his brothers' lives and reunite with his family. What does Judah, Joseph's older brother, want? He wants the love and positive attention that his father Jacob reserves only for Joseph. What does Jacob want? Jacob wants to show the world how much he loves his favorite son, Joseph. Why does Jacob love Joseph so much more than his other sons? Because Joseph is the spitting image of his favorite wife. He's the first-born son of the woman he waited for all his life to marry. Once we discovered the "wants" of the main characters, it was simple to figure out what actions they would take to satisfy them. Another important discovery was finding the voice of each individual. Once we had a deeper understanding of our characters and what made them tick, the scenes had a new spark of life that had been missing all along. The characters were now driving the scenes, instead of vice versa. In time, ideas that were born out of character helped blend sequences so that they flowed into each other instead of feeling disconnected.

=== Casting and approach to characters ===
Mark Hamill, who was cast as Judah, Joseph's elder brother, explained the choices he made regarding his character:

Judah starts out at a high station in his family structure, and that's all disrupted by this little child who claims to have visions of the future, he says. Eventually, it causes Judah to lead all the brothers against Joseph. I don't think of him as a villain. In many ways, he's like all people, wondering, "How will this affect my own life?" He's self-centered and has to re-evaluate all his preconceived notions.

Ramirez explained one of the main themes in the film by analyzing how Joseph reacts upon seeing his brothers for the first time after they sold him into slavery:

These 'strangers' turned out to be his brothers. Now it was Joseph's turn. Would he follow his initial gut instinct and enslave them? Abuse them? Kill them? Or would he rise above hatred and forgive them? In a nutshell, that's what the crux of the story is about: forgiveness.

Jodi Benson was thrilled to be cast as Joseph's wife, Asenath, after seeing the work that had been done with Moses in The Prince of Egypt. Benson didn't audition for the part, and was instead offered it. Unlike some of the other characters, she provides both the speaking and singing voices in her role. It took twelve days to record her lines, and the only other voice actor she worked with was the singing voice for Joseph, David Campbell. Benson explained her character is the "voice of reason and the voice of trying to do the right thing to reconcile [Joseph] with his brothers". Her character was given a much larger role than what is presented in The Holy Bible.

David Campbell also served as the singing narrator of the film, with most songs being non-diegetic

=== Music ===
Score and songs were released in 2000 in CD format only for promotional purposes without release to a mass audience.

== Release ==
As the first and only DreamWorks Animation direct-to-video film, Joseph: King of Dreams was released by DreamWorks Home Entertainment on VHS and DVD on November 7, 2000. Special features included "Sing-a-long songs, storybook read-a-long programming, an interactive trivia game, and printable activity and coloring sheets". The film was released by 20th Century Fox Home Entertainment on DVD on May 13, 2014, as part of a triple film set, along with DreamWorks Animation's The Road to El Dorado (2000) and Sinbad: Legend of the Seven Seas (2003). The film was re-released by Universal Pictures Home Entertainment on DVD on June 5, 2018, and released on Blu-ray for the first time on January 22, 2019.

The direct-to-video film was "made available to Christian retailers, but mainly [would] be sold in traditional retailers such as Walmart and Target and video stores." The financial success of Joseph would to some degree influence whether more animated Bible stories would be released by DreamWorks.

=== Book tie-ins ===
Nashville publisher Tommy Nelson, the kids division of the Christian publishing company Thomas Nelson, partnered DreamWorks to publish four companion book titles based on the film, and has exclusive publishing rights to Joseph ("a read-along tape, a sticker storybook, a 48-page hardcover storybook with illustrations from the film, and a smaller hardcover storybook which retells the story of Joseph"). One of them, My Sticker Storybook: Joseph and his Brothers (published on November 1, 2000) was a sticker storybook that followed the plot Joseph, and was written by Dandi Daley Mackall. The 48-page storybook (published on November 1, 2000, and sometimes subtitled "Classic Edition") featured images from the film, a retelling by Mackall, and was a "stand-alone book, as well as a splendid companion to the video", also written by Mackall. Joseph, King of Dreams: read-along (published on March 8, 2001) was a full-color storybook and accompanying cassette which "capture[d] all the emotional and dramatic high points". Written by Catherine McCafferty, it included the song "Better Than I" and dialogue from the film. A fourth book was published as well.

Chick-fil-A sold five storybooks based on the film during a five-week period.

== Reception ==
=== Critical response ===
You Know Better Than I, performed by David Campbell, was critically acclaimed by many critics.

While praising the film's merits including animation, storytelling, and music, much of the criticism came with comparing it negatively to its theatrically released predecessor The Prince of Egypt. The song You Know Better Than I was singled out for praise by numerous critics, as were the van Gogh-inspired dream sequences. Many noted that the animated hieroglyph effects were similar to those from Prince, and suggested that the film stuck closer to the Bible source material than the previous film had.

DecentFilmsGuide gave the film a B for Overall Recommendability and 3/4 stars for Artistic/Entertainment Value. They commented that the dream sequences look like "living, flowing Van Goghs", but they also wrote that Joseph: King of Dreams is not in the same class as The Prince of Egypt and considered it more as children's film. It said that the songs "while cheerful and uplifting, are generally unmemorable", and described the animation as "fine but not wonderful". It noted that "once one stops making unfair comparisons to a theatrical film made on a much bigger budget, Joseph: King of Dreams is very much worthwhile on its own more modest terms". Nevertheless, the review complimented the "ominous tune' Marketplace, and said that "in one small way, Joseph: King of Dreams even outshines the earlier film: the spirituality of its signature song, You Know Better Than I, is much more profound than anything in the more mainstream "There Can Be Miracles". DVD Verdict wrote that Joseph: King of Dreams will shatter anyone's expectations about direct-to-video animated features, also saying that this is not a "halfhearted" attempt to cash in on the success of The Prince of Egypt, but instead a fully realized and carefully crafted story of its own. Despite noting a short film's length, they praised its animation, music, and storytelling. PluggedIn wrote "while not as eye-popping as Prince of Egypt, the film is impressive for a direct-to-video title". They praised "artfully executed" dream sequences, film songs as "uplifting" and noted that the film took fewer liberties than its predecessor. Lakeland Ledger said: "At its best, the story communicated the sense of desperation and yearning that make up the tale and provides a sense of the emotions that underscore the story". Jan Crain Rudeen of Star-News gave a positive review to the film.

The Movie Report gave the film 3/4 stars, writing that "while clearly not on the level of that 1998 classic, it is a solid piece of work that is about on par with the SKG's spring theatrical release The Road to El Dorado". They were however critical to the songs and music, with the exception of You Know Better Than I. ChristianAnswers.net gave the film 4/5 stars, commenting while visual effects are not as outstanding as in The Prince of Egypt, the storyline does stay closer to the biblical version. The site also praised the music and the song You Know Better Than I. CommonSenseMedia rated the film 3/5 stars, praising the animation and its "compelling" dream sequences, but noted that it lacks The Prince of Egypt's poignant tunes and powerful storytelling. The Los Angeles Times wrote that film "with its beautiful, big-screen quality, flowing animation and striking computer-generated imagery—and with its dignity and heart—is a fine telling of the biblical story". Variety said that King of Dreams has much cross-generational appeal as its predecessor and called it an "entertainment" for whole family.

=== Accolades ===
Year	Nominee / work	Award	Result
2000	"Better Than I"	Video Premier Award for Best Song	Won
2001	Joseph: King of Dreams	Silver Angel Award for Feature Film	Nominated
2001	Joseph: King of Dreams	Annie Award for Outstanding Achievement in an Animated Home Video Production	Nominated
2001	Penney Finkelman Cox (executive producer); Steve Hickner (executive producer); Jeffrey Katzenberg (executive producer); Ken Tsumura (producer)	DVD Exclusive Video Premiere Award for Best Animated Video Premiere	Won
2001	Eugenia Bostwick-Singer; Marshall Goldberg; Raymond Singer; Joe Stillman	DVD Exclusive Video Premiere Award for Best Screenplay	Won
2001	Ben Affleck (voice); Luc Chamberland (animation director: Joseph)	DVD Exclusive Video Premiere Award for Best Animated Character Performance	Nominated
2001	Rob LaDuca; Robert C. Ramirez	DVD Exclusive Video Premiere Award for Best Directing	Nominated
2001	Daniel Pelfrey	DVD Exclusive Video Premiere Award for Best Original Score	Nominated

== See also ==
- List of films featuring slavery
- Joseph: Beloved Son, Rejected Slave, Exalted Ruler
