= Joseph (Genesis) =

Biblical figure, son of Jacob and Rachel

- יוֹסֵף
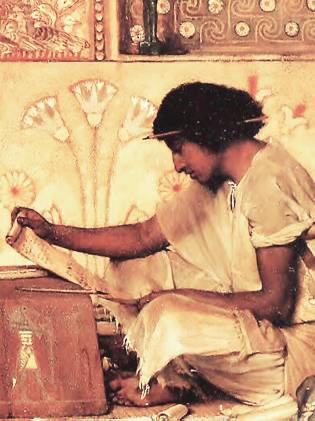
- Joseph Overseer of the Pharaoh's Granaries (1874) by Lawrence Alma-Tadema
- Born: Paddan Aram, Aram-Naharaim (present-day Harran, Turkey)
- Died: Ancient Egypt
- Resting place: Joseph's Tomb, Nablus, West Bank (disputed); 32°12′47″N 35°16′58″E
- Other name: Zaphnath-Paaneah (צָפְנַת פַּעְנֵחַ)
- Spouse: Asenath
- Children: Manasseh (son); Ephraim (son)
- Parents: Jacob (father); Rachel (mother)
- Relatives: Reuben (half-brother); Simeon (half-brother); Levi (half-brother); Judah (half-brother); Dan (half-brother); Naphtali (half-brother); Gad (half-brother); Asher (half-brother); Issachar (half-brother); Zebulun (half-brother); Dinah (half-sister); Benjamin (brother); Abraham (great-grandfather); Sarah (great-grandmother); Potipherah (father-in-law); Isaac (grandfather); Rebecca (grandmother); Esau (uncle); Ishmael (great half-uncle)

Joseph (/ˈdʒoʊzəf, -səf/; Hebrew: יוֹסֵף, romanized: Yōsēp̄, lit. 'He shall add') (Note: Standard: Yōsef, Tiberian: Yōsēp̄; alternatively: יְהוֹסֵף, lit. 'Yahweh shall add'; Standard: Yəhōsef, Tiberian: Yŏhōsēp̄; Arabic: يوسف, romanized: Yūsuf; Ancient Greek: Ἰωσήφ, romanized: Iōsēph) was a dream interpreter and considered an important Hebrew figure in the Bible's Book of Genesis.

Joseph was the first of the two sons of Jacob and Rachel, making him Jacob's twelfth named child and eleventh son. He is the founder of the Tribe of Joseph among the Israelites. His story functions as an explanation for Israel's residence in Egypt. He is the favourite son of the patriarch Jacob, and his envious brothers sell him into slavery in Biblical Egypt, where he eventually ends up incarcerated. After correctly interpreting the dreams of Pharaoh, he rises to second-in-command in Egypt and saves Egypt during a famine. Jacob's family travels to Egypt to escape the famine, and it is through him that they are given leave to settle in the Land of Goshen (the eastern part of the Nile Delta).

Scholars hold different opinions about the historical background of the Joseph story, as well as the date and development of its composition. Some scholars suggest that the Joseph cycle, i.e. the biblical story of Joseph in Genesis 37-50, (Note: Excluding chapter 38, which is concerned with Judah and Tamar.) was a multigenerational work with both early and late components. Others hold that the original Joseph story was a Persian period diaspora novella told from the perspective of Judeans living in Egypt.

In Jewish tradition, he is the ancestor of a second Messiah called "Mashiach ben Yosef", who will wage war against the forces of evil alongside Mashiach ben David and die in combat with the enemies of God and Israel. Christian tradition often interprets him as a typological precursor to Jesus, emphasizing his virtue and suffering. In Islam, Joseph (Yusuf) is regarded as a prophet, and the Quran recounts his story with some variations, such as the healing of Jacob’s eyes. The Bahá’í faith also references Joseph metaphorically in relation to recognizing manifestations of God. Beyond religious texts, Joseph’s story has inspired extensive literature, music, theater, film and television adaptations.

== Etymology ==
The Bible offers two explanations of the name Yosēf: first, it is compared to the triliteral א־ס־ף (ʾ-s-p), meaning "to gather, remove, take away": "And she conceived, and bore a son; and said, God hath taken away my reproach" (Genesis 30:23); Yosēf is then identified with the similar root יסף (y-s-p), meaning "to add": "And she called his name Joseph; and said, The LORD shall add to me another son." (Genesis 30:24).

== Biblical narrative ==
=== Birth and family ===
Joseph, son of Jacob and Rachel, lived in the land of Canaan with ten half brothers, one full brother, and at least one half sister. He was Rachel's firstborn and Jacob's eleventh son. Of all the sons, Joseph was preferred by his father, who gave him a "long coat of many colors". (Note: Another possible translation is "coat with long sleeves".(Jastrow 1903))

=== Plot against Joseph ===
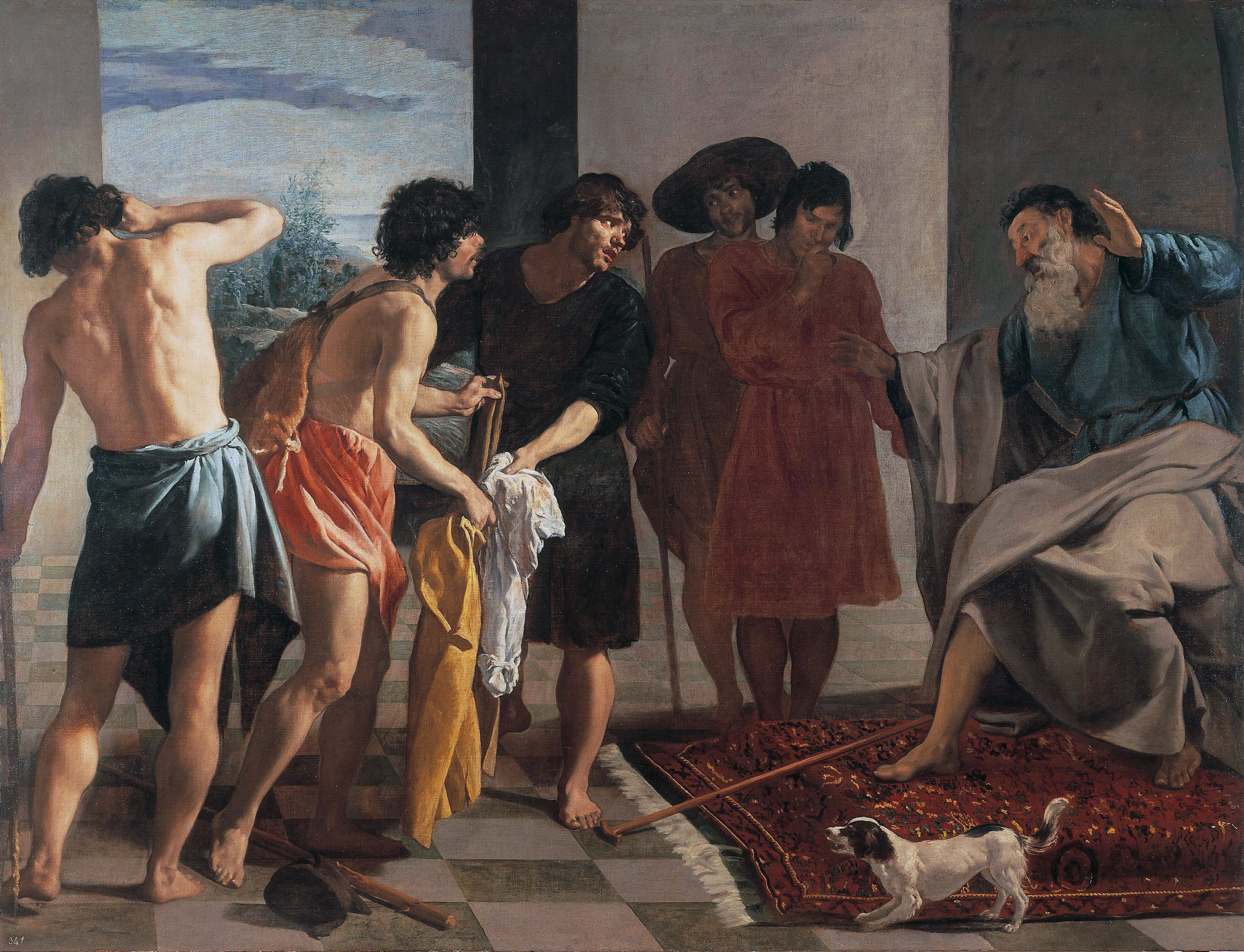
Joseph's Bloody Coat Brought to Jacob by Diego Velázquez, 1630.

Genesis 37, Vayeshev, opens with Joseph and his brothers pasturing Jacob's flock of sheep. He was seventeen years old, and reported critically to Jacob on the actions of his brothers. He then shared with his brothers two dreams he had: in the first dream, Joseph and his brothers gathered bundles of grain, and those gathered by his brothers bowed to his own. In the second dream, the Sun (father), the Moon (mother), and eleven stars (brothers) bowed to Joseph himself. These dreams, implying his supremacy, angered his brothers (Genesis 37:1–11) and made the brothers plot his demise.

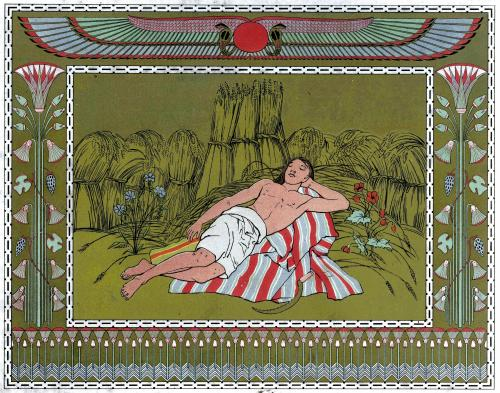
Joseph's dream of grain

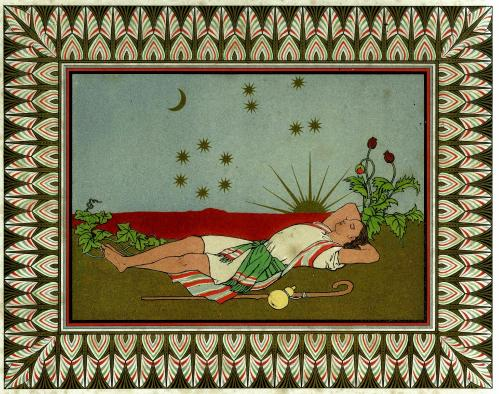
Joseph's dream of stars

Joseph's half brothers were envious of him. Most of them plotted to kill him in Dothan, except Reuben, who suggested they throw Joseph into an empty cistern; he intended to rescue Joseph himself later. Unaware of this plan to rescue Joseph, the others agreed with Reuben. (Note: According to Josephus, Reuben tied a cord around Joseph and let him down gently into the pit. Josephus. Antiquities of the Jews. 2.3.2., Perseus Project AJ2.3.2, .) Upon imprisoning Joseph, the brothers saw a camel caravan carrying spices and perfumes to Egypt, and sold Joseph to these merchants. (Note: The Septuagint sets his price at twenty pieces of gold; the Testament of Gad thirty of gold; the Hebrew and Samaritan twenty of silver; the Vulgar Latin thirty of silver; Josephus at twenty pounds) The guilty brothers painted goat's blood on Joseph's coat and showed it to Jacob, who therefore believed Joseph had died.

=== Potiphar's house ===
In Genesis 39, Vayeshev, Joseph was sold to Potiphar, the captain of Pharaoh's guard. Later, Joseph became Potiphar's servant, and subsequently his household's superintendent. Here, Potiphar's wife (later called Zulaykha) tried to seduce Joseph, whose advances he refused. Angered by his running away from her, she made a false accusation of rape, leading to his imprisonment. (Note: Josephus claims that Potiphar fell for his wife's crocodile tears although he did not believe Joseph capable of the crime.Josephus. Antiquities of the Jews. 2.4.1., Perseus Project AJ2.4.1, .)

=== Joseph in prison ===
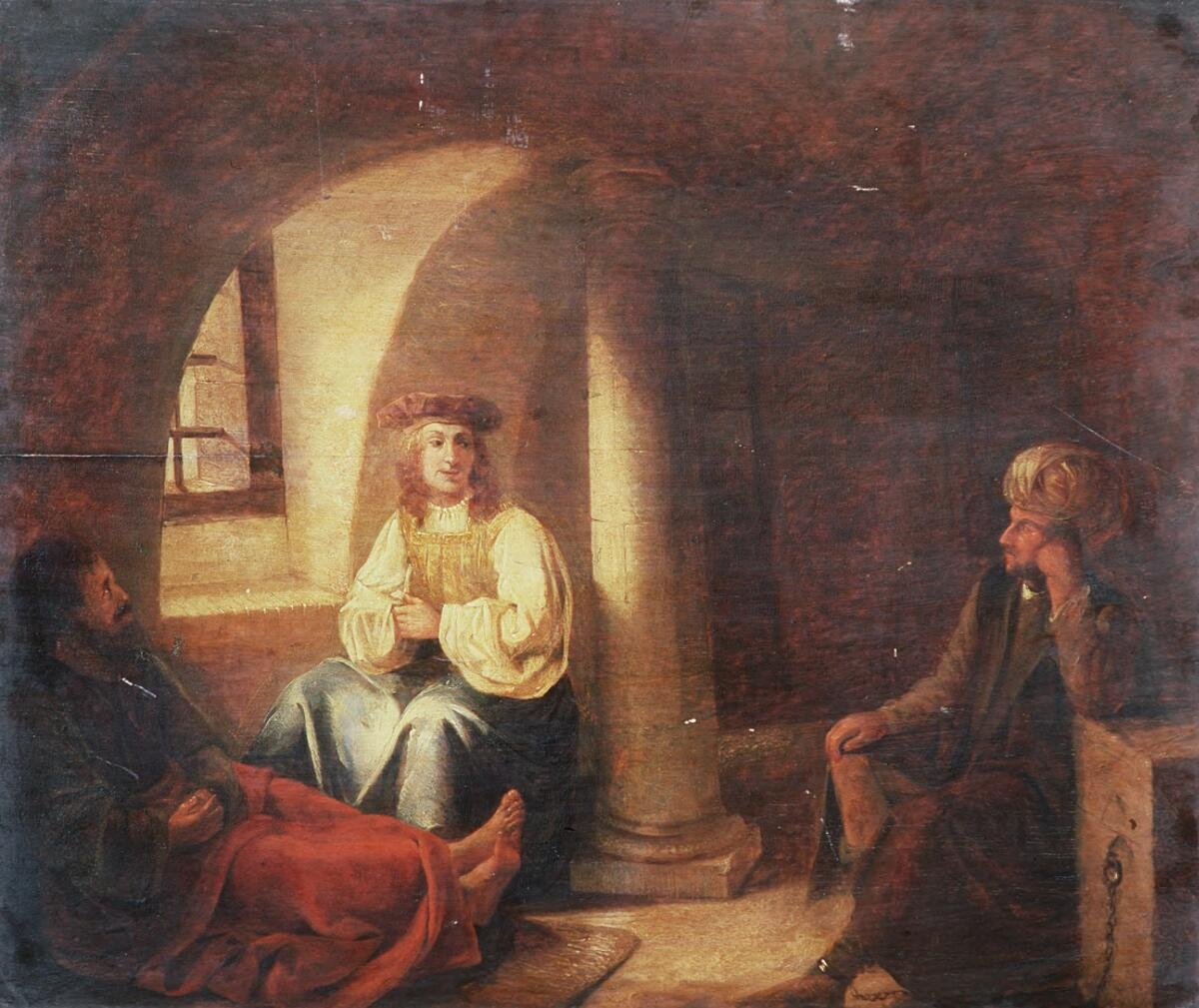
Joseph in prison, by Gerbrand van den Eeckhout, 17th century.

The warden put Joseph in charge of the other prisoners. Soon afterwards, Pharaoh's chief cup-bearer and chief baker, who had offended the Pharaoh, were thrown into the prison. Both men had dreams which they did not understand, and Joseph, being able to interpret dreams, asked to hear them.

The cup-bearer's dream was about a vine with three branches that was budding. And as it was budding, its blossoms came out and they produced grapes. The cup-bearer took those grapes and squeezed them into Pharaoh's cup, and placed the cup in Pharaoh's hand. Joseph interpreted this dream as the cup-bearer being restored as cup-bearer to the Pharaoh within three days.

The baker's dream was about three baskets full of bread for the Pharaoh, and birds were eating the bread out of those baskets. Joseph interpreted this dream as the baker being hanged within three days and having his flesh eaten by birds.

Joseph requested that the cup-bearer mention him to Pharaoh to secure his release from prison, but the cup-bearer, reinstalled in office, forgot Joseph.

After two more years, the Pharaoh dreamt of seven lean cows which devoured seven fat cows; and of seven withered ears of grain which devoured seven fat ears. When the Pharaoh's advisers failed to interpret these dreams, the cup-bearer remembered Joseph. Joseph was then summoned. He interpreted the dream as seven years of abundance followed by seven years of famine and advised the Pharaoh to store surplus grain.

=== Vizier of Egypt ===
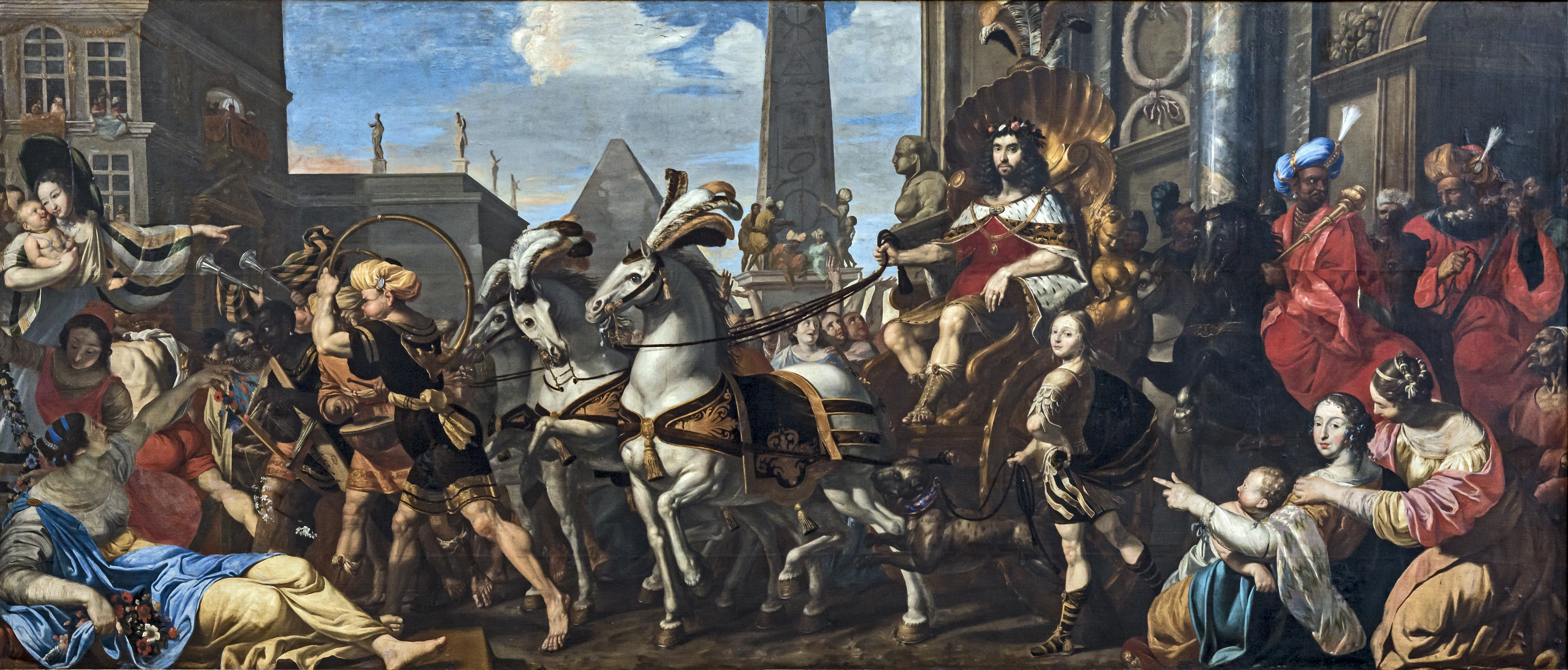
The triumph of Joseph (1657), Toulouse Cathedral.

Following the prediction, Joseph became Vizier, under the name of Zaphnath-Paaneah (Hebrew: צָפְנַת פַּעְנֵחַ Ṣāp̄naṯ Paʿnēaḥ), (Note: Josephus refers to the name Zaphnath-Paaneah as Psothom Phanech meaning "the revealer of secrets" Josephus. Antiquities of the Jews. 2.6.1., Perseus Project AJ2.6.1, .) and was given Asenath, the daughter of Potipherah, priest of On, (Note: Josephus refers to Potipherah (or Petephres) as the priest of Heliopolis. Josephus. Antiquities of the Jews. 2.6.1., Perseus Project AJ2.6.1, .) to be his wife. During the seven years of abundance, Joseph ensured that the storehouses were full and that all produce was weighed. In the sixth year, Asenath bore two children to Joseph: Manasseh and Ephraim. When the famine came, it was so severe that people from surrounding nations came to Egypt to buy bread. The narrative also indicates that they went straight to Joseph or were directed to him, even by the Pharaoh himself (Genesis 41:37–57). As a last resort, all of the inhabitants of Egypt, less the Egyptian priestly class, sold their properties and later themselves (as slaves) to Joseph for seed; wherefore Joseph set a mandate that, because the people would be sowing and harvesting seed on government property, a fifth of the produce should go to the Pharaoh. This mandate lasted until the days of Moses (Genesis 47:20–31).

=== Brothers sent to Egypt ===
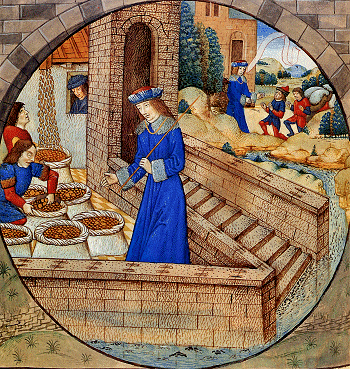
Joseph gave orders to his servants to fill their sacks with wheat: illuminated Bible by Raphaël de Mercatelli, Ghent, late 15th century.

In the second year of famine, Joseph's half brothers were sent to Egypt to buy goods. When they came to Egypt, they stood before the Vizier but did not recognize him as their brother Joseph, who was now in his late 30s; but Joseph did recognize them and did not speak at all to them in his native tongue of Hebrew. After questioning them, he accused them of being spies. After they mentioned a younger brother at home, the Vizier (Joseph) demanded that he be brought to Egypt as a demonstration of their veracity. This was Joseph's full brother, Benjamin. Joseph placed his brothers in prison for three days. On the third day, he brought them out of prison to reiterate that he wanted their youngest brother brought to Egypt to demonstrate their veracity. The brothers conferred amongst themselves speaking in Hebrew, reflecting on the wrong they had done to Joseph. Joseph understood what they were saying and removed himself from their presence because he was caught in emotion. When he returned, the Vizier took Simeon and bound him as a hostage. (Note: William Whiston comments that Simeon was chosen as a pledge for the sons of Israel's return to Egypt because of all the brothers who hated Joseph the most, was Simeon, according to the Testament of Simeon and the Testament of Zebulun. Josephus. Antiquities of the Jews. 2.6.4., Perseus Project AJ2.6.4, . Note 1.) Then he had their donkeys prepared with grain and sent the other brothers back to Canaan. Unbeknownst to them, Joseph had also returned their money to their money sacks (Genesis 42:1–28).

=== The silver cup ===
The remaining brothers returned to their father in Canaan, and told him all that had transpired in Egypt. They also discovered that all of their money sacks still had money in them, and they were dismayed. Then they informed their father that the Vizier demanded that Benjamin be brought before him to demonstrate that they were honest men. Jacob became greatly distressed, feeling deprived of successive sons: Joseph, Simeon, and (prospectively) Benjamin. After they had consumed all of the grain that they brought back from Egypt, Jacob told his sons to go back to Egypt for more grain. With Reuben and Judah's persistence, they persuaded their father to let Benjamin join them for fear of Egyptian retribution (Genesis 42:29–43:15).

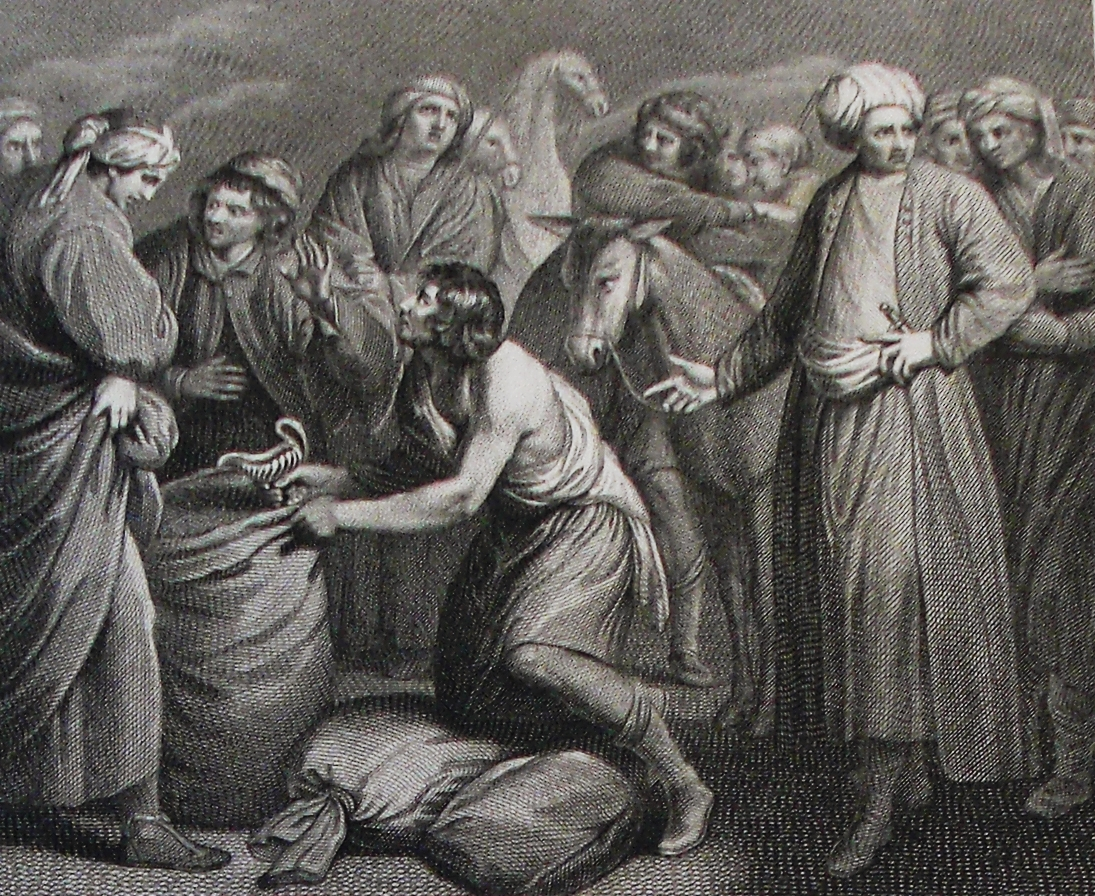
Joseph's cup found in Benjamin's sack, illustration by Philip De Vere.

Upon their return to Egypt, the steward of Joseph's house received the brothers. When they were brought to Joseph's house, they were apprehensive about the returned money in their money sacks. They thought that the missed transaction would somehow be used against them as way to induct them as slaves and to confiscate their possessions. So they immediately informed the steward of what had transpired. The steward put them at ease, telling them not to worry about the money, and brought out their brother Simeon. Then he brought the brothers into the house of Joseph and received them hospitably. When the Vizier (Joseph) appeared, they gave him gifts from their father. Joseph saw and inquired of Benjamin, and was overcome by emotion but did not show it. He withdrew to his chambers and wept. When he regained control of himself, he returned and ordered a meal to be served. The Egyptians would not dine with Hebrews at the same table, as doing so was considered loathsome, thus the sons of Israel were served at a separate table (Genesis 43:16–44:34).

That night, Joseph ordered his steward to load the brothers' donkeys with food and all their money. The money they had brought was double what they had offered on the first trip. Deceptively, Joseph also ordered the steward to put his silver cup in Benjamin's sack. The following morning the brothers began their journey back to Canaan. Joseph ordered the steward to go after the brothers and to question them about the "missing" silver cup. When the steward caught up with the brothers, he seized them and searched their sacks. The steward found the cup in Benjamin's sack - just as he had planted it the night before. This caused a stir amongst the brothers. However, they agreed to be escorted back to Egypt. When the Vizier (Joseph) confronted them about the silver cup, he demanded that the one who possessed the cup in his bag become his slave. In response, Judah pleaded with the Vizier that Benjamin be allowed to return to his father, and that he himself be kept in Benjamin's place as a slave (Genesis 44).

=== Family reunited ===
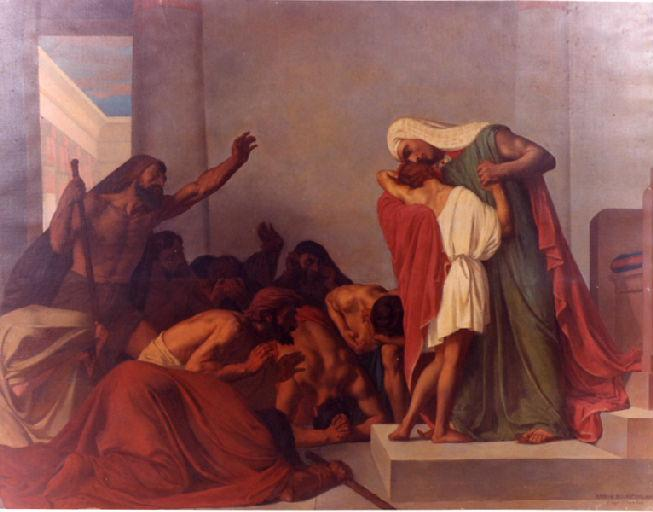
Joseph recognized by his brothers, 1863 painting by Léon Pierre Urbain Bourgeois.

The Vizier broke down into tears. He could not control himself any longer and so he sent the Egyptian men out of the house. Then he revealed to the Hebrews that he was in fact their brother, Joseph. He wept so loudly that even the Egyptian household heard it outside. The brothers were frozen and could not utter a word. He brought them closer and relayed to them the events that had happened and told them not to fear, that what they had meant for evil, God had meant for good. Then he commanded them to go and bring their father and his entire household into Egypt to live in the province of Goshen, because there were five more years of famine left. So Joseph supplied them Egyptian transport wagons, new garments, silver money, and twenty additional donkeys carrying provisions for the journey. (Genesis 45:1–28)

Thus, Jacob (also known as Israel) and his entire house of seventy gathered up with all their livestock and began their journey to Egypt. As they approached Egyptian territory, Judah went ahead to ask Joseph where the caravan should unload. They were directed into the province of Goshen and Joseph readied his chariot to meet his father there. (Note: Josephus has Joseph meeting his father Jacob in Heliopolis, a store-city with Pithom and Raamses, all located in the Egyptian country of Goshen. Josephus. Antiquities of the Jews. 2.7.5., Perseus Project AJ2.7.5, .) It had been over twenty years since Joseph had last seen his father. When they met, they embraced each other and wept together for quite a while. His father then remarked, "Now let me die, since I have seen your face, because you are still alive." (Genesis 46:1–34)

Afterward, Joseph's family personally met the Pharaoh of Egypt. The Pharaoh honoured their stay and even proposed that if there were any qualified men in their house, then they may elect a chief herdsman to oversee Egyptian livestock. Because the Pharaoh had such a high regard for Joseph, practically making him his equal, it had been an honour to meet his father. Thus, Israel was able to bless the Pharaoh (Genesis 47:1–47:12). The family was then settled in Goshen.

=== Father's blessing and passing ===
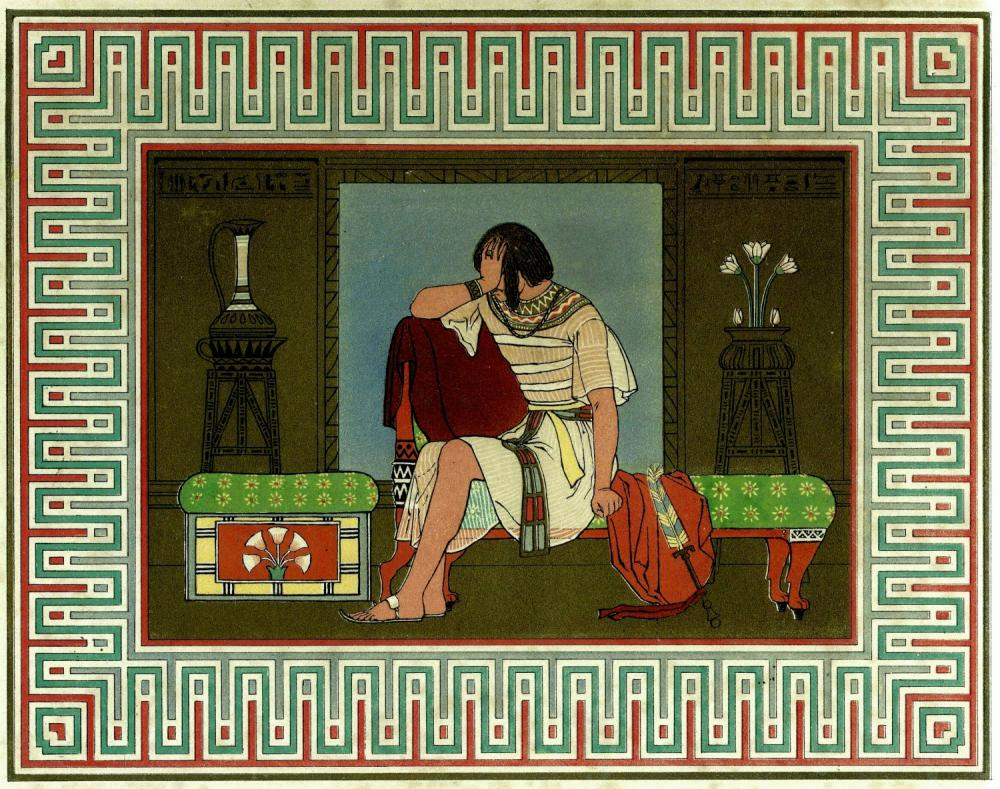
Joseph weeps.

The house of Israel acquired many possessions and multiplied exceedingly during the course of seventeen years, even through the worst of the seven-year famine. At this time, Joseph's father was 147 years old and bedridden. He had fallen ill and lost most of his vision. Joseph was called into his father's house and Israel pleaded with his son that he not be buried in Egypt. Rather, he requested to be carried to the land of Canaan to be buried with his forefathers. Joseph was sworn to do as his father asked of him. (Genesis 47:27–31)

Later, Joseph came to visit his father having with him his two sons, Ephraim and Manasseh. Israel declared that they would be heirs to the inheritance of the house of Israel, as if they were his own children, just as Reuben and Simeon were. Then Israel laid his left hand on the eldest Manasseh's head and his right hand on the youngest Ephraim's head and blessed Joseph. However, Joseph was displeased that his father's right hand was not on the head of his firstborn, so he switched his father's hands. But Israel refused saying, "but truly his younger brother shall be greater than he," a declaration he made just as Israel himself was to his firstborn brother Esau. To Joseph, he gave a portion more of Canaanite property than he had to his other sons; land that he fought for against the Amorites. (Genesis 48:1–22)

Then Israel called all of his sons in and prophesied their blessings or curses to all twelve of them in order of their ages. To Joseph he declared:

Joseph is a fruitful bough, even a fruitful bough by a well; whose branches run over the wall. The archers have sorely grieved him, and shot at him, and hated him: But his bow abode in strength, and the arms of his hands were made strong by the hands of the Mighty God of Jacob (From thence is the Shepherd, the Stone of Israel), Even by the God of your father who shall help thee; and by the Almighty who shall bless thee With blessings of heaven above, Blessings of the deep that lieth under, Blessings of the breasts and of the womb. The blessings of thy father have prevailed above the blessings of my progenitors unto the utmost bound of the everlasting hills. They shall be on the head of Joseph, And on the crown of the head of him that was separate from his brethren.

— Genesis 49:22–26 KJV

After relaying his prophecies, Israel died. The family, including the Egyptians, mourned him seventy days. Joseph had his father embalmed, a process that took forty days. Then he prepared a great ceremonial journey to Canaan leading the servants of the Pharaoh, and the elders of the houses of Israel and Egypt beyond the Jordan River. They stopped at Atad where they observed seven days of mourning. Here, their lamentation was so great that it caught the attention of surrounding Canaanites who remarked "This is a deep mourning of the Egyptians." So they named this spot Abel Mizraim. Then Joseph buried Israel in the cave of Machpelah, the property of Abraham when he bought it from the Hittites. (Genesis 49:33–50:14)

After their father died, the brothers of Joseph feared retribution for being responsible for Joseph's deliverance into Egypt as a slave. Joseph wept as they spoke and told them that what had happened was God's purpose to save lives and the lives of his family. He comforted them and their ties were reconciled. (Genesis 50:15–21)

=== Joseph's burial ===
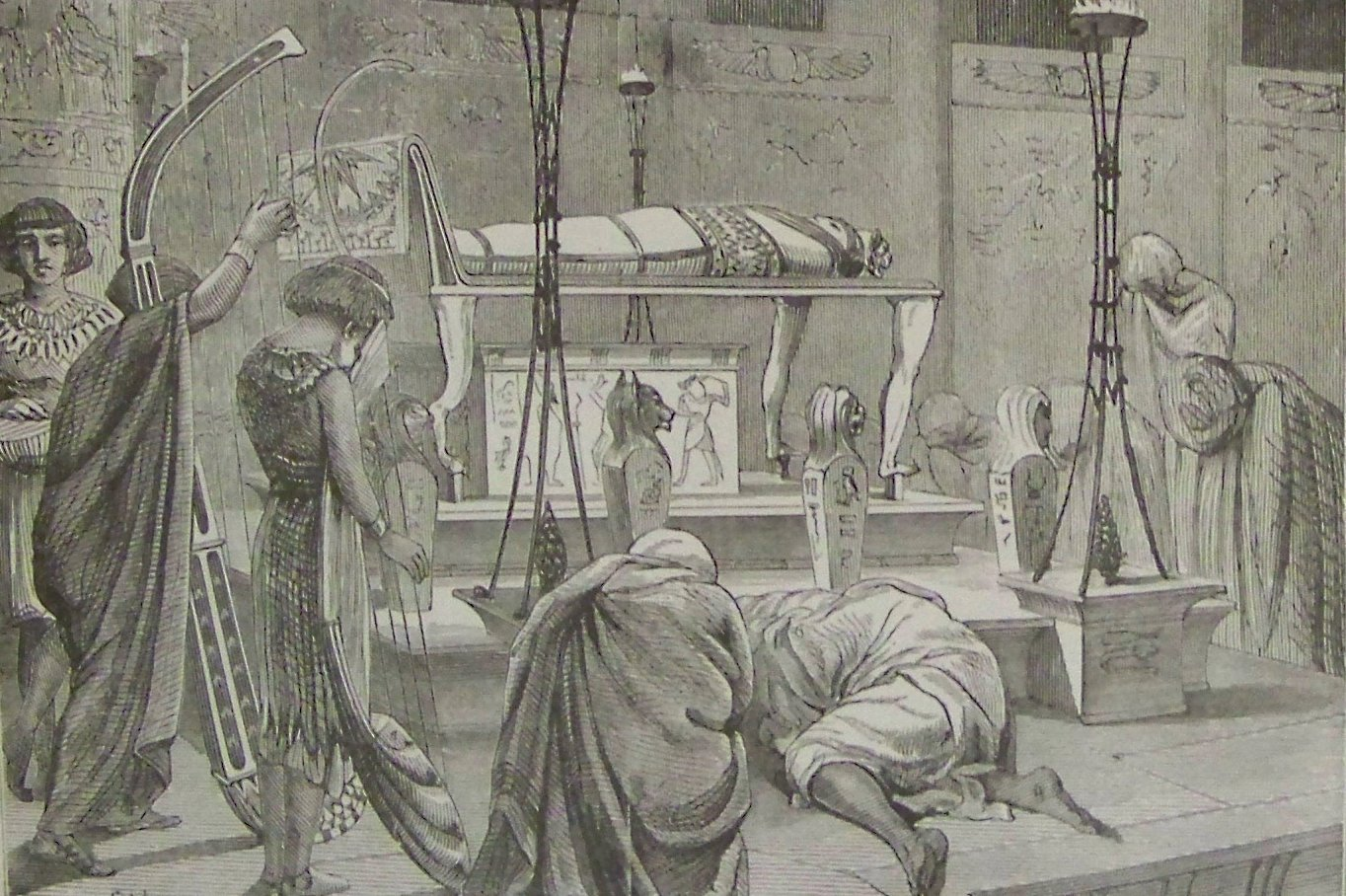
Burying the Body of Joseph (illustration from the 1890 Holman Bible).

Joseph lived to the age of 110, living to see his great-grandchildren. Before he died, he made the children of Israel swear that when they left the land of Egypt they would take his bones with them, and on his death his body was embalmed and placed in a coffin in Egypt. (Genesis 50:22–26)

The children of Israel remembered their oath, and when they left Egypt during the Exodus, Moses took Joseph's bones with him. (Exodus 13:19) The bones were buried at Shechem, in the parcel of ground which Jacob bought from the sons of Hamor (Joshua 24:32), which has traditionally been identified with the site of Joseph's Tomb, before Jacob and all his family moved to Egypt. Shechem was in the land which was allocated by Joshua to the Tribe of Ephraim, one of the tribes of the House of Joseph, after the conquest of Canaan.

== Composition and literary motifs ==
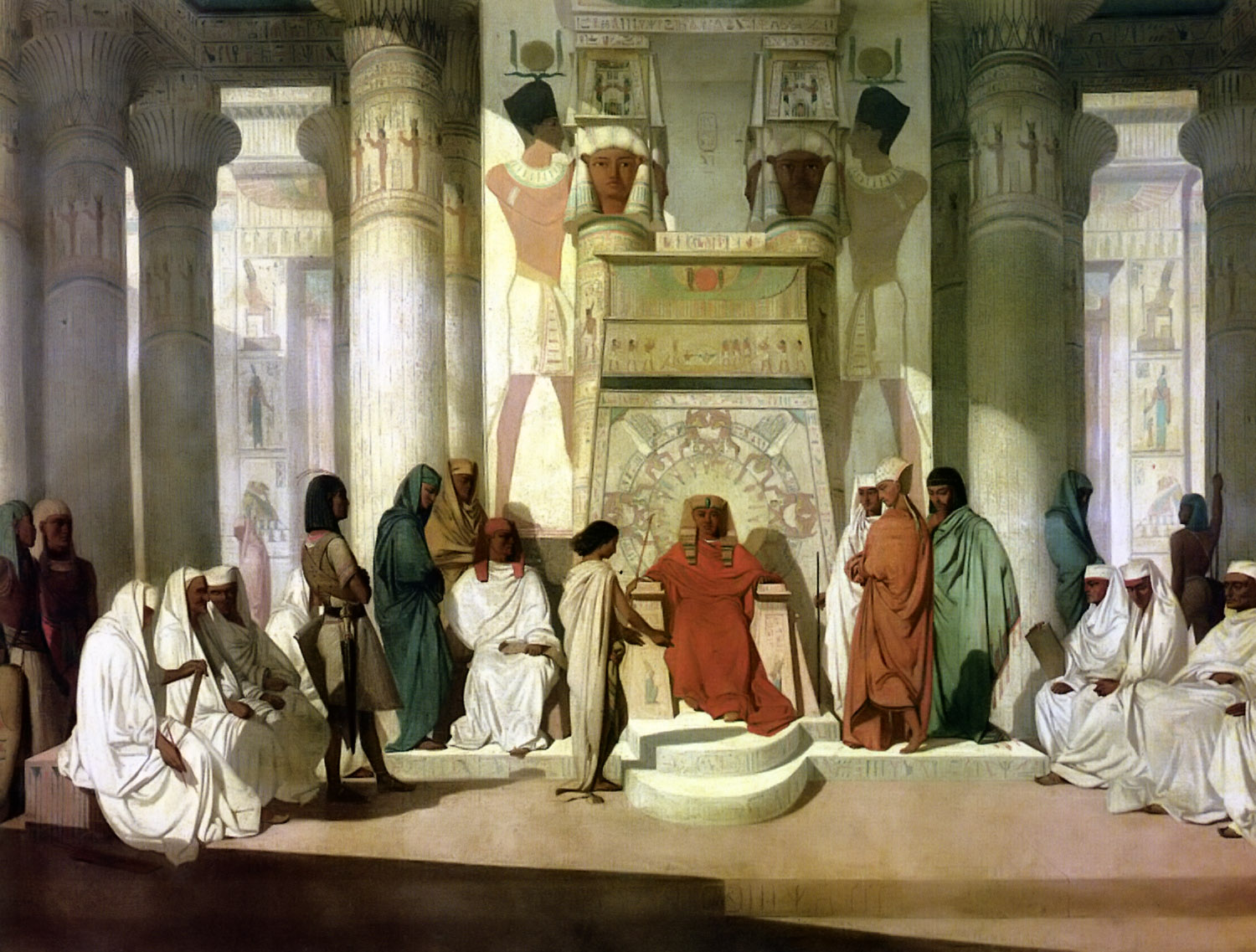
Joseph gives the interpretation of the dream to the Pharaoh in a 19th-century painting by Jean-Adrien Guignet.

In 1970, Donald B. Redford argued that the composition of the story could be dated to the period between the 7th century BCE and the third quarter of the 5th century BCE. By the early 1990s, a majority of modern scholars agreed that the Joseph story was a Wisdom novella constructed by a single author and that it reached its current form in the 5th century BCE at the earliest—with Soggin suggesting the possibility of a first or early second century BCE date. Some scholars argue that the core of the story could be traced back to a 2nd millennium BCE context. Thomas Römer argues that “The date of the original narrative can be the late Persian period, and while there are several passages that fit better into a Greek, Ptolemaic context, most of these passages belong to later revisions.” Camille Guerin indicated the agrarian and political situation that most closely matches the biblical text is the Saite period.

Jan-Wim Wesselius believed that the story of Joseph was partially based on Herodotus' biography of Cyrus the Great; drawing attention to both being raised in a shepherd's household, hidden from family for years, having their futures foretold in dreams, with multicolored garments as infants used to fake a death.

The motif of dreams/dream-interpretation contributes to a strong story-like narrative. The plot begins by showing Joseph as a dreamer; this leads him into trouble as, out of envy, his brothers sell him into slavery. The next two instances of dream interpretation establish his reputation as a great interpreter of dreams; first, he begins in a low place, interpreting the dreams of prisoners. Then Joseph is summoned to interpret the dreams of Pharaoh himself. Impressed with Joseph's interpretations, Pharaoh appoints him as second-in-command (Gen 41:41). This sets up the climax of the story, which many regard as the moment Joseph reveals his identity to his brothers (Gen 45:3).

== Jewish tradition ==
=== Selling Joseph ===
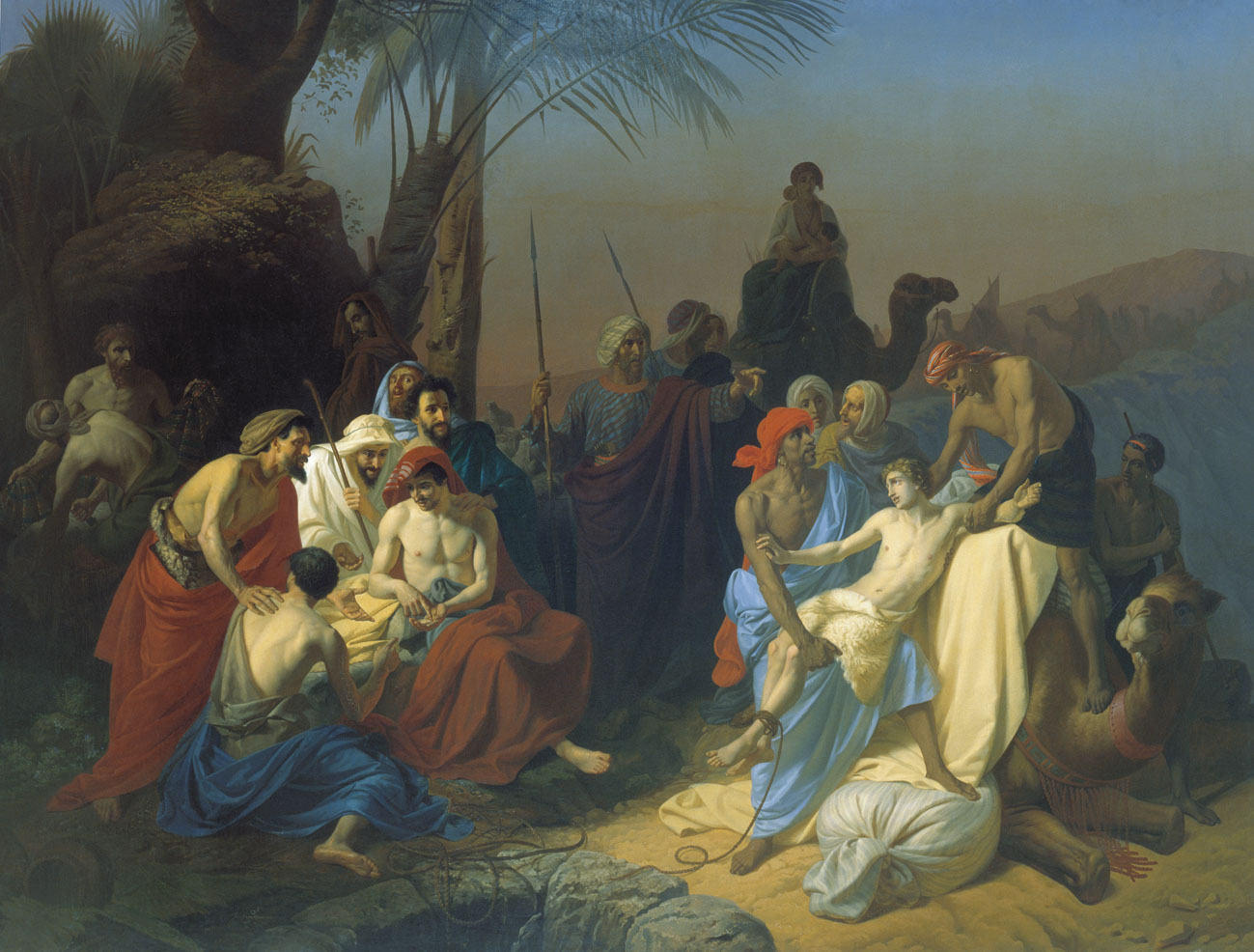
Children of Jacob sell their brother Joseph, by Konstantin Flavitsky, 1855.

In the midrash, the selling of Joseph was part of God's divine plan for him to save his tribes. The favoritism Israel showed Joseph and the plot against him by his brothers were divine means of getting him into Egypt. Maimonides comments that even the villager in Shechem, about whom Joseph inquired his brother's whereabouts, was a "divine messenger" working behind the scene.

A midrash asked, How many times was Joseph sold? In analyzing Genesis Chapter 37, there are five different Hebrew names used to describe five different groups of people involved in the transaction of selling Joseph, according to Rabbi Judah and Rav Huna. The first group identified, are Joseph's brothers when Judah brings up the idea of selling Joseph in verses 26 and 27. The first mention of Ishmaelites (Yishma'elîm) is in verse 25. Then the Hebrew phrase ŉāshîm midyanîm sōĥrîm in verse 28 describes Midianite traders. A fourth group in verse 36 is named in Hebrew as m‘danîm that is properly identified as Medanites. The final group, where a transaction is made, is among the Egyptians in the same verse.

After identifying the Hebrew names, Rabbi Judah claims that Joseph was sold four times: First his brothers sold Joseph to the Ishmaelites (Yishma'elîm), then the Ishmaelites sold him to the Midianite traders (ŉāshîm midyanîm sōĥrîm), the Midianite traders to the Medanites (m‘danîm), and the Medanites into Egypt. Rav Huna adds one more sale by concluding that after the Medanites sold him to the Egyptians, a fifth sale occurred when the Egyptians sold him to Potiphar. (Genesis Rabbah 84:22)

=== Potiphar's wife ===
Joseph had good reasons not to have sexual relations with Potiphar's wife: he did not want to abuse his master's trust; he believed in the sanctity of marriage; and it went against his ethical, moral and religious principles taught to him by his father, Jacob. According to the Midrash, Joseph would have been immediately executed for the sexual assault charge against him by Potiphar's wife. Abravanel explains that she had accused other servants of the same crime in the past. Potiphar believed that Joseph was incapable of such an act, and petitioned Pharaoh to spare his life. However, punishment could not have been avoided because of her class status and limited public knowledge of her scheme.

According to Legends of the Jews, the name of Potiphar's wife was Zuleikha, and when she was enticing Joseph to give in to her sinful passion, God appeared unto him, holding the foundation of earth (Eben Shetiyah), telling him that He would destroy the world if Joseph touched her.

=== Silver cup for divination ===
Jewish tradition holds that Joseph had his steward plant his personal silver cup in Benjamin's sack to test his brothers. He wanted to know if they would be willing to risk danger in order to save their half brother Benjamin. Since Joseph and Benjamin were born from Rachel, this test was necessary to reveal if they would betray Benjamin as they did with Joseph when he was seventeen. Because Joseph the Dreamer predicts the future by analyzing dreams, alternative Jewish tradition claims that he practiced divination using this silver cup as the steward charged and as Joseph himself claimed in Genesis 44:15.

=== Raising Joseph ===
In one Talmudic story, Joseph was buried in the Nile river, as there was some dispute as to which province should be honoured by having his tomb within its boundaries. Moses, led there by an ancient holy woman named Serach, was able by a miracle to raise the sarcophagus and to take it with him at the time of the Exodus.

== Christian tradition ==
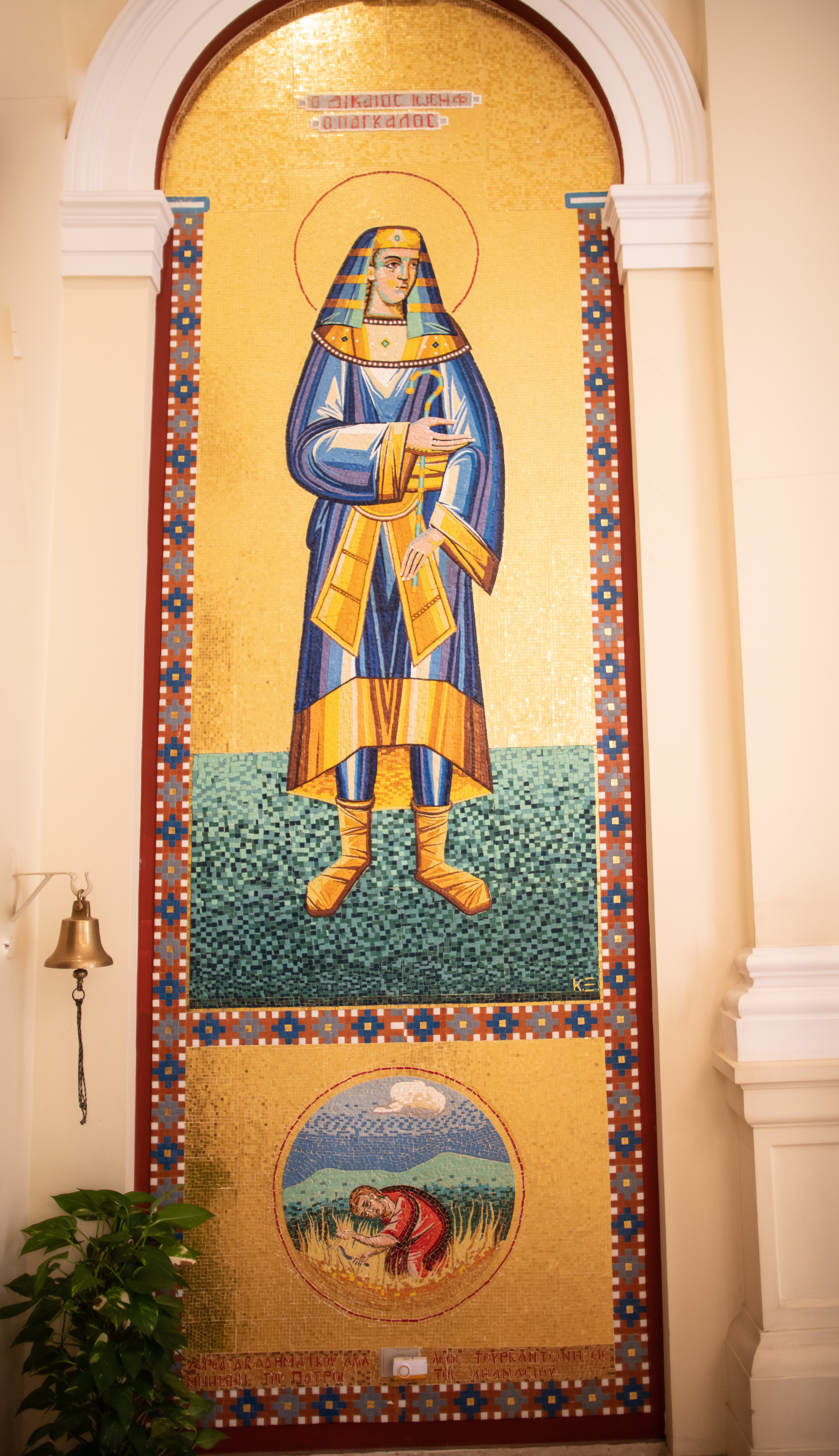
Mosaic depicting Joseph in the Cathedral of Evangelismos.

Joseph is mentioned in the New Testament as an example of faith (Hebrews 11:22). Joseph is commemorated as one of the Holy Forefathers in the Calendar of Saints of the Armenian Apostolic Church on 26 July. In the Eastern Orthodox Church and those Eastern Catholic Churches which follow the Byzantine Rite, he is known as "Joseph the all-comely", a reference not only to his physical appearance, but more importantly to the beauty of his spiritual life. They commemorate him on the Sunday of the Holy Forefathers (two Sundays before Christmas) and on Holy and Great Monday (Monday of Holy Week). In icons, he is sometimes depicted wearing the nemes headdress of an Egyptian vizier. The Lutheran Church–Missouri Synod commemorates him as a patriarch on 31 March.

In addition to honouring him, there was a strong tendency in the patristic period to view his life as a typological precursor to Christ. This tendency is represented in John Chrysostom who said that Joseph's suffering was "a type of things to come", Caesarius of Arles who interpreted Joseph's famous coat as representative of the diverse nations who would follow Christ, Ambrose of Milan who interpreted the standing sheaf as prefiguring the resurrection of Christ, and others.

This tendency, although greatly diminished, was followed throughout late antiquity, the Medieval Era, and into the Reformation. Even John Calvin, sometimes hailed as the father of modern grammatico-historical exegesis, writes "in the person of Joseph, a lively image of Christ is presented".

In addition, some Christian authors have argued that this typological interpretation finds its origin in the speech of Stephen in Acts 7:9–15, as well as the Gospel of Luke and the parables of Jesus, noting strong verbal and conceptual collocation between the Greek translation of the portion of Genesis concerning Joseph and the Parable of the Wicked Tenants and the Parable of the Prodigal Son.

Gregory of Tours claimed that Joseph built the pyramids, and that they were used as granaries.

=== Joseph and Asenath in the reported visions of Anne Catherine Emmerich ===
A proposed Christian interpretation of the Egyptian deities Osiris and Isis appears in the reported visions of the German Catholic mystic Anne Catherine Emmerich (1774–1824). In The Life of Jesus Christ, Volume I, Emmerich describes a connection between the biblical figures Joseph and Asenath and the Egyptian deities Osiris and Isis. According to Emmerich's account, Egyptian astrologers foresaw the coming of Joseph and Aseneth through their visions and incorporated them into Egyptian religion. She describes how they were subsequently honored as divine figures:

I saw that the idols Isis and Osiris were no other than Joseph and Aseneth whose coming into Egypt the astrologers foresaw in their demoniacal visions. They consequently incorporated them into their religion. When they did come, they were honored as divinities. I saw that Aseneth wept over such impiety, and wrote against it.

Emmerich further relates that Aseneth's visions and writings were misunderstood by the Egyptians, leading to her being worshipped under the name of Isis and Joseph under the name of Osiris. She reportedly opposed this interpretation, which had led to her being proclaimed the mother of all the gods.

According to Emmerich's account, Aseneth was the daughter of Dinah, the daughter of Jacob, and a man from Shechem. Following the events at Shechem, she was taken into the household of Potiphera, the Egyptian priest of Heliopolis, who raised her as his adopted daughter. This account offers an explanation for the biblical description of Asenath as the daughter of Potiphera in Genesis 41:45, while assigning her a different biological parentage.

=== Other commentary ===
H. E. Ryle observes that imprisonment was "a less violent [punishment] than we should have expected in such an age" in response to the alleged sexual assault of Potiphar's wife.

Matthew Henry comments on Joseph's compassion towards his fellow prisoners, who were sad, not so much because they were in prison, but because they could not interpret their dreams.

== Islamic tradition ==
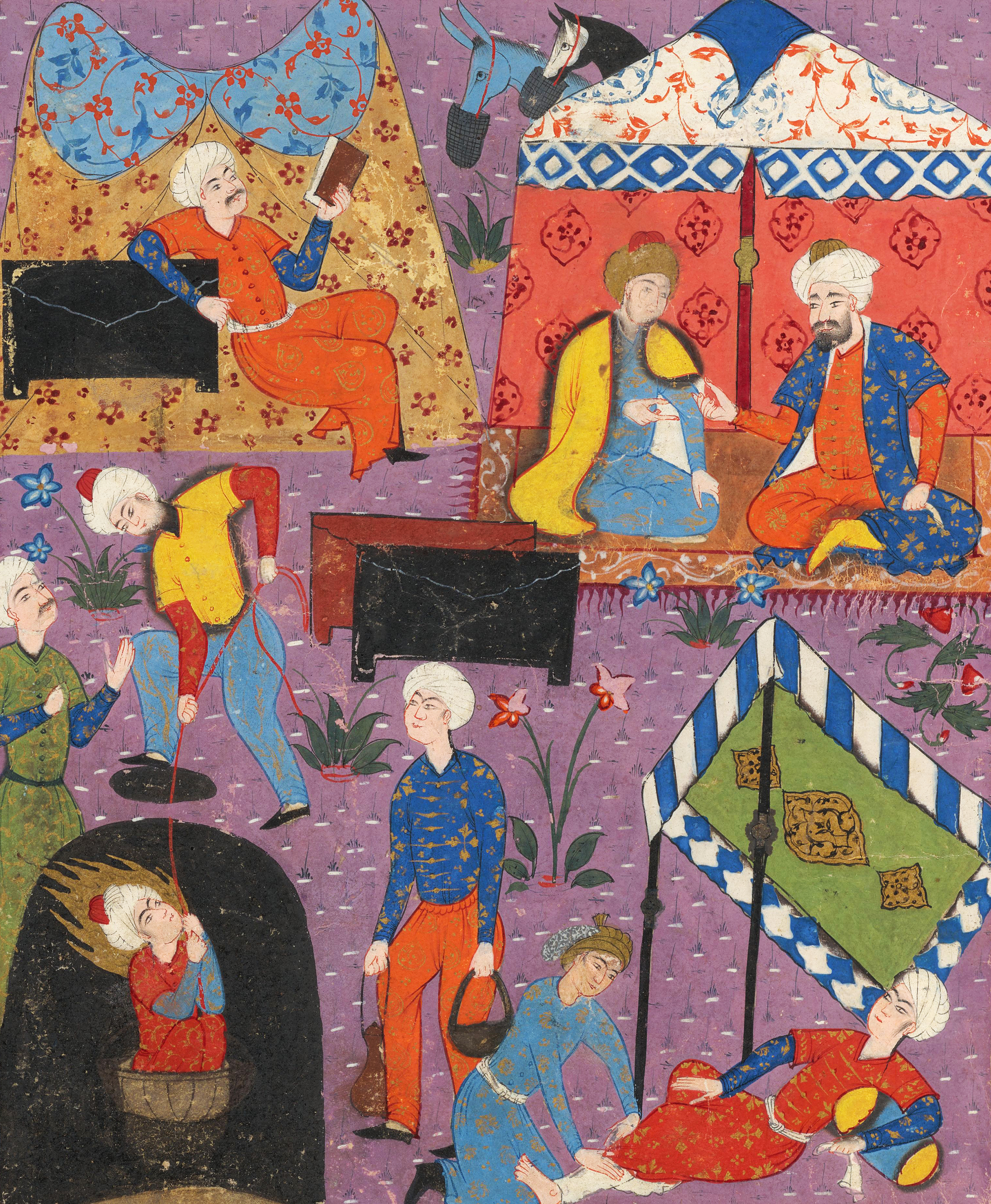
Islamic miniature of Yusuf being lowered into a well by his brothers from a 1577 Stories of the Prophets manuscript.

Joseph (Arabic: يوسُف, Yūsuf) is regarded by the Quran as a prophet (Quran 6:84), and a whole chapter Surah Yusuf 12 is devoted to him, the only instance in the Quran in which an entire chapter is devoted to a complete story of a person. It is described in the Quran as the 'best of stories'. Joseph is said to have been extremely handsome, which attracted his Egyptian master's wife to attempt to seduce him. Muhammad is believed to have once said, "One half of all the beauty God apportioned for mankind went to Joseph and his mother; the other one half went to the rest of mankind." The story has a lot in common with the biblical narrative, but with certain differences. In the Quran the brothers ask Jacob ("Ya'qub") to let Joseph go with them. Joseph is thrown into a well, and taken as a slave by a passing caravan. When the brothers claim to the father that a wolf had eaten Joseph, he observes patience.

In the Bible, Joseph discloses himself to his brethren before they return to their father the second time after buying grain. In the Quran, however, they return having left behind Benjamin because the King’s measuring cup was found in his bag. Similarly, the eldest son of Jacob had decided not to leave the land because of the oath taken to protect Benjamin beforehand. When Jacob learns their story after their return, he cries in grief for so long that he loses his eyesight out of sorrow. He thus charges his sons to go and inquire about Joseph and his brother and despair not of God's mercy. It is during this return to Egypt that Joseph discloses his real identity to his brothers. He admonishes and forgives them, and sends his garment with them, which heals the Jacob's eyes as soon as it is cast unto his face. The remaining verses describe the migration of Jacob's family to Egypt and the emotional meeting of Jacob and his long lost son, Joseph. The family prostrates before him, thus fulfilling of his earlier dream. The story concludes with Joseph praying,

“My Lord! You have surely granted me authority and taught me the interpretation of dreams. ˹O˺ Originator of the heavens and the earth! You are my Guardian in this world and the Hereafter. Allow me to die as one who submits and join me with the righteous.”

— Surah Yusuf 12:101

=== Scholarly comparison of the Quranic Yusuf story to the Biblical Joseph story ===
Many scholars have noted that while the older, Biblical account of the Joseph story is more novelistic and literarily complex, providing many details that were important to Israelites/Jews as part of their "national history", the Quranic version, whose audience did not see itself as related to the characters, serves more as "a moral", meant to "strengthen the hearts" of believers in times of hardship (such as the Meccan period during which it was revealed), and therefore modified and stripped of its wider national and cultural contexts.

== Baha'i tradition ==
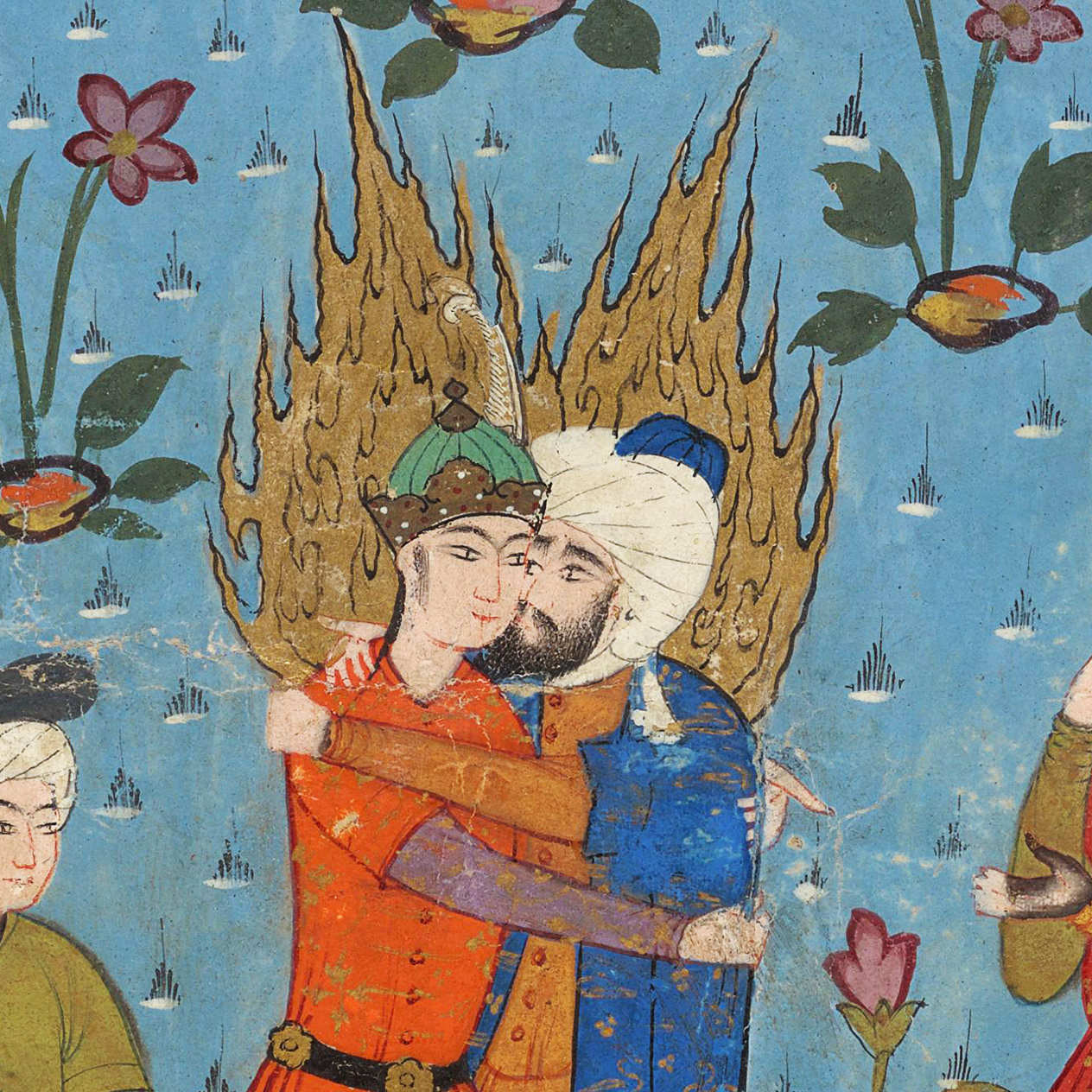
Yusuf (left) is embraced and kissed by his father, who had thought him dead.

There are numerous mentions of Joseph in Bahá'í writings. These come in the forms of allusions written by the Báb and Bahá'u'lláh. In the Kitáb-i-Aqdas, Bahá'u'lláh states that "from my laws, the sweet-smelling savour of my garment can be smelled" and, in the Four Valleys, states that "the fragrance of his garment blowing from the Egypt of Baha," referring to Joseph.

Bahá'í commentaries have described these as metaphors with the garment implying the recognition of a manifestation of God. In the Qayyumu'l-Asma', the Báb refers to Bahá'u'lláh as the true Joseph and makes an analogous prophecy regarding Bahá'u'lláh suffering at the hands of his brother, Mírzá Yahyá.

== Literature and culture ==
- Somnium morale Pharaonis (13th century), by the Cistercian monk Jean de Limoges, is a collection of fictional letters exchanged between the Pharaoh, Joseph, and other characters of the narrative regarding the interpretation of the Pharaoh's dream.
- Joseph and his Brethren, from 1743, an oratorio by George Frideric Handel.
- Omasis, ou, Joseph en Égypte is an 1806 five act tragic play in verse written by Pierre Baour-Lormian
- Joseph (also known as Joseph en Égypte) is an 1807 ópera comique in three acts, composed by Étienne Méhul with a libretto by Alexandre Duval. It was directly inspired by Omasis, ou, Joseph en Égypte.
- Joseph and His Bretheren is a 1906 play by Louis N. Parjer. It's a biblical pageant for a large cast with four acts, thirteen scenes and eleven settings. The incidental music was written by Arthur Farwell. It premiered on Broadway in 1913 where the role of Joseph was played by Brandon Tynan.
- Josephslegende (The Legend of Joseph) is a 1914 work by Richard Strauss for the Ballets Russes.
- Yoysef in Mirsrain (English: Joseph in the Land of Egypt) is an American Yiddish-language 1932 film directed by George Roland and starring Joseph Green as Joseph. It's considered to be the first talkie filmed in Yiddish.
- Joseph and His Brothers (1933–1943), a four-novel omnibus by Thomas Mann, retells the Genesis stories surrounding Joseph, identifying Joseph with the figure of Osarseph known from Josephus, and the pharaoh with Akhenaten. Mann considered it his magnum opus.
- In the 1961 Yugoslavian/Italian film, The Story of Joseph and His Brethren (Giuseppe Venduto dai Fratelli) Joseph is played by Geoffrey Horne.
- The long-running musical Joseph and the Amazing Technicolor Dreamcoat by Andrew Lloyd Webber and Tim Rice is based on the biblical story of Joseph, as far as Genesis 46. It was adapted into the 1999 film of the same name.
- In the 1974 film, The Story of Jacob and Joseph he is portrayed by Tony Lo Bianco.
- The 1979, New Media Bible Genesis Project (TV)-cap. Joseph And His Brothers
- المهاجر (English: The Emigrant) is a 1994 Egyptian film by Youssef Chahine the plot of which is inspired by/loosely based on the story of Joseph. It's considered one of the best Egyptian films of all time.
- In 1995, Turner Network Television released the made-for-television film Joseph starring Ben Kingsley as Potiphar, Lesley Ann Warren as Potiphar's wife, Paul Mercurio as Joseph and Martin Landau as Jacob.
- The Red Tent is a 1997 novel by Anita Diamant focused on Joseph's half sister Dinah. It was adapted for television as a two-part miniseries of the same name in 2014. Joseph himself appears as a secondary character in both the book and its adaptation and is portrayed in the series by Will Tudor.
- The film Joseph's Gift from 1999 sets the story in the modern day and makes Jacob and his family the owners of a successful business in Los Angeles' garment district. Freddy Rodríguez plays Joseph.
- In 2000, DreamWorks Animation released a direct-to-video animated musical film based on the life of Joseph, titled Joseph: King of Dreams. American actor Ben Affleck provided the speaking voice of Joseph, and the Australian singer David Campbell doubled as singing voice of Joseph and the singing narrator of the film.
- The 2003 VeggieTales children's video The Ballad of Little Joe retells Joseph's Genesis stories in the style and setting of an American Western film.
- Prophet Joseph (2008–2009) is a popular Iranian television series, directed by Farajollah Salahshoor, which tells the story of Prophet Joseph based on the Quran.
- Joseph in Egypt: A Cultural Icon from Grotius to Goethe by Bernhard Lang, from 2009, discusses the cultural impact of the Joseph story in early-modern times.
- Rappresentatione di Giuseppe e i suoi Fratelli/Joseph and his Brethren is a musical drama in three acts composed by Elam Rotem for ensemble Profeti della Quinta (2013, Pan Classics).
- José do Egito (English: Joseph of Egypt) is a Brazilian miniseries produced and broadcast by RecordTV. It premiered on January 30, 2013, and ended on October 9, 2013. It is based on the biblical account, with Joseph played by Ângelo Paes Leme as an adult and by Ricky Tavares in his younger years.
- The 2015 animated film Joseph: Beloved Son, Rejected Slave, Exalted Ruler is based on the life of Joseph. American voice actor Mike McFarland provides the speaking voice of Joseph.
- The 2019 novel Joseph and the Way of Forgiveness by Stephen Mitchell retells the story of Joseph in the form of a midrash with emphasis on the thoughts and beliefs of a flawed Joseph.
- Gênesis (English: Genesis) is a Brazilian telenovela produced and broadcast by RecordTV. Divided into seven phases or parts, the series tells the story of the entire biblical book of Genesis, focusing specifically on Joseph in the last one, subtitled José do Egito (English: Joseph of Egypt). Joseph is played by Juliano Laham as an adult and by João Guilherme Chaseliov as a child.

== See also ==
- Book of Joseph (Latter Day Saints)
- Divination
- Dream-interpretation
- Joseph's tomb
- List of slaves
- Yousuf-e Payambar
- Yusufzai
