= Stephen Mitchell (translator) =

American poet and anthologist

Stephen Mitchell (born 1943) is a poet, translator, scholar, and anthologist. Born in Brooklyn, Mitchell is known for his translations and adaptions of works including the Tao Te Ching, the Hebrew Bible's book of Psalms, the Epic of Gilgamesh, works of Rainer Maria Rilke, and some Christian texts.

== Education ==
Stephen Mitchell was born to a Jewish family, educated at Poly Prep, Amherst College, the University of Paris, and Yale University. He studied with Zen master Seungsahn and with Robert Baker Aitken Rōshi.

== Career ==
Mitchell's translations and adaptions include the Tao Te Ching, which has sold over a million copies, Gilgamesh, the Iliad, the Odyssey, The Gospel According to Jesus, the Bhagavad Gita, the Book of Job, the Second Book of the Tao, and The Selected Poetry of Rainer Maria Rilke. He twice won the Harold Morton Landon Translation Award from the Academy of American Poets. His Selected Rilke has been called "the most beautiful group of poetic translations [the twentieth] century has produced" (Chicago Tribune), his Gilgamesh was runner-up for the first annual Quill Award for poetry, and his Iliad was one of The New Yorker's Favorite Books of 2011.

He is also the coauthor of three of his wife Byron Katie's bestselling books: Loving What Is, A Thousand Names for Joy, and A Mind at Home with Itself. His 2019 book Joseph and the Way of Forgiveness is a Zen-inflected midrash on the Joseph story from the book of Genesis. Additionally, he wrote a reimagining of the Christian Nativity story entitled The First Christmas.

== Personal life ==
Mitchell is married to Byron Katie, founder and promoter of the self-inquiry method "The Work".

== Books ==
=== Poetry ===
- Parables and Portraits, HarperCollins, 1990, ISBN 0-06-092532-9

=== Fiction ===
- The First Christmas, St. Martin's Essentials, 2021, ISBN 978-1-250-79069-9
- Joseph and the Way of Forgiveness, St. Martin's Essentials, 2019, ISBN 978-1-250-23989-1
- The Frog Prince: A Fairy Tale for Consenting Adults, Harmony Books, 1999, ISBN 0-609-60545-3
- Meetings with the Archangel: A Comedy of the Spirit, HarperCollins, 1998, ISBN 0-06-018245-8

=== Nonfiction ===
- A Mind at Home with Itself: How Asking Four Questions Can Free Your Mind, Open Your Heart, and Turn Your World Around, by Byron Katie with Stephen Mitchell, HarperOne, 2017, ISBN 0062651609
- A Thousand Names for Joy: Living in Harmony with the Way Things Are (with Byron Katie), Harmony Books, 2007, ISBN 0-307-33923-8
- Loving What Is: Four Questions That Can Change Your Life (with Byron Katie), Harmony Books, 2002, ISBN 1-4000-4537-1
- The Gospel According to Jesus, Harper Perennial, 1993, ISBN 0-06-092321-0

=== Translations and adaptations ===
- Catullus: Selected Poems, Yale University Press, April 2024, ISBN 978-0300275292
- Beowulf, Yale University Press, October, 2017, ISBN 978-0-3002-2888-5
- The Odyssey, Atria Books (Simon & Schuster), 2013, ISBN 978-1-4516-7417-0
- The Iliad, Free Press, 2011, ISBN 978-1-4391-6337-5
- The Second Book of the Tao, Penguin Press, 2009, ISBN 1-59420-203-6
- Gilgamesh: A New English Version, Free Press, 2004, ISBN 0-7432-6169-0
- Bhagavad Gita: A New Translation, Harmony Books, 2002, ISBN 0-609-81034-0
- Real Power: Business Lessons from the Tao Te Ching (with James A. Autry), Riverhead Books, 1998, ISBN 1-57322-089-2
- Full Woman, Fleshly Apple, Hot Moon: Selected Poems of Pablo Neruda, HarperCollins, 1997, ISBN 0-06-018285-7
- Genesis: A New Translation of the Classic Biblical Stories, HarperCollins, 1996, ISBN 0-06-092856-5
- Ahead of All Parting: The Selected Poetry and Prose of Rainer Maria Rilke, Modern Library, 1995, 0-67-960161-9
- A Book of Psalms: Selected and Adapted from the Hebrew, Harper Perennial, 1994, ISBN 0-06-092470-5
- The Selected Poetry of Dan Pagis, University of California Press, 1996, ISBN 0-520-20539-1
- Tao Te Ching, HarperCollins, 1988, hardcover ISBN 0-06-016001-2, paperback ISBN 0-06-016001-2, ISBN paperback P.S. edition 0-06-114266-2, pocket edition ISBN 0-06-081245-1, illustrated edition ISBN 0-7112-1278-3
- The Book of Job, Harper Perennial, 1992, ISBN 0-06-096959-8
- The Selected Poetry of Yehuda Amichai (with Chana Bloch), University of California Press, 1996, ISBN 0-520-20538-3
- The Sonnets to Orpheus by Rainer Maria Rilke, Simon & Schuster, 1985, ISBN 0-671-55708-4
- The Lay of the Love and Death of Cornet Christoph Rilke by Rainer Maria Rilke, Graywolf Press, 1985, ISBN 0-910457-02-6
- Letters to a Young Poet by Rainer Maria Rilke, Random House, 1984, ISBN 0-394-74104-8
- The Notebooks of Malte Laurids Brigge by Rainer Maria Rilke, Random House, 1983, ISBN 0-679-73245-4
- The Selected Poetry of Rainer Maria Rilke, Random House 1982, ISBN 0-394-52434-9, Vintage, 1989, ISBN 0-679-72201-7
- "Tao Te King", Lao Tseu, Synchronique Editions, 2008
- "Tao Te King, Un Voyage Illustré", Lao Tseu, Synchronique Editions, 2008
- "Tao Te King", édition Poche, Lao Tseu, Synchronique Editions, 2012
- "Gilgamesh, la quête de l'immortalité", traducteur français Aurélien Clause, Synchronique Editions, 2013

=== As editor ===
- Question Your Thinking, Change the World: Quotations from Byron Katie, Hay House, 2007, ISBN 1-4019-1730-5
- The Essence of Wisdom: Words from the Masters to Illuminate the Spiritual Path, Broadway Books, 1998, ISBN 0-7679-0305-6
- Bestiary: An Anthology of Poems about Animals, Frog, Ltd., 1996, ISBN 1-883319-48-X
- Into the Garden: A Wedding Anthology (with Robert Hass), HarperCollins, 1993, ISBN 0-06-016919-2
- The Enlightened Mind: An Anthology of Sacred Prose, 1991, ISBN 0-06-092320-2
- The Enlightened Heart: An Anthology of Sacred Poetry, HarperCollins, 1989, ISBN 0-06-092053-X
- Dropping Ashes on the Buddha: The Teaching of Zen Master Seung Sahn, Grove Press, 1976, ISBN 0-8021-3052-6

=== Children's books ===
- The Ugly Duckling, by Hans Christian Andersen (illustrated by Steve Johnson and Lou Fancher), Candlewick Press, 2007, ISBN 978-0-7636-2159-9
- Iron Hans: A Grimms’ Fairy Tale (illustrated by Matt Tavares), Candlewick Press, 2007, ISBN 0-7636-2160-9
- Genies, Meanies, and Magic Rings: Three Tales from the Arabian Nights (illustrated by Tom Pohrt), Walker & Co., 2007, ISBN 0-8027-9639-7
- The Tinderbox, by Hans Christian Andersen (illustrated by Bagram Ibatoulline), Candlewick Press, 2007, ISBN 0-7636-2078-5
- The Wishing Bone and Other Poems (illustrated by Tom Pohrt), Candlewick Press, 2003, ISBN 0-7636-1118-2
- The Nightingale, by Hans Christian Andersen (illustrated by Bagram Ibatoulline), Candlewick Press, 2002, ISBN 0-7636-1521-8
- Jesus: What He Really Said and Did, Harpertempest 2002, ISBN 0-06-449009-2
- The Creation (illustrated by Ori Sherman), Dial Books, 1990, ISBN 0-8037-0618-9
