= Joseph and the Way of Forgiveness =

Novel about the Biblical Joseph

- First edition
- Author: Stephen Mitchell
- Language: English
- Genre: Bible fiction
- Publisher: St. Martin's Press
- Publication date: 2019
- Publication place: United States
- Pages: 272
- ISBN: 1250237521

Joseph and the Way of Forgiveness: A Biblical Tale Retold is a 2019 novel by Stephen Mitchell, retelling the story of Joseph from the Book of Genesis. Written in the style of a midrash, the novel expands on the Genesis narrative as it follows Joseph from adolescence to maturity, focusing on his thoughts and deep belief in Yahweh.

== Plot ==
Joseph is a handsome and intelligent youth, much more so than his shepherd brothers. Joseph loves his brothers but feels that he is better than them. Their father, Jacob, loves Joseph the most because he is the son of Rachel, Jacob's greatest love. After Rachel died, Jacob kept Joseph close to remind him of his lost love.

Joseph's brothers know that Jacob preferred Joseph over them and they hated the dreams Joseph would tell. The brothers conspire to the enslavement and eventual imprisonment of Joseph in a pit. In the pit, Joseph ponders why his brothers would do something so brutal to him. After going through many emotions, Joseph sees himself from his brothers’ point of view and understands their motivation. After becoming a wise and important leader in Egypt, the brothers and Joseph meet once again and Joseph forgives them for all they've done.

In an epilogue, Joseph's spends his last day thinking upon his life and identity, coming to the end of his life with no regrets.

== Reception ==
The novel received positive reception and appreciation from Jewish and gentile readership. Sidra DeKoven Ezrahi from Tikkun gave the book a positive review, noting the Zen-like meditative moments integrated in the narrative, Mitchell's depiction of Joseph's transformation from a youth of folly to a mature powerful leader and the creative use of Hebrew amidst the English prose. Bob Bahr of the Atlanta Jewish Times commended Mitchell for "reanimat[ing] this ancient character" and found the message of forgiveness inspiring.
