= Byron Katie =

American speaker and author

Byron Kathleen Mitchell
- Born: Byron Kathleen Reid; December 6, 1942 (age 83); Breckenridge, Texas
- Other name: Byron Katie
- Occupations: Author, speaker, life coach
- Known for: "The Work (of Byron Katie)"
- Spouse: Stephen Mitchell
- Website: https://thework.com

Byron Kathleen Mitchell, (née Reid; born December 6, 1942) better known as Byron Katie, is an American speaker and author who teaches a method of self-inquiry known as "The Work of Byron Katie" or simply as "The Work". She is the founder of Byron Katie International, an organization that includes the School for the Work and Turnaround House in Ojai, California. Time Magazine describes her as "a spiritual innovator for the 21st century."

== Early life ==
Katie was born in Breckenridge, Texas, on December 6, 1942, and grew up in Barstow, California. Her father, Rodney Reid, was a train engineer and her mother, Marion Campbell, was a housewife. In 1963, she married Robert Robinson in San Bernardino at age 19, had three children and started a career in real estate.

== Career ==
In 1986, when she was 43 with three children and unhappily married to her second husband, she reportedly suffered from depression, agoraphobia, and overeating, and self-medicated with codeine and alcohol. She called her insurance company for help and was referred to Hope House, a women's counseling center in Los Angeles that has since closed. After two weeks of self-reflection at home, she reportedly experienced an epiphany in her thinking, which created a way for her to challenge and lessen the harmful effects of long-held beliefs. She credited the epiphany, which became known as "The Work," for her subsequent weight loss and reductions in bad habits. Family members, as well as one of the therapists at Hope House, said Katie underwent a personality change.

She began holding informal meetings to discuss her philosophy, and in the early 1990s, started holding formalized workshops. The workshops eventually led to the formation of Byron Katie International.

== Family ==
She is married to the writer and translator Stephen Mitchell. Katie is the mother of record producer Ross Robinson.

== Teachings ==
She describes her 1986 epiphany as follows:

I discovered that when I believed my thoughts, I suffered, but that when I didn't believe them, I didn't suffer, and that this is true for every human being. Freedom is as simple as that. I found that suffering is optional. I found a joy within me that has never disappeared, not for a single moment.

Katie calls her process of self-inquiry "The Work".

Katie's experience, as described in her book Loving What Is, is that individual suffering is caused by believing one's distressful thoughts. She says that believing one's distressful thoughts puts one into painful positions that lead to suffering, which she recognized to be the case with herself. Through self-inquiry, she describes how a different, less-known capacity of the mind can end this suffering. Katie's method of self-inquiry aims to free individuals from the suffering caused by their thoughts and beliefs. It encourages a level of self-awareness and liberation from patterns of thinking that contribute to one's suffering and unhappiness.

Her books comprehensively introduce her method, including detailed discussions of how each step is conducted and examples from real-life sessions. The self-inquiring Work method can also be applied to issues of love and relationships.

Specifically, The Work is a way of identifying and questioning any stressful thought. It consists of four questions and what is referred to as the "turnarounds". The four questions are:

1. Is it true?
2. Can you absolutely know that it's true?
3. How do you react, what happens, when you believe that thought?
4. Who would you be without the thought?

The next step in The Work is known as "the turnarounds," which involves considering the opposite of the thought being examined. For instance, the thought "My husband should listen to me" can be turned around to the following alternatives: "I should listen to my husband," "I should listen to myself," and "My husband shouldn't listen to me." Then, the individual finds specific examples of how each "turnaround" might be "just as true" as the original distressing thought.

== Bibliography ==
- Losing The Moon: Byron Katie Dialogues on Non-Duality, Truth and Other Illusions, edited by Ellen J. Mack, The Work Foundation Inc, 1998, ISBN 1-89024606-9
- Loving What Is: Four Questions That Can Change Your Life, with Stephen Mitchell, Harmony Books, 2002, ISBN 0-609-60874-6 (HC)
- I Need Your Love—Is That True? How to Stop Seeking Love, Appreciation, and Approval and Start Finding Them Instead, with Michael Katz, Harmony Books, 2005, ISBN 1-4000-5107-X (HC)
- A Thousand Names for Joy: Living in Harmony with the Way Things Are, with Stephen Mitchell, Harmony Books, 2007, ISBN 978-0-307-33923-2 (HC)
- Question Your Thinking, Change the World: Quotations from Byron Katie, edited by Stephen Mitchell, Hay House, 2007, ISBN 978-1-4019-1730-2 (PB)
- Who Would You Be Without Your Story?: Dialogues with Byron Katie, edited by Carol Williams, Hay House, 2008, ISBN 978-1-4019-2179-8 (PB)
- Tiger-Tiger, Is It True?, illustrated by Hans Wilhelm, Hay House, 2009, ISBN 978-1-4019-2560-4 (HC)
- Peace in the Present Moment, with Eckhart Tolle, Hampton Roads Pub Co Inc 2010, Newburyport, MA 2010, ISBN 978-1-57174-643-6
- The Four Questions: For Henny Penny and Anybody with Stressful Thoughts, by Byron Katie, Illustrated by Hans Wilhelm, TarcherPerigee 2016, ISBN 0399174249
- A Mind at Home with Itself: How Asking Four Questions Can Free Your Mind, Open Your Heart, and Turn Your World Around, with Stephen Mitchell, HarperOne 2017, ISBN 0062651609
