= Zaphnath-Paaneah =

Biblical name

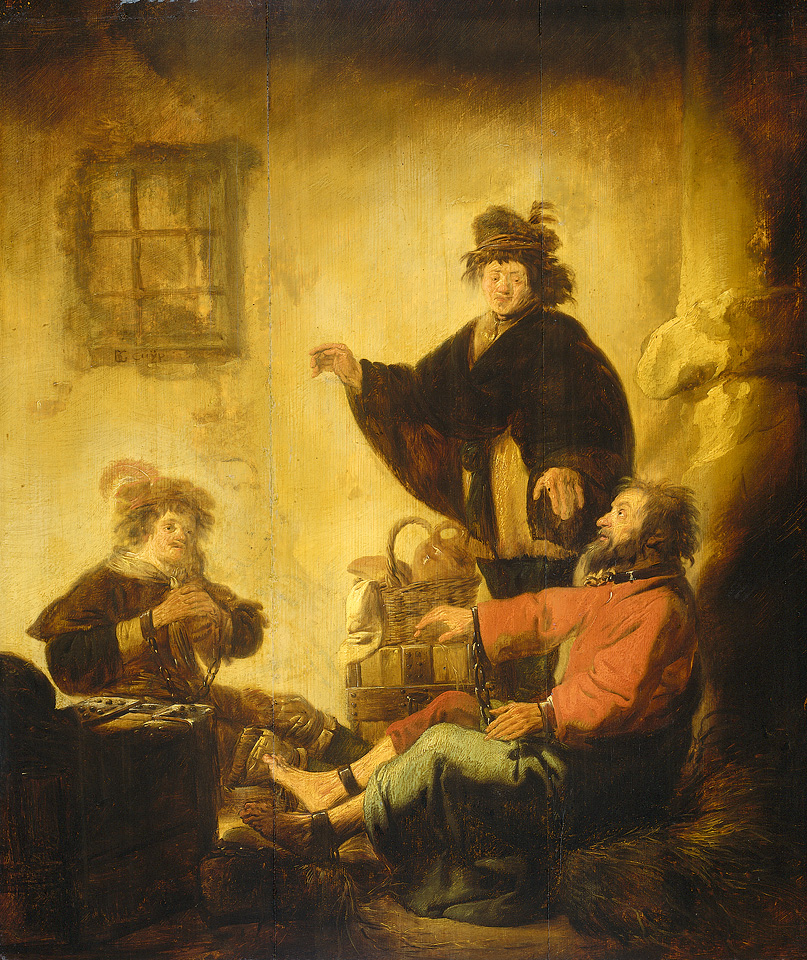
Joseph interpreting the dreams of the baker and the cupbearer, by Benjamin Cuyp, c. 1630

Zaphnath-Paaneah (Biblical Hebrew: צָפְנַת פַּעְנֵחַ Ṣāp̄naṯ Paʿnēaḥ, LXX: Ψονθομφανήχ Psonthomphanḗch) is the name given by Pharaoh to Joseph in the Genesis narrative (Genesis 41:45).

The name may be of Egyptian origins, but there is no straightforward etymology; some Egyptologists accept that the second element of the name may contain the word Ꜥnḫ "life".

== Interpretations ==
Targum Onkelos (1st century CE) gives the meaning of the name as "the man to whom hidden things are revealed"; Targum Pseudo-Jonathan, "the man who revealeth mysteries"; Josephus (c. CE 94), "a finder of mysteries". Rashi (11th–12th century CE) in his commentary on the Torah gives the meaning "explainer of hidden things". Nachmanides (13th century) gives "explainer of secrets", while Bahya ben Asher (13th–14th century) gives "the one who reveals secrets". The reason for these translations is that the feminine noun צָפְנַת (Ṣāp̄naṯ) refers to something hidden/secret in Hebrew, deriving from the root צפן (ṣ-p-n), meaning "to hide, conceal"; while פַּעְנֵחַ (Paʿnēaḥ) is a verb deriving from the root פענח (p-ʿ-n-ḥ), meaning "to discover, decipher, decode". This would give us the literal translation of "Zaphnath-Paaneah" from Hebrew as "He [who] deciphered the Hidden".

The Jewish interpretation is received in early Protestant translations: the Geneva Bible (1599) glosses "The expounder of secrets", while the Authorised Version of 1611 has in the margin: "Which in the Coptic signifies, 'A revealer of secrets', or 'The man to whom secrets are revealed.'"

In his work on Genesis, and in the Vulgate, Jerome gives as the Latin translation salvator mundi "saviour of the world". This Christian interpretation (reinforcing the ancient concept of Joseph as a type of Christ) is influenced by the Greek form of the name, Ψονθομφανήχ Psonthomphanḗkh and Ψομθομφανήχ Psomthomphanḗkh in the Septuagint and the Hexaplaric version, respectively. This, at least, is the suggestion made by Wilhelm Gesenius in his Hebrew-Chaldee Lexicon. Early Egyptologists have interpreted the name as equivalent to Coptic ⲡⲥⲟⲧⲙⲫⲉⲛⲉϩ psotmpheneh or ⲡⲥⲱⲧⲙ ⲫⲉⲛⲉϩ psōtm pheneh meaning "the salvation of the age".

D&d G40 G1 R8 A40 M17 Z7 I9 S34
*(ḏd pꜣ-nṯr jw.f ꜥnḫ)
"God speaks and he lives"
in hieroglyphs

Since the decipherment of hieroglyphics, Egyptologists have interpreted the final element of the name (-ʿnêaḫ, -anḗkh) as containing the Egyptian word ꜥnḫ "life"; notably, Georg Steindorff in 1889 offered a full reconstruction of ḏd pꜣ nṯr iw.f ꜥnḫ "the god speaks [and] he lives" (Middle Egyptian pronunciation: ṣa pīr nata yuVf (Note: V represents an unknown vowel sound.) anaḫ). Egyptologist Kenneth Kitchen, however, has pointed out this interpretation's shortcomings; namely, this name-type is unattested prior to the 11th century BCE while Joseph lived much earlier, and that this name type always mentioned a specific deity, never 'the god'.

D f G1 W G41 Y1 Z2 n N16 N23 Z1 p w anx n x A1
(*ḏfꜣw n tꜣ pw ꜥnḫ)
"the sustenance of the land is he, the living one"
in hieroglyphs

Kitchen's objections were already raised in 1929 by Abraham Yahuda, who also pointed out that this type of name makes sense only when it is given to a newborn, placing the baby under the god's protection; he suggested instead ḏfꜣ n tꜣ pꜣ ꜥnḫ "the living one is the sustenance of (the) land" or ḏfꜣ n tꜣ pw ꜥnḫ "the sustenance of the land is he, the living one."

G40 G1 z&A1&Z1 n t Z4 a M F10 A2 f n A x t Y1 Z2
(*pꜣ s nty ꜥm=f nꜣ iḫ.t)
"the man who knows the things"
in hieroglyphs

Jozef Vergote agreed with Yahuda's criticism of Steindorff's hypothesis but in turn considered the expression "living one" in Yahuda's suggestion to be "tellement entortillée qu'elle enlève toute vraisemblance à l'hypothèse." Instead, Vergote returns to the Septuagint version, explaining Ψονθομφανήχ as pꜣ s nty ꜥm=f nꜣ iḫ.t, "the man who knows the things," consistent with the traditional Jewish interpretation.

== Bibliography ==
- Marquardt, Philologus, vii. 676;
- Cheyne and Black, Encyc. Bibl. col. 5379 (where a disfigured Hebrew original is suspected);
- Steindorff, G., Der Name Josephs Saphenat-Pa'neach: Genesis Kapitel 41, 45. ZÄS 27, 1889, 41–42.
- Proc. Soc. Bibl. Arch. xx. 208 (where the other theories have been collected). E. G.
- "Zaphnath-Paaneah". JewishEncyclopedia.com.
