= Bakkah =

Place mentioned in the Quran and possibly in the Tanakh

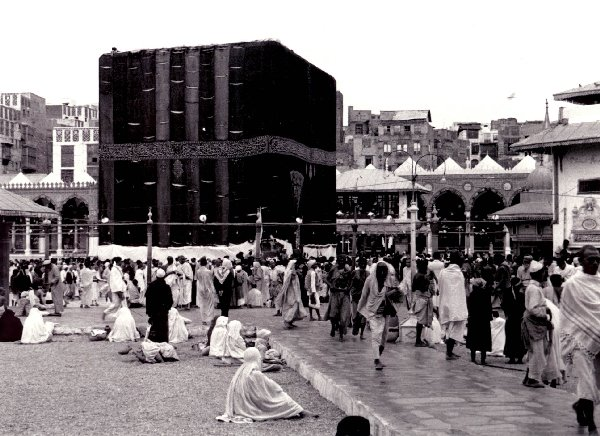
The Kaaba in Mecca or Makkah.

Bakkah (Arabic: بَكَّة [ˈbak.kah]), is a place mentioned in surah 3 ('Āl 'Imrān), ayah 96 of the Qur'an, a verse sometimes translated as: "Indeed, the first House [of worship] established for mankind was that at Bakkah [i.e., Makkah] - blessed and a guidance for the worlds." (Quran 3:96)

According to Muslim scholars Bakkah is an ancient name for Mecca, the most holy city of Islam. (The word Mecca is only used once in the Quran in verse 48:24 ("And it is He who withheld their hands from you and your hands from them within [the area of] Makkah after He caused you to overcome them. And ever is Allāh, of what you do, Seeing."))

Most Muslims believe Mecca and Bakkah are synonyms, but to Muslim scholars there is a distinction: Bakkah refers to the Kaaba and the sacred site immediately surrounding it, while Mecca is the name of the city in which they are both located.

According to Lisān al-'Arab of Ibn Manẓūr, the site of the Kaaba and its surroundings was named Bakkah due to crowding and congestion of people in the area. The Arabic verb bakka (بَكَّ), with double "k", means to crowd like in a bazaar. This is not to be confused with another unrelated Arabic verb bakā (بَكَىٰ) (single k) which is the past tense of yabkī (يَبْكِي), to cry.

== Islamic tradition ==
Islamic tradition identifies Bakkah as the ancient name for the site of Mecca. An Arabic word, its etymology, like that of Mecca, is obscure.

One meaning ascribed to it is "narrow", seen as descriptive of the area in which the valley of the holy places and the city of Mecca are located, pressed in upon as they are by mountains. Widely believed to be a synonym for Mecca, it is said to be more specifically the early name for the valley located therein, while Muslim scholars generally use it to refer to the sacred area of the city that immediately surrounds and includes the Kaaba.

The form Bakkah is used for the name Mecca in the Quran in 3:96, while the form Mecca is used in 48:24. In South Arabic, the language in use in the southern portion of the Arabian Peninsula at the time of Muhammad, the b and m were interchangeable. The Quranic passage using the form Bakkah says: "Surely the first House ˹of worship˺ established for humanity is the one at Bakkah—a blessed sanctuary and a guide for ˹all˺ people." Other references to Mecca in the Quran (6:42, 42:7) call it Umm al-Qura, meaning "mother of all settlements".

In Islamic tradition, Bakkah is where Hagar (Hājar) and Ishmael (Ismā'īl) settled after being taken by Abraham (Ibrāhīm) to the wilderness, a story comparable to the Book of Genesis (21:14-21). Genesis tells that Abraham gave Hagar food and a skin of water, but that Hagar and Ishmael ran out of water to drink in the outskirts (Note: The Hebrew word (מִדבָּר, midbar), can also be translated as wilderness, desert, or plains.) of Beersheba. In Arab tradition, Hagar runs back and forth between Safa and Marwa—two elevated points—seven times to search for help before sitting down in despair, at which point an angel appeared and hit the ground with his heel (or his wing) and caused a miraculous well to spring out of the ground.
However, the account in Genesis focuses more about the outcasting of Hagar, the mother of Ishmael and an Egyptian slave to Sarah (Abraham's wife and half sister in Genesis), from Abraham (who remains in Beersheba) due to Ismael provoking Sarah on the day of Isaac's weaning, and she travels alone with Ismael, who she later gets an Egyptian wife for during their stay at the Desert of Paran. Unlike Arab tradition, Genesis accounts that Hagar set a dying Ismael underneath a bush and then sat down a bowshot distance's away as to not watch him die, and when he (Note: The Septuagint use she.) began to cry, God called from Heaven to Hagar to take Ismael and continue traveling, where then he opened her eyes, revealing a well.

The Islamic tradition holds that a spring gushed forth from the spot where Hagar had laid Ishmael, and this spring came to be known as the Well of Zamzam. When Muslims on hajj run between the hills of Safa and Marwah seven times, it is to commemorate Hagar's search for help and the resulting revelation of the well of Zamzam.

In addition to the Islamic tradition that Hagar and Ishmael settled in Bakkah, the Quran relates that Abraham came to Mecca to help his son Ishmael build the Kaaba adjacent to the well of Zamzam.

Ibn Ishaq, the 8th-century Arab Muslim historian, relates that during the renovation of Kaaba undertaken by the Quraysh before Islam, found an inscription in one of the corners of the foundation of the building that mentions Bakkah. Composed in Syriac, it was incomprehensible to the Quraysh until a Jew translated it for them as follows: "I am Allah, the Lord of Bakka. I created it on the day I created heaven and earth and formed the sun and the moon, and I surrounded it with seven pious angels. It will stand while its two mountains stand, a blessing to its people with milk and water."

The name Bakkah is woven into the kiswa, the cloth covering the Kaaba that is replaced each year before the Hajj.

== Valley of the Bakkah ==
The Valley of the Bakkah (Hebrew: עֵמֶק הַבָּכָא Emeq haBakha, Hebrew pronunciation: [ʔemek habaχa]), or the Valley of Bakha, also transliterated as Baka or Baca, is mentioned in Psalms 84, in the following passage:

Blessed is the man whose strength is in thee; in whose heart are the ways of them. those Who passing through the valley of the Bakha, they make it a spring; Also blessing the first rain will give. They go from strength to strength, every one of them in Zion appeareth before God.

The composition of the psalm is credited to the Sons of Korah, a Levite clan which regularly performed musical compositions for David and in the First Temple.

The same Hebrew word בכא (bakha) is associated with a battle accounted in 2 Samuel 5:23–24 and in 1 Chronicles 14:13–16 which took place on the Valley of Rephaim, about 4–7 kilometers southwest of the present-day Old City of Jerusalem. In the accounts, David is advised to engage the Philistines in battle when he hears the sound of marching in the tops of the bakha trees. (Note: Bekha'im, the plural form of bakha, is translated as mulberry trees in the King James Version and as pear trees in Middle English translations, although the specific tree to which bakha may refer to is not known. Many modern translations suggest balsam or poplar trees.)

Muslims see the mention of a pilgrimage to the Valley of Bakkah in the passage as a reference to Mecca, similar to the Quran in 3:96. Some also draw connections of the passage "they make it a place of springs" to the Book of Genesis' account of how Hagar the Egyptian has a well revealed to by God in the outskirts of Beersheba, presumably on the way to Bakkah.

In Judaism and in Christianity, there are other interpretations of the psalm.
One Jewish interpretation is based on how the psalm is composed by Levites, a tribe of Israel which are not given inherited land amongst the other tribes, but rather travel—particularly as shepherds—between the lands of the other tribes ("They go from strength to strength") and have priesthood responsibilities as their inheritance ("every one of them in Zion appeareth before God"), and as they travel, they bring pasture to desolated lands, such as a valley of bakha trees which served as a battlefield between Israel and Philistia. In this interpretation, the psalm gives glory to the Tribe of Levi and praises their inheritance of priesthood ("whose strength is in thee") over an inheritance of land.

Another Jewish interpretation states that the psalm is a celebration of pilgrimage to the Temple (at this time, the First Temple), and that the psalmist desires to be in the Temple—the Presence of God—and details steps of the way to Jerusalem, where it is located. On the way, the pilgrims may pass through the Valley of Bakha, which could be synonymous with the Valley of Rephaim, as it is a valley where bakha trees grow according to 2 Samuel 5:22–24. Here, the phrase "also blessing the first rain will give" refers to the beginning of winter in the region of Israel—the first rains—suggesting that the pilgrimage is for the festival of Sukkot, when prayers of rain are offered. If this is the case, the psalm may be based on Psalms 122, which is also traditionally a psalm about a pilgrimage to Jerusalem for Sukkot, which is credited to David.

Another interpretation, which is used by Jews and Christians, links the psalm as a successor to Psalms 42–43, which are also credited to the Sons of Korah. In the earlier psalms, they are seen as lamentations from being away from Zion and in the presence of enemies, who give taunts about the psalmist being away from Zion and being rejected by God, and cries about the weakness of the soul deficient in faith are given. Linking with Psalms 84, the same psalmist would praise the presence of God which is at Zion, and yearns to be there as well. As the psalmist is away, he writes about the pilgrimage back to Jerusalem, where dry and desolate places like the Valley of Bakha may be encountered, but it will be enlightened by the pilgrims, and treated it as if they were places of springs; finding refuge through hardship—the rains are the responses by God through faith during the troubling times. After the pilgrimage, the pilgrims are congregated in the presence of God, where prayers are offered.

Still, many Jews and Christians utilize the alternative translation of bakha into tears, which has been practiced since Greek translations and continued throughout Latin and English translations. In this—unlike בכה (bakhah), which is translated to cry—בכא (bakha) would translate to tears, as a Biblical Hebrew counterpart to the common Modern Hebrew word for tears, דמעות (dema'oth). This still exists with modern translations which strongly reference the Masoretic Text of the psalm, including ones outside of English. The name עמק הבכא (Emek haBakha) is also used for the loosely-related Valley of Tears, located in the Golan Heights which received its name during the Yom Kippur War.

The word Bakha (Biblical Hebrew: *𐤁𐤊𐤀 [bɔxɔ]) is pronounced in terminal stress, unlike Bakkah, which is penultimately stressed. Both Bakha and Bakkah are of Semitic origin, which have derived from the same place but changed the letter forms. (K - KH, example: I-s-ma'il, I-sh-mael)

A literal translation is "Valley of the Bakha", although the translations into Biblical Greek assumed it to be the similar-sounding word בכה ("bakhah"), "crying", and translates it as ἐν τῇ κοιλάδι τοῦ κλαυθμῶνος ("Valley of Mourning", "Valley of Weeping").

== Revisionist views ==
Tom Holland and Patricia Crone, both revisionist scholars of early Islamic history, postulate that Mecca and Bakkah might not be different spelling variations of the same area, a view commonly held by historical and modern Islamic authors, but rather Bakkah existed in another place.

Holland, in his 2012 book In the Shadow of the Sword, states that Bakkah must have been located somewhere near Byzantine Empire's southern frontier, citing Mecca before Islam being absent in Byzantine records of Hejaz, Quran mentioning Byzantine military expeditions and Quranic imagery (such as Mušrikūn having cattle and gardens of vines, olives, and pomegranates) being vastly different from desert regions of Mecca and being more in line with wetter Syria-Levant region.

Although he asserts that it's not possible to ascertain where Bakkah had exactly stood during the early Islamic history, he later postulates the region of Mamre as a possible location, currently located in the West Bank. He identifies Mamre as an ancient Arabic pilgrimage site, citing a mid-7th century account by a Nestorian chronicler that parallels the Quranic description. He also proposes “Maqam Ibrahim,” two words mentioned in the Quran along with Bakkah, which can be translated as "the place where Abraham stood," not being a stone as it has been identified in the Islamic tradition, but rather he interprets the sentence hinting at the possible Levantine location of Bakkah.

== See also ==
- Mecca
