= Jurhum =

Arab tribe

Jurhum (Arabic: جرهم, romanized: Jurhum; also Banu Jurhum or The Children of Jurhum) historically referred to as the Goramenoi (Ancient Greek: Γοραμῆνοι) in the 5th century, was a tribe of Arabia associated with Mecca. Muslim texts state that they were succeeded by Qusayy ibn Kilab, the leader of the Quraysh.

They were considered Qahtanites traditionally, whose historical abode was said to be Yemen. Irfan Shahîd wrote that M. al-Iryani printed a Sabaic inscription in 1974 identifying it as a South Arabian tribe; previous theories had suggested they instead were the eponymous residents of Gerrha in Eastern Arabia, which this inscription put to rest.

== Kaaba ==
According to Muslim accounts, the tribe of the Jurhum gave protection to the important figures of Hagar and her son Ishmael in Islam, a relationship cemented with Ishmael's marriage to a Jurhumite woman, Rala bint Mudad ibn 'Amr ibn Jurhum ibn Himyar ibn Qahtan. The Jurhum are said to have been involved in worship centred on the Kaaba, the holy sanctuary rebuilt by Ishmael and his father Abraham and revered as a pilgrimage site. According to one tradition, their custodianship over the Kaaba ended after they were ousted by the Banu Khuza'a, a tribal group from the south.

== Well of Zamzam ==
Muslim tradition further holds that Hagar and Ishmael found a spring in Mecca now called the Zamzam Well from which the Jurhum wanted to drink, and that after their ousting by the Banu Khuza'a, the Jurhum collected the treasures dedicated to the Kaaba and destroyed the Zamzam so that nobody would find it.

== See also ==
- Tribes of Arabia
- Ishmaelites

== Bibliography ==
- Shahîd, Irfan (1989). Byzantium and the Arabs in the fifth century (Illustrated, reprint ed.). Dumbarton Oaks. ISBN 9780884021520.
- Shahid, Irfan (1989). Byzantium and the Arabs in the Fifth Century. Dumbarton Oaks. p. 337.
