= Masjid al-Haram =

Holiest mosque in Mecca, Saudi Arabia

The Sacred Mosque of Mecca
- al-Masjid al-Ḥarām المسجد الحرام
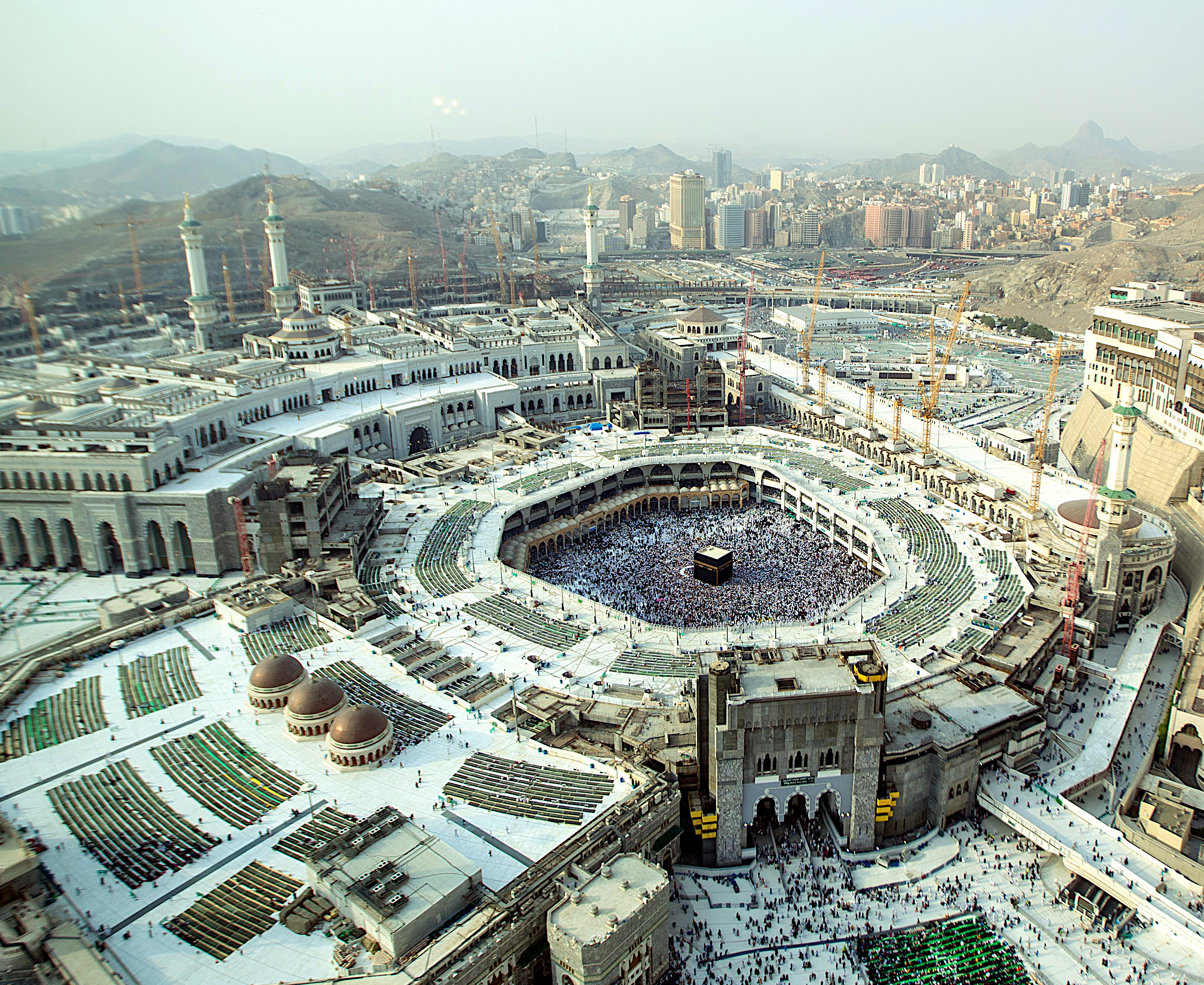

- Location in Saudi Arabia Masjid al-Haram (Middle East)

Religion
- Affiliation: Islam
- Leadership: Abd ar-Raḥman as-Sudais (as President of the Affairs of the Two Holy Mosques and Chief Imam)

Location
- Location: Mecca City, Mecca Province, Saudi Arabia
- Administration: General Presidency of Haramain
- Coordinates: 21°25′21″N 39°49′34″E

Architecture
- Type: Mosque
- Established: 638 AD

Specifications
- Capacity: 3.0 million
- Minaret: 13
- Minaret height: 139 m (456 ft)
- Site area: 356,000 square metres (88 acres)

Website
- Official website

Masjid al-Haram (Arabic: المسجد الحرام, romanized: al-Masjid al-Ḥarām, lit. 'The Sacred Mosque'), also known as the Great Mosque of Mecca, is a mosque in Mecca, Saudi Arabia, serving as the holiest and most important mosque in Islam. As of 2026, the Great Mosque is the largest mosque in the world.

The Great Mosque is considered, alongside the Quba Mosque in Medina, among the earliest mosques in Islam. According to Islamic scholars, Abraham is seen as having built the Kaaba in Mecca, and consequently its sanctuary, which according to the Muslim view is seen as the first mosque that ever existed.

It has undergone major renovations and expansions through the years. It has passed through the control of various caliphs, sultans and kings, and is now under the control of the King of Saudi Arabia who also took on the title Custodian of the Two Holy Mosques.

It encloses the vicinity of the Kaaba in Mecca, in the western region of the country. It is among the pilgrimage sites associated with the Hajj, which every Muslim according to orthodox Islamic belief, must perform at least once in their lives if able. It is also the main site for the performance of ʿUmrah, the lesser pilgrimage that can be undertaken any time of the year. The rites of both pilgrimages include circumambulating the Kaaba within the mosque. The Great Mosque contains other important sites, such as the Black Stone, the Zamzam Well, Maqam Ibrahim, and the hills of Safa and Marwa.

== History ==
In the pre-Islamic religions of Arabia -spanning from the Levant to Yemen, numerous deities —such as, Al-Lat, Dhu al-Khalasa, and al-Uzza (also occasionally referred to as Chaabou), Dushara, Dhu Samawi etc.— were represented by aniconic cubic stone carvings or by cubic structures regarded as the abodes of these deities; furthermore, the existence of "sacred/haram zones" surrounding these sanctuaries and the widespread use of the name "Ka'b" to denote such sanctity, is well-established. Although the cultural heritage of the pagan era was largely eradicated during Islam's struggle to establish Islamic monotheism, historical research has uncovered traces of some sanctuaries that were significant enough to rival the Kaaba in Mecca; nevertheless, the belief that there has always been only one Kaaba has become deeply ingrained in Muslim literary and religious tradition. Today, the Kaaba and the Masjid al-Haram in Mecca are identified as the direction of prayer; however, an archaeological document found in the Taif region suggests that this view is anachronistic from the perspective of traditional Islamic historiography, as a stone inscription discovered there dates the construction of the Masjid al-Haram to the year 78 AH. Furthermore, a Quranic verse recounting Muhammad's night journey —an event often presented today as a miracle— to the Masjid al-Aqsa offers clues suggesting that the Masjid al-Haram mentioned in the Quran might differ from the one located in Mecca. Surah Al-Isra 17:1:

Glory be to the One Who took His servant by night from Masjid al-Haram to the Masjid al-Aqsa whose surroundings We have blessed, so that We may show him some of Our signs. Indeed, He alone is the All-Hearing, All-Seeing

The significance of mosque structures from the early Islamic period that face in different directions continues to be a subject of serious debate between revisionist historians and conservatives.

=== Era of Abraham and Ismael ===
According to Islamic tradition in the Quran, Abraham, together with his son Ismael, raised the foundations of a house, which has been identified by commentators as the Kaaba. According to Islamic tradition, it is said that Allah showed Abraham the exact site, which was previously built by Adam, very near to what is now the Well of Zamzam. After Abraham had built the Kaaba, an angel is said to have brought him the Black Stone, a celestial stone that, according to tradition, had fallen from Heaven on the nearby hill Abu Qubays. The Black Stone is believed by Islamic scholars to be the only remnant of the original structure made by Abraham.

After placing the Black Stone in the Eastern corner of the Kaaba, Abraham reportedly received a revelation in which God told the aged prophet that he should now go and proclaim the pilgrimage to mankind, so that men may come both from Arabia and from lands far away, on camel and on foot.

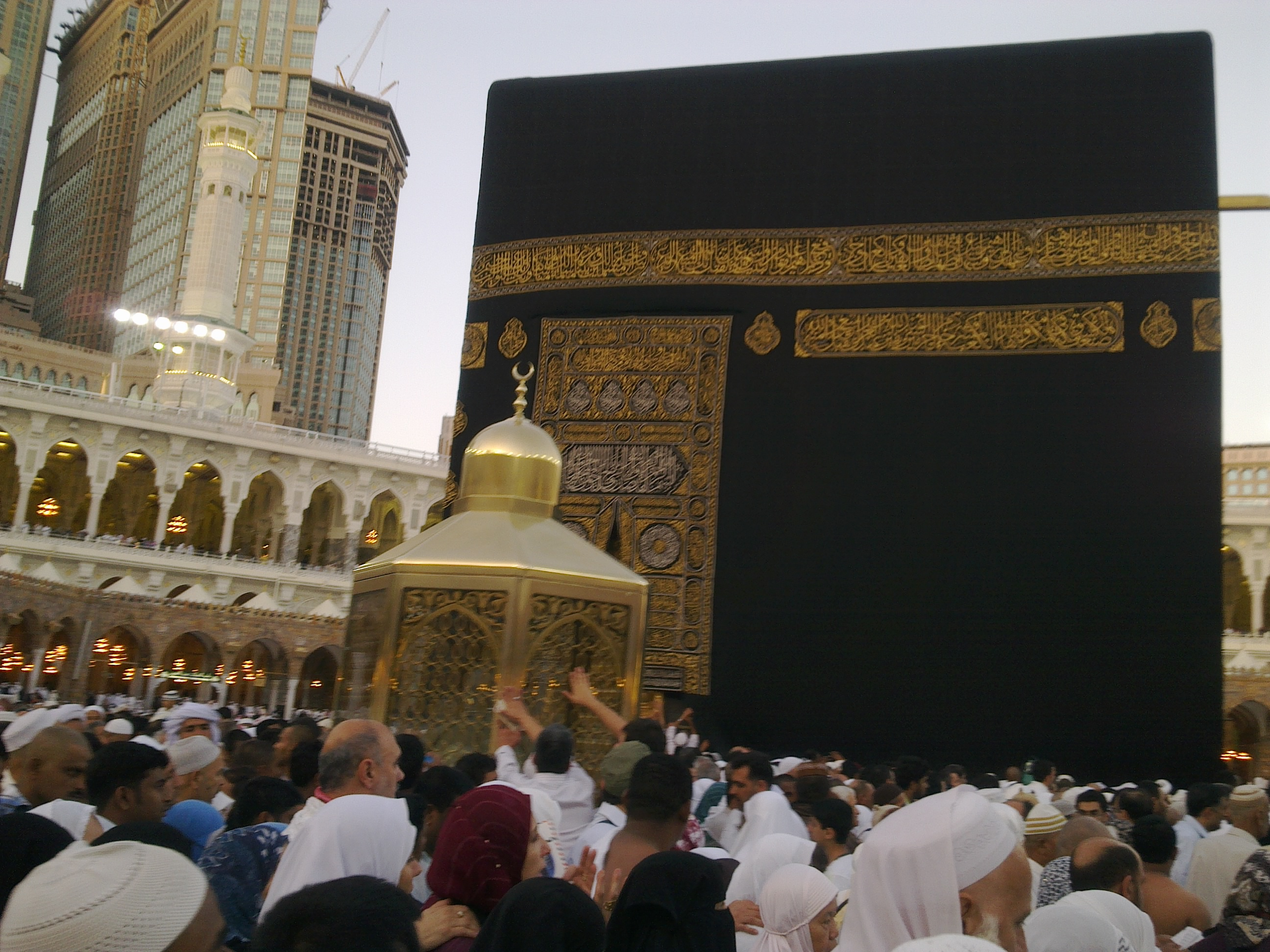
Muslim pilgrims surrounding the Maqam (Station) of Ibrahim (Abraham) near the Kaaba in 2008

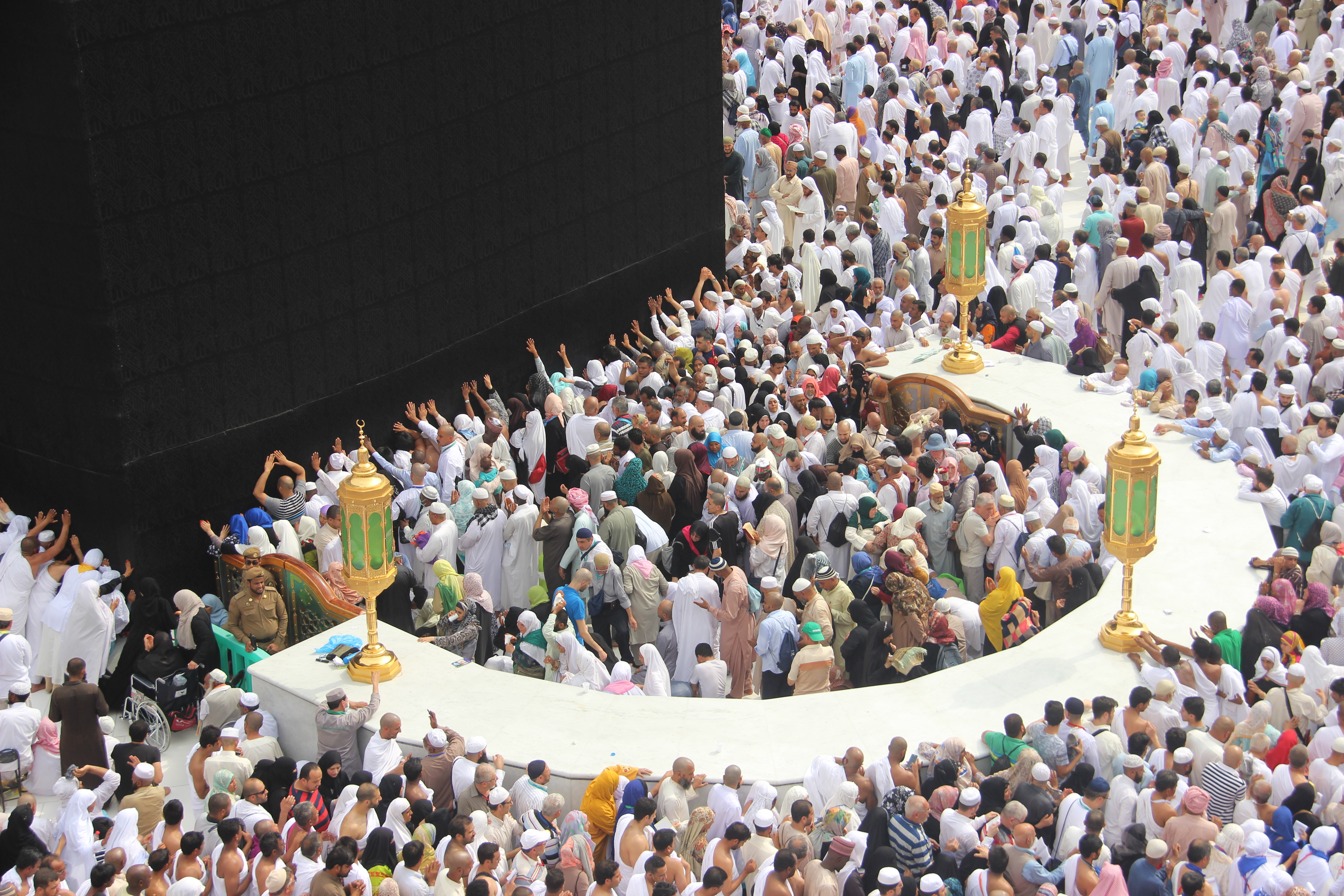
The Hateem where Isma'il (Ishmael) and Hajar (Hagar) dwelt

=== Era of Muhammad ===
Upon Muhammad's victorious return to Mecca in 630 CE, he and a number of the Sahaba including Ali broke the idols in and around the Kaaba, similar to what, according to the Quran, Abraham did in his homeland. This ended polytheistic use of the Kaaba, and began monotheistic rule over it and its sanctuary.

=== Rashidun era ===
The mosque has been expanded by caliph Umar in 637 CE by 1,500 m^{2}, in response to the increasing number of Muslims, its area has reached a total of 3,600 m^{2}, another expansion was carried out by caliph Uthman where the covered porticoes have been introduced for the first time.

=== Umayyad era ===
In 682, the ruler of Mecca Abd Allah ibn al-Zubayr, who opposed the Umayyads following the death of Mu'awiya I carried an expansion that increased the total area to 7,465 m^{2}, and following the reconquest of Mecca by the Umayyads in 692, the first major renovation to the mosque took place on the orders of Abd al-Malik ibn Marwan. Before this renovation, which included the mosque's outer walls being raised, the mosque was a small open area with the Kaaba at the center. By the end of the 8th century, the mosque's old wooden columns had been replaced with marble columns and the wings of the prayer hall had been extended on both sides along with the addition of a minaret on the orders of Al-Walid I.

=== Abbasid era ===
The next expansion of the mosque was sponsored by the Abbasid caliph al-Mansur between 754 and 757. This was followed by a major expansion begun by his successor, Caliph al-Mahdi, in 779. This work was completed shortly after him by his successor, Caliph al-Hadi (r. 785–786), which made the mosque's total area reach 28,000 m^{2}. This was the largest expansion to the size of the mosque thus far. Two further extensions were completed by caliph al-Mu'tadid in 894–5 and by caliph al-Muqtadir in 918, but it retained its overall form from this period on until the later Ottoman renovations.

=== Mamluk era ===
Significant structural repairs, expansions, and aesthetic enhancements were commissioned under successive Mamluk sultans, particularly in response to severe fires and flood damage. A devastating fire in 802 AH (1400 CE) severely damaged the mosque's colonnades and wooden roofs.

Under Sultan Barquq and his son Sultan al-Nasir Faraj, extensive reconstruction work was initiated to rebuild the burned arcades, replace stone columns, and restore the ornate wooden ceilings around the Kaaba courtyard. Sultan al-Nasir Faraj also undertook major structural repairs to the Holy Kaaba itself in 813 AH (1410 CE) after further damage, reinforcing its masonry and renewing its external cladding and interior elements. The roof was patched with local wood from the Ta’if Mountains and the damaged marble columns were replaced with stone columns quarried from the nearby mountains of the Hijaz.

Sultan Qaytbay, who reigned from 872 to 901 AH (1468 to 1496 CE), was one of the most prolific patrons of the Hejaz. He financed comprehensive repairs to the Masjid al-Haram's arcades, domes, and minarets following seasonal flooding and structural wear, sending specialized craftsmen and builders directly from Cairo to oversee the work.

During the late 9th to early 10th century AH (approx. late 15th and early 16th centuries), Mamluk rulers repaired and redesigned several minarets around the courtyard perimeter, incorporating distinctive Cairene-Mamluk decorative styles characterized by multiple balconies, intricate stonework, and patterned finials.

=== Ottoman era ===
In 1570, Sultan Selim II commissioned the chief architect Mimar Sinan to renovate the mosque. This renovation resulted in the replacement of the flat roof with domes decorated with calligraphy internally, and the placement of new support columns which are acknowledged as the earliest architectural features of the present mosque. These features are the oldest surviving parts of the building.

During heavy rains and flash floods in 1621 and 1629, the walls of the Kaaba and the mosque suffered extensive damage. In 1629, during the reign of Sultan Murad IV, the mosque was renovated. In the renovation of the mosque, a new stone arcade was added, three more minarets (bringing the total to seven) were built, and the marble flooring was retiled. This was the unaltered state of the mosque for nearly three centuries, the Ottoman era renovations did not expand the size of the mosque.

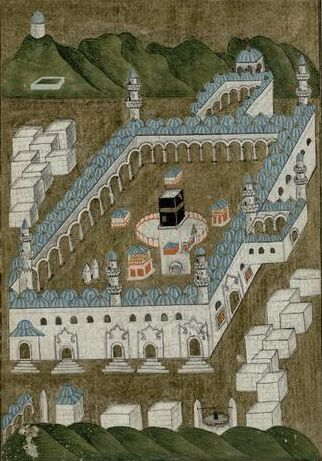
The Great Mosque in an illustration of the Dala'il al-Khayrat of Mustafa Halim, 1750

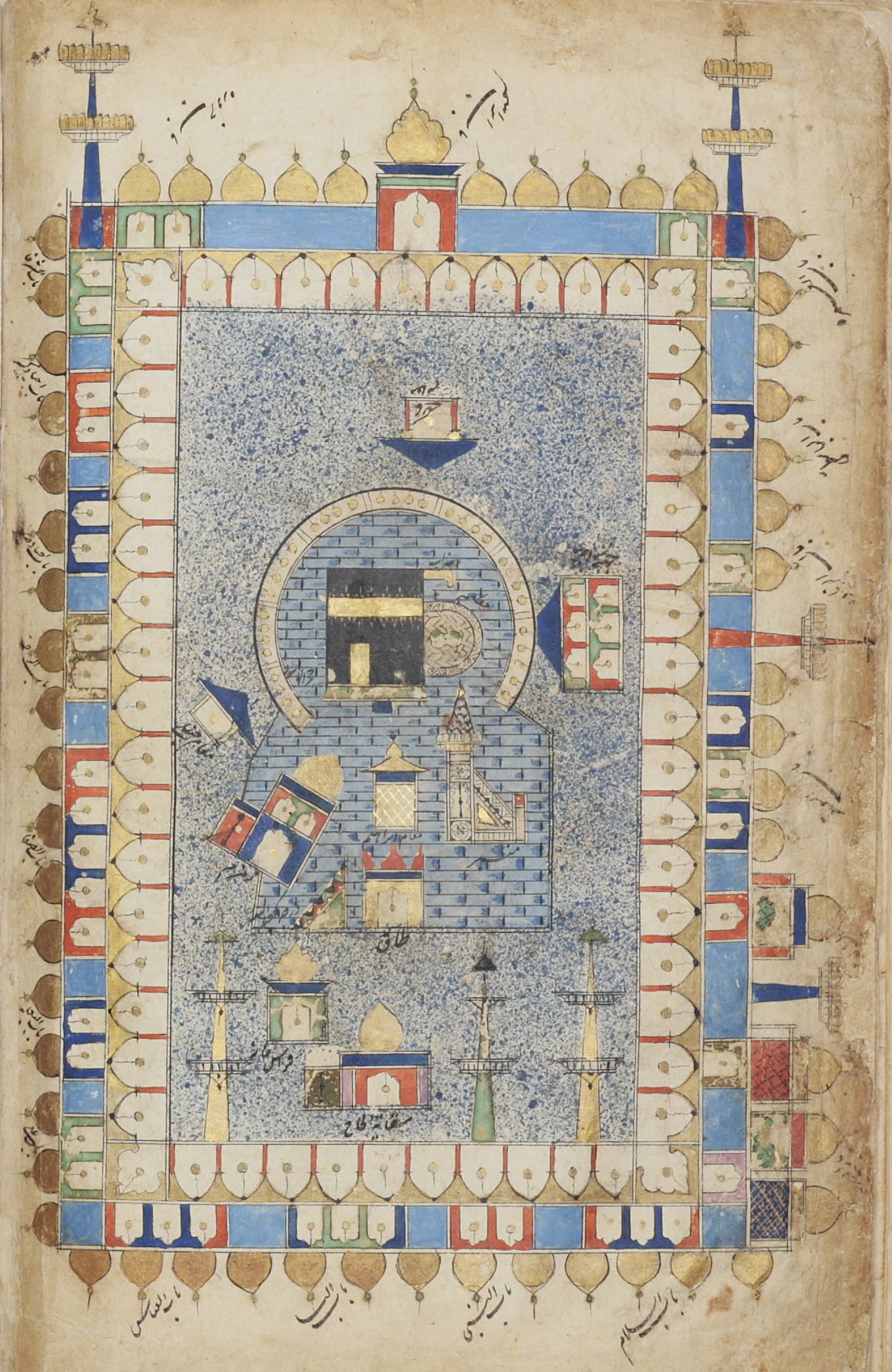
The Great Mosque in an illustration of the Futuh al-Haramayn of Muhi Al-Din Lari, 1582

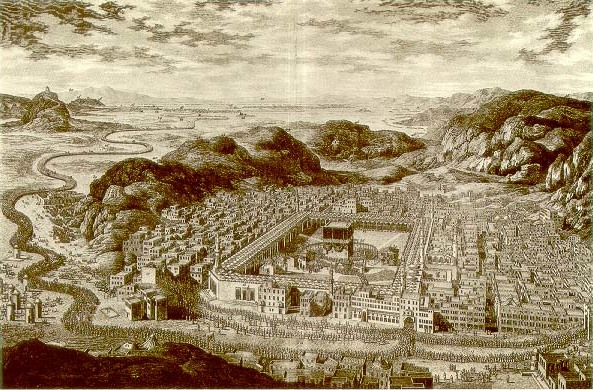
The mosque in 1850, during the Ottoman period

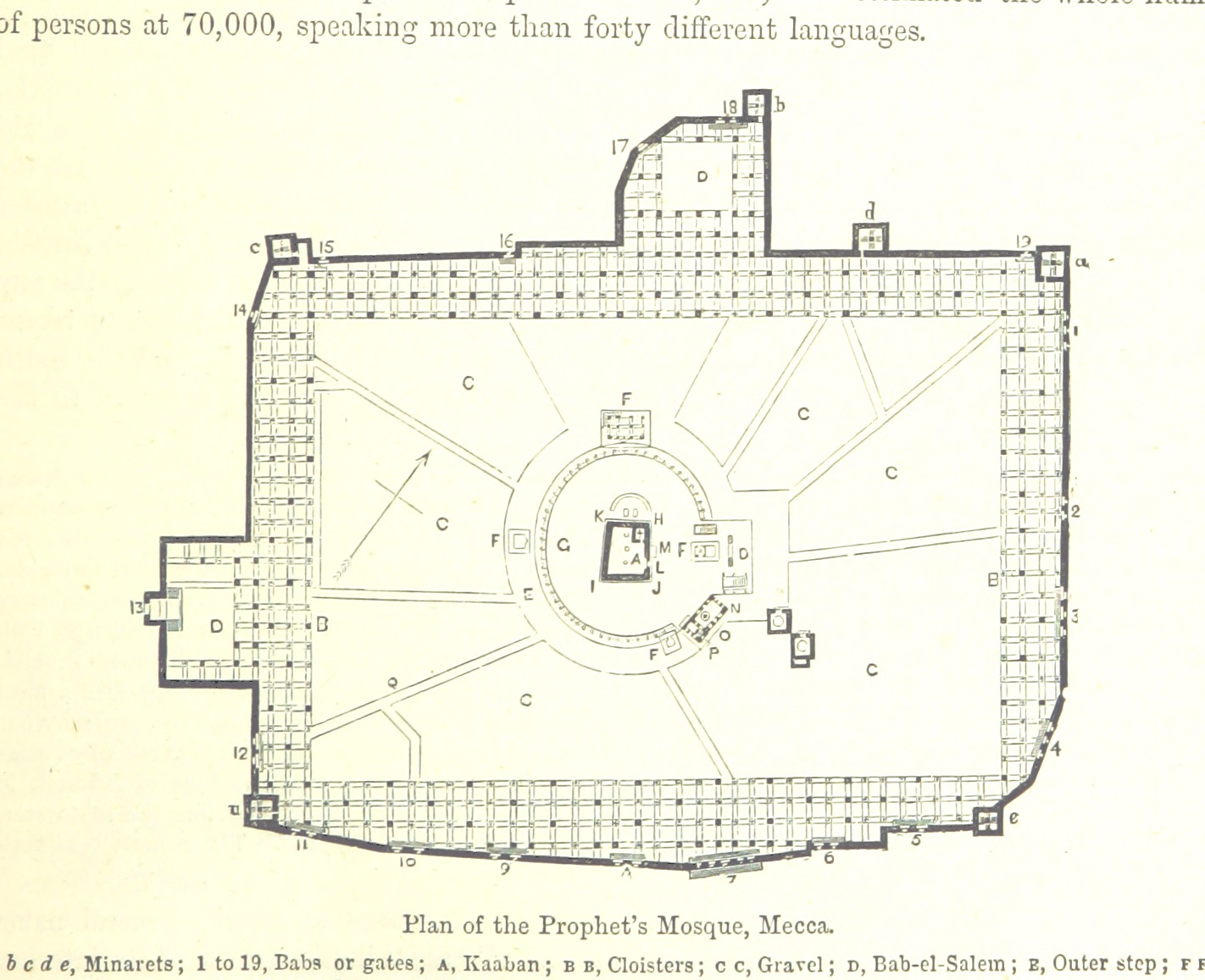
Plan of the Masjid al-Haram, 1884

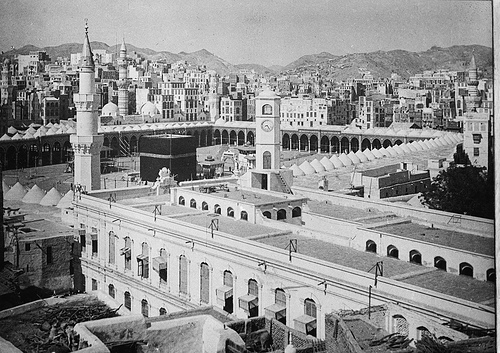
The mosque in 1910, during the Ottoman period

=== Saudi era ===
==== First Saudi expansion ====
The first major renovation under the Saudi kings was done between 1955 and 1976. In this renovation, four more minarets were added, the ceiling was refurnished, and the floor was replaced with artificial stone and marble. The Mas'a gallery (As-Safa and Al-Marwah) is included in the Mosque, via roofing and enclosures. During this renovation many of the historical features built by the Ottomans, particularly the support columns, were demolished.

On 20 November 1979, the Great Mosque was seized by extremist insurgents who called for the overthrow of the Saudi dynasty. They took hostages and in the ensuing siege hundreds were killed. These events came as a shock to the Islamic world, as violence is strictly forbidden within the mosque.

==== Second Saudi expansion ====
The second Saudi renovations under King Fahd, added a new wing and an outdoor prayer area to the mosque. The new wing, which is also for prayers, is reached through the King Fahd Gate. This extension was performed between 1986 and 1994.

1987 to 2005 saw the building of more minarets, the erecting of a King's residence overlooking the mosque and more prayer area in and around the mosque itself. These developments took place simultaneously with those in Arafat, Mina and Muzdalifah. This extension also added 18 more gates, three domes corresponding in position to each gate and the installation of nearly 500 marble columns. Other modern developments added heated floors, air conditioning, escalators and a drainage system.

In addition, the King Fahd expansion includes 6 dedicated prayer halls for people with disabilities. These halls have ramps to facilitate entry and exit with wheelchairs, as well as dedicated paths and free electric and manual carts for their use.

==== Third Saudi expansion ====
Interior of the Third Expansion.

In 2008, the Saudi government under King Abdullah Ibn Abdulaziz announced an expansion of the mosque, involving the expropriation of land to the north and northwest of the mosque covering 300,000 m^{2} (3,200,000 sq ft). At that time, the mosque covered an area of 356,800 m^{2} (3,841,000 sq ft) including indoor and outdoor praying spaces. 40 billion riyals (US$10.6 billion) was allocated for the expansion project. In August 2011, the government under King Abdullah announced further details of the expansion. It would cover an area of 400,000 m^{2} (4,300,000 ft^{2}) and accommodate 1.2 million worshippers, including a multi-level extension on the north side of the complex, new stairways and tunnels, a gate named after King Abdullah, and two minarets, bringing the total number of minarets to eleven. The circumambulation areas (Mataf) around the Kaaba would be expanded and all closed spaces receive air conditioning. After completion, it would raise the mosque's capacity from 770,000 to over 2.5 million worshippers. His successor, King Salman launched five megaprojects as part of the overall King Abdullah Expansion Project in July 2015, covering an area of 456,000 m^{2} (4,910,000 sq ft). The project was carried out by the Saudi Binladin Group. In 2012, the Abraj Al Bait complex was completed along with the 601-meter-tall (1,972 ft) Makkah Royal Clock Tower. An Austrian company was hired to complete a 100 million euro order of 4700 chandeliers and light fixtures in 26 sizes in 2013. The chandeliers and light fixtures were installed in the Shamiya Extension of the mosque. Some of the biggest gilded chandeliers were priced at 1 million euros each. The company has since been the provider of additional light fixtures to the mosque and other buildings in Mecca. In 2025, the lighting for the Mataf extension was completed by the same Austrian company. The project involved the delivery of 10 different lighting types and a total of around 550 custom-made chandeliers and luminaires, all produced from high-grade stainless steel and gilded with more than 200 kg of 24-karat gold. The project value is approximately €90 million. Part of the new lights was the 7-metre Al Fath Gate Chandelier, an octagonal, gold-plated chandelier with a 7-meter diameter and 360,000 lumens of output. All fixtures incorporate high-efficiency LED systems.

Arches in the third expansion

On 11 September 2015, at least 111 people died and 394 were injured when a crane collapsed onto the mosque. Construction work was suspended after the incident, and remained on hold due to financial issues during the 2010s oil glut. Development was eventually restarted two years later in September 2017.

==== COVID-19 Pandemic ====
On 5 March 2020, during the COVID-19 pandemic, the mosque began to be closed at night and the Umrah pilgrimage was suspended to limit attendance. The resumption of Umrah service began on 4 October 2020 with the first phase of a gradual resumption that was limited to Saudi citizens and expatriates from within the Kingdom at a rate of 30 percent. Only 10,000 people were given Hajj visas in 2020 while 60,000 people were given visas in 2021.

== Pilgrimage ==
The Great Mosque is the main setting for the Hajj and Umrah pilgrimages that occur in the month of Dhu al-Hijja in the Islamic calendar and at any time of the year, respectively. The Hajj pilgrimage is one of the Pillars of Islam, required of all able-bodied Muslims who can afford the trip. In recent times, over 5 million Muslims perform the Hajj every year.

== Notable structures ==
=== Kaaba ===
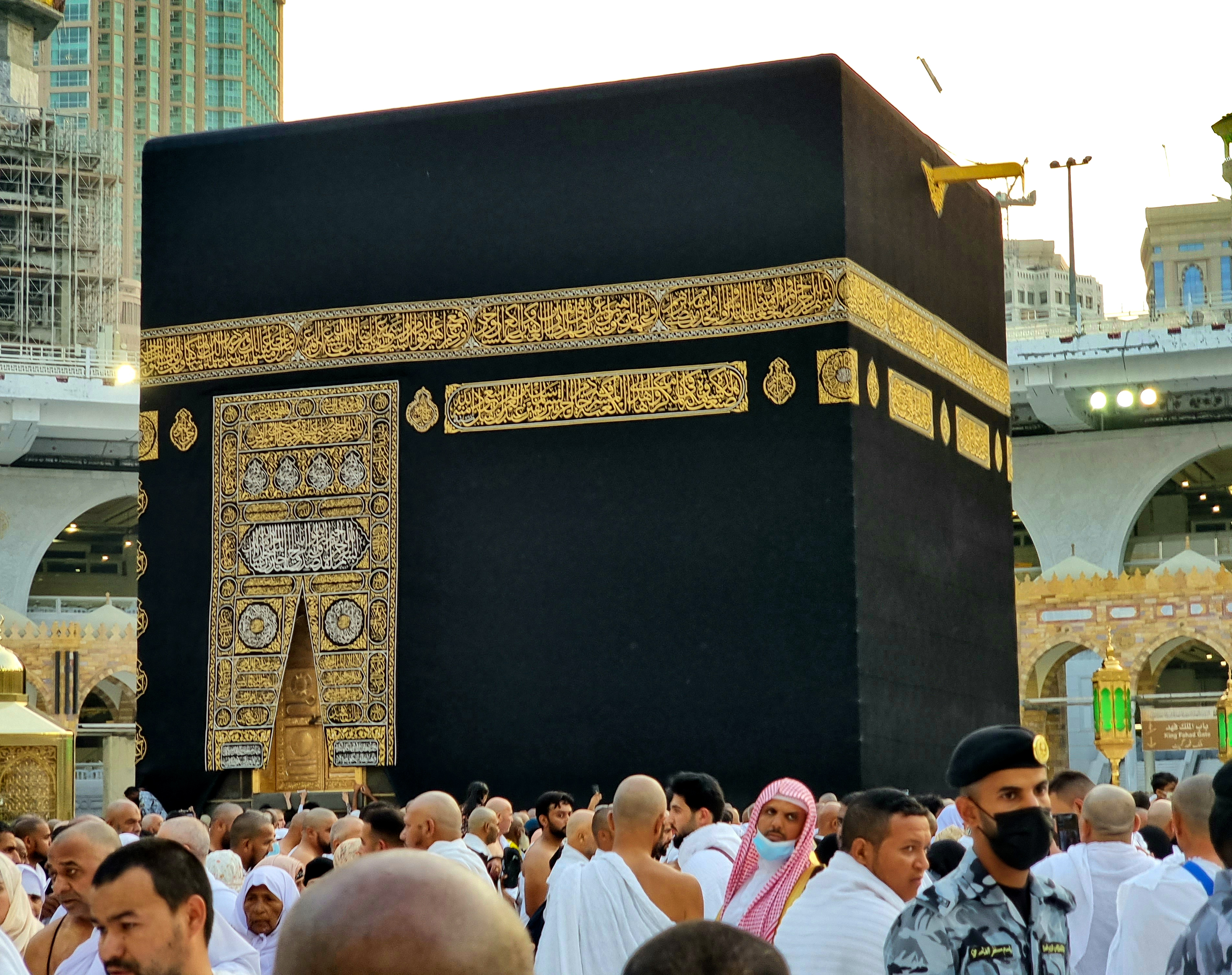
The Kaaba

The Kaaba is a cuboid-shaped building in the centre of the Masjid al-Haram and is the most sacred site in Islam. It is the qibla (direction of prayer) for Muslims worldwide. It is the focal point of the Hajj and Umrah rites. The pilgrims perform the tawaf (circumambulation) around its exterior. The Kaaba's fabric covering (kiswah) is replaced annually in a formal ceremony.

A technical drawing of the Kaaba showing dimensions and elements

==== Hatim ====
Adjacent to the Kaaba is the Hijr Ismail, also known as the Hatim, a low semi-circular wall that marks an area historically regarded as part of the original footprint of the Kaaba.

==== Black Stone ====
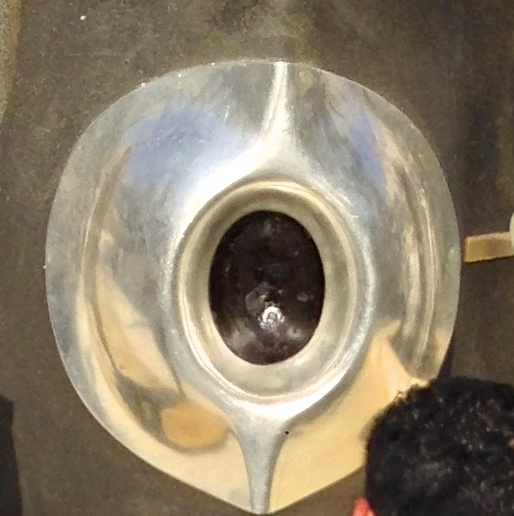
The Black Stone is seen through a portal in the Kaaba.

The Black Stone is set into the eastern corner of the Kaaba's external wall. Historically and culturally venerated in Islamic tradition, the stone today exists as several fragments within a silver frame and is a focal point of devotion during tawaf.

=== Mataf (Tawaf area) ===
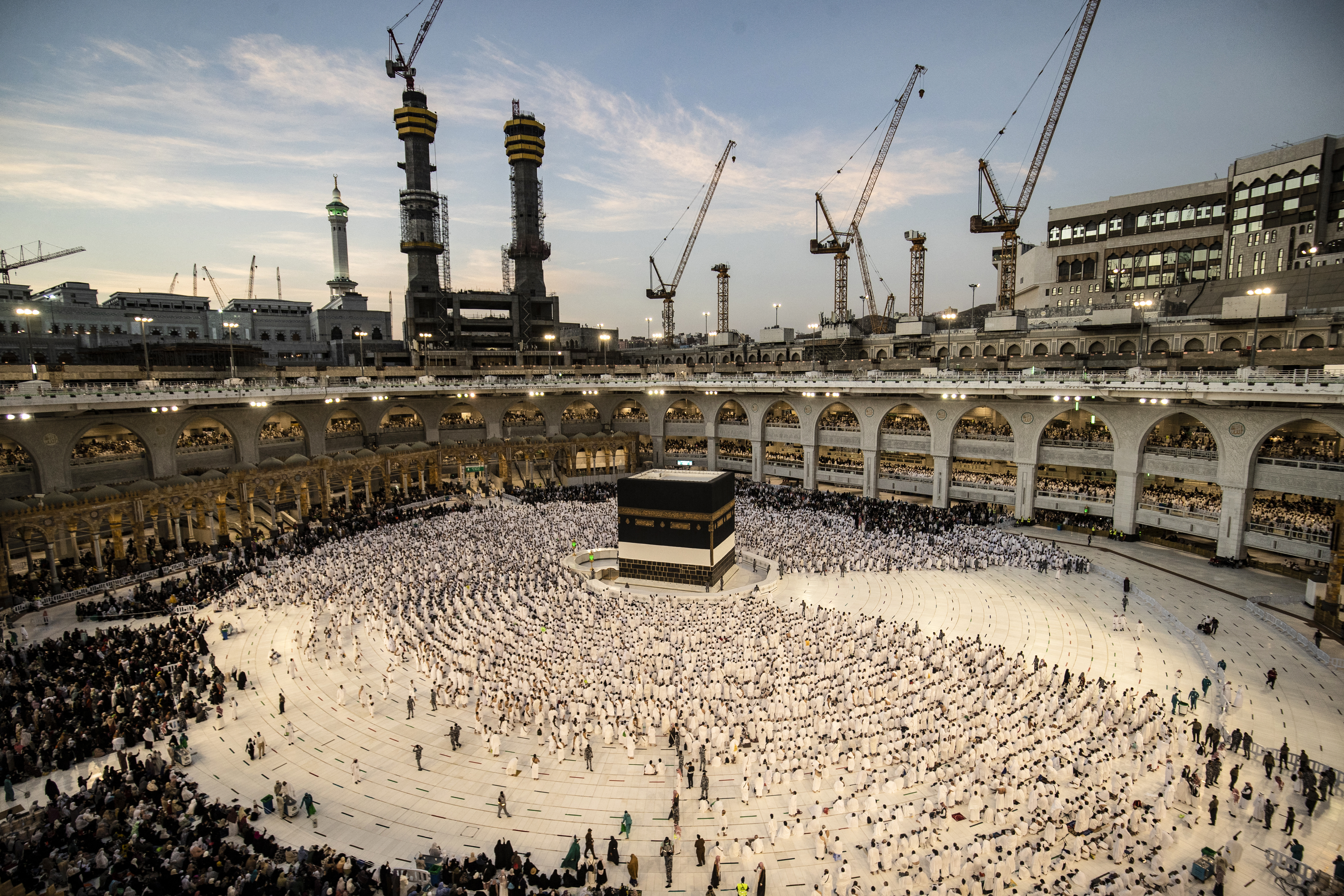
The Mataf full of worshipers

The mataf is the open, circular, paved area immediately surrounding the Kaaba where tawaf (circumambulation) is performed. Over centuries the mataf has been enlarged and modernised, including multi-level and climate-controlled expansions to accommodate the large and growing numbers of pilgrims that visit during Hajj and throughout the year. Major 20th- and 21st-century Saudi expansion programmes substantially increased the mataf’s capacity.

=== Maqam Ibrahim ===
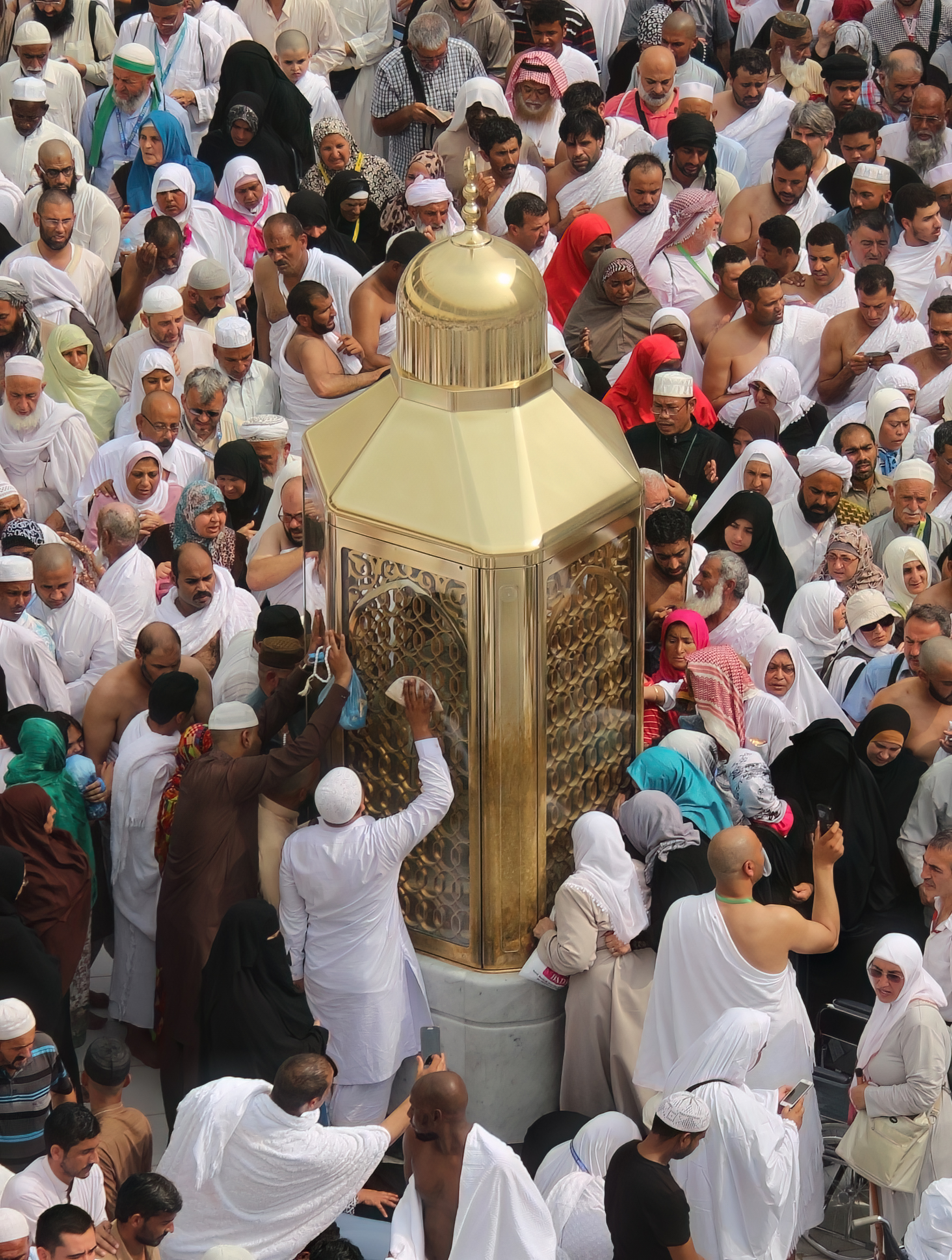
The enclosure of Maqam Ibrahim in Mataf area

Maqam Ibrahim is a small square stone associated in Islamic tradition with the Abraham (Ibrahim). It is displayed near the Kaaba under a protective enclosure. According to Islamic tradition, the imprint on the stone came from Abraham's feet. It is the only standing historic structure in the Mataf area out of at least six other, which were removed to clear the area for the circumambulation (tawaf).

=== Safa and Marwa ===
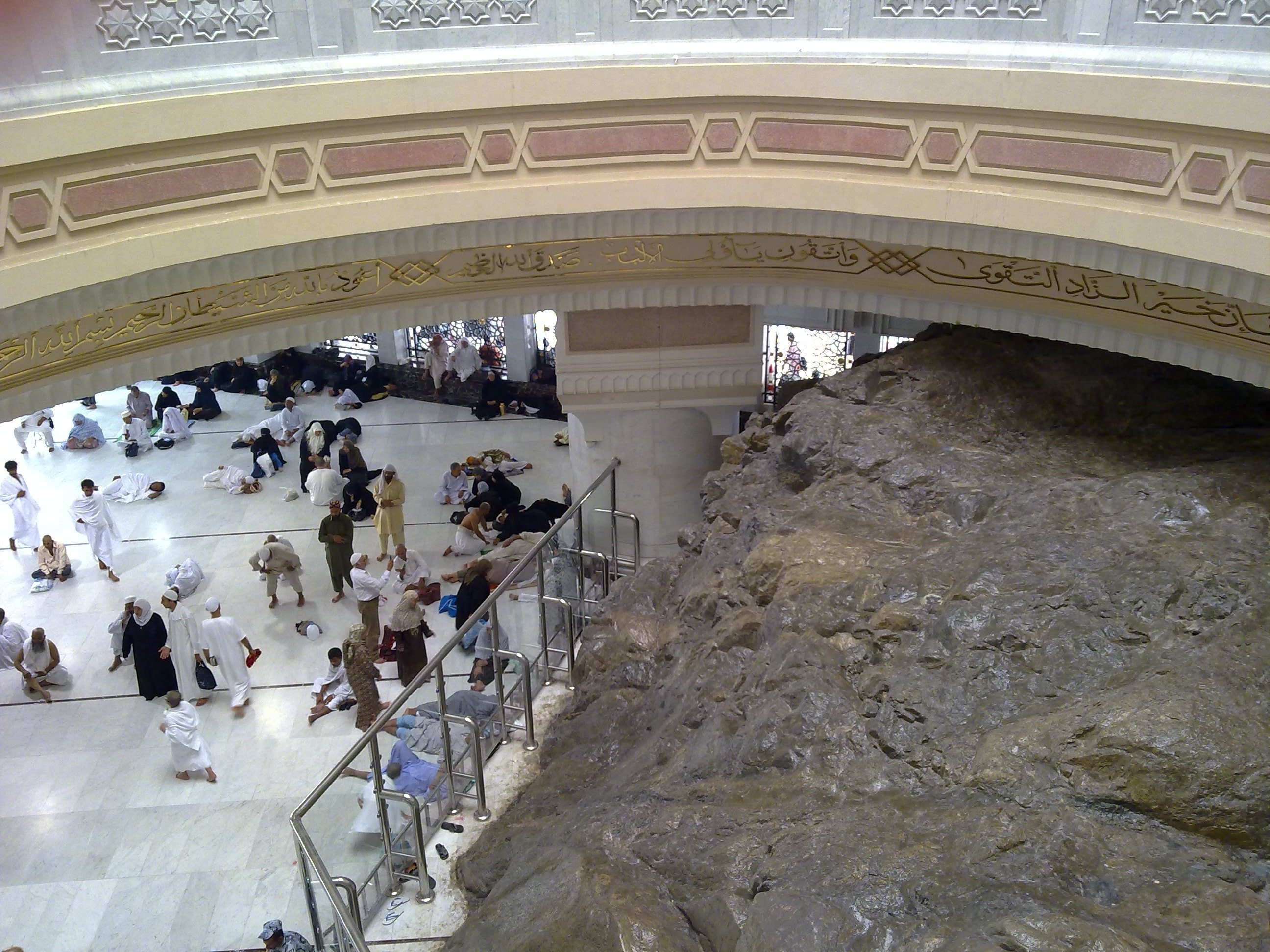
Mount Safa

Safa and Marwa are two small hills within the mosque precinct, connected by the enclosed al-Mas'a walkway, where pilgrims perform the saʿī ritual during Hajj and Umrah. The ritual commemorates Hājar (Hagar), wife of Abraham and mother of Ismail, who ran between the hills searching for water for her infant son. The area was historically separate but incorporated into Masjid al-Haram during 20th-century expansions.

=== Zamzam Well ===
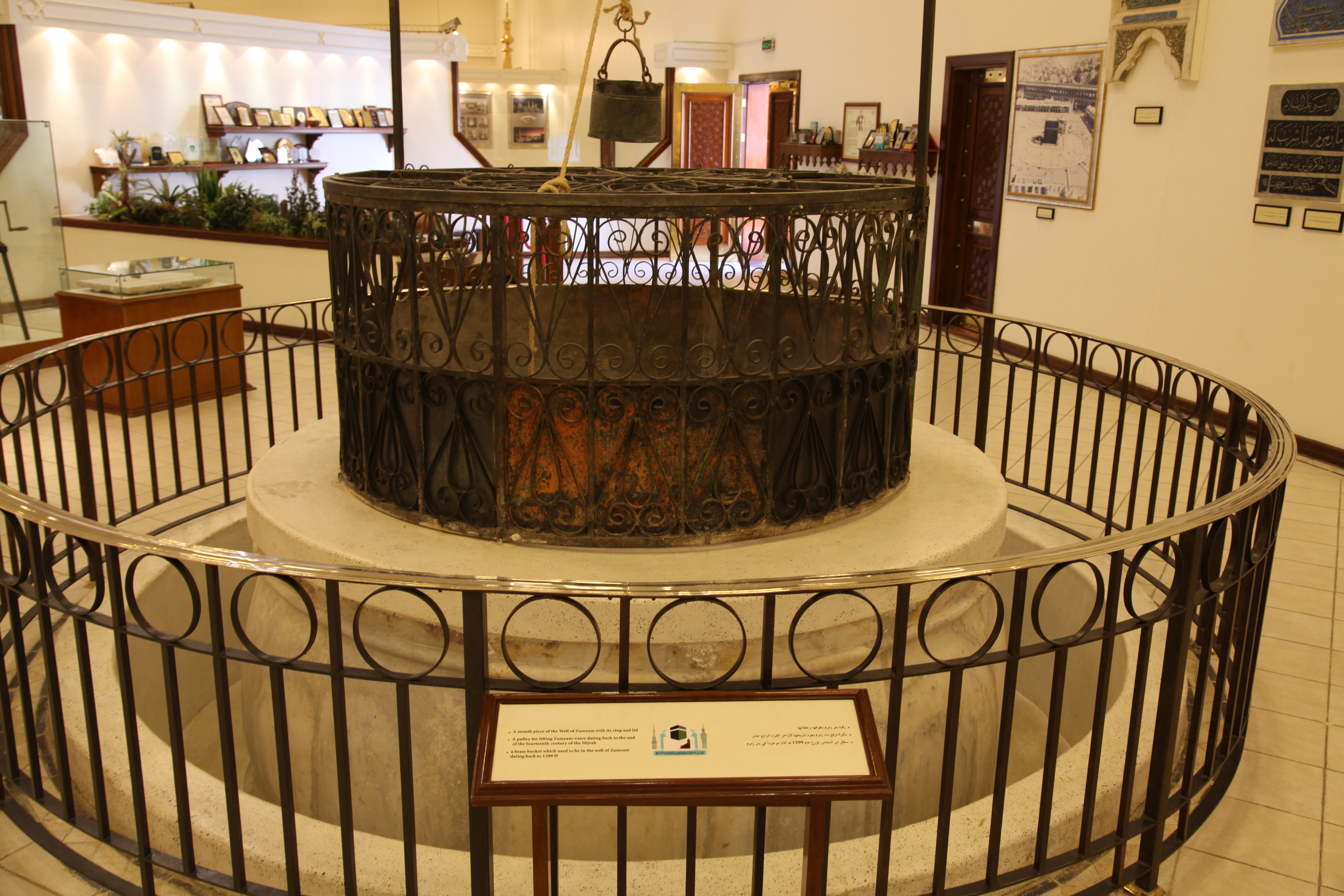
Mouth-piece of the Zamzam well from the Exhibition of the Two Holy Mosques Architecture Museum

The Zamzam well, located 20 m (66 ft) east of the Kaaba, is an ancient groundwater source traditionally linked to Hājar and Ishmael. Modern engineering has enclosed the well and provides Zamzam water to pilgrims through pumping, bottling and distribution systems.

== Destruction of heritage sites ==
Many of the Mosque’s historic and traditional structures were removed over time by Saudi-Wahhabi authorities ever since they took control of the site in December 1924. There has been controversy that the expansion projects of the mosque and Mecca itself are causing harm to early Islamic heritage. Many ancient buildings, some more than a thousand years old, have been demolished to make room for the expansions, starting with the First Modern Saudi Expansion (1950-1955).

Historically, the open courtyard (Mataf) surrounding the Kaaba contained several Ottoman- and Mamluk- era architectural structures that were removed during 20th century expansions of Masjid al-Haram:

1. The Four Maqams: Four domed prayer pavilions surrounding the Kaaba represented the four major Sunni schools of jurisprudence (mazhabs): Hanafi, Shafi'i, Maliki, and Hanbali. Historically, each school maintained its own designated imam who led congregation prayers from its respective pavilion. In the 1950s, these pavilions were dismantled under Saudi administration to unify congregational prayers behind a single imam of the Hanbali madhhab, and to allegedly clear space for pilgrims performing the circumambulation (Tawaf).
2. The Zamzam Well Pavilion (Qubbat Zamzam): The Well of Zamzam was traditionally enclosed within a two-story domed building where pilgrims gathered to access and drink the sacred water. The pavilion was demolished in 1963 to reduce congestion near the Kaaba. The wellhead was initially converted into an underground chamber before being completely sealed and paved over in 2003, with the water redirected to distribution taps and cooling stations throughout the complex.
3. The Dome of the Library (Qubbat al-Kutub): Located opposite the Zamzam pavilion, this twin-dome structure (also known as Qubbat al-Farashin) was historically used to store Koran manuscripts, mosque lighting apparatuses, and carpets. It was dismantled alongside surrounding courtyard structures during the mid-20th-century Saudi expansion.
4. Ottoman Marble Pulpit (Minbar): An intricately carved white marble pulpit, installed during the Ottoman period and used by the imam for Friday sermons, stood adjacent to the Mataf. It was removed during modern expansions to streamline movement around the sanctuary.

== Sound System ==
In 1998, Masjid al-Haram in Mecca received a major sound-system upgrade of exceptional scale and complexity. The project delivered a fully computerized system capable of transmitting the imam’s voice clearly and without distortion to millions of worshippers, both inside the mosque and up to three and a half miles away, while incorporating extreme redundancy so that prayer services can continue uninterrupted even if multiple microphones fail, a control room catches fire, or two power plants are lost.

Because non-Muslims are forbidden to enter Mecca, the work was carried out remotely. American automation specialist companies designed and programmed the system and trained a team of Saudi technicians to install and operate it. Approximately 6,000 custom-designed speakers and fiberglass horns were supplied along with the amplifiers. Twenty-five million feet of wiring were carefully laid in existing joints and crevices to avoid damaging the mosque’s centuries-old marble walls.

The new system, which replaced a twenty-year-old manual installation, is controlled by fourteen main computers (seven in a backup room), 380 amplifiers, and 126 microphones arranged at seven locations around the Kaaba. Each microphone stand carries nine microphones to cover standing, kneeling, and prostrate positions, with additional spare stands available. Multiple layers of backup power and equipment ensure continuous operation five times a day, every day of the year.

The project was a gift to the mosque from a prominent Saudi construction company. After two years of design meetings held in Cairo and London, the system started being installed in late 1998, with a demonstration scheduled for King Fahd.

== Notable contemporary Imams ==
- Abd ar-Rahman as-Sudais, appointed Imam and Khatib in 1984. (Chief Imam and President of the Affairs of the Two Holy Mosques)
- Salih bin Abdullah al Humaid, appointed Imam and Khatib in 1982. Former Chairman of Majlis Ash-Shura (Consultative Assembly of Saudi Arabia)
- Usama bin Abdullah Khayyat, appointed Imam and Khatib in 1998.
- Maher al-Mu'aiqly, appointed Imam in 2007, and Khatib in 2016.
- Abdullah Awad Al Juhany, appointed Imam in 2007 and Khatib in 2019.
- Bandar Baleela, appointed Imam in 2013, and Khatib in 2019.
- Yasser Al-Dosari, appointed Imam in 2019 and Khatib in 2022.
- Saud Al-Shuraim, appointed Imam in 1991, and retired in 2022.

== See also ==
- Al-Aqsa
- Holiest sites in Islam
- Ḥ-R-M
- Incidents during the Hajj
- Islam in Saudi Arabia
- List of mosques in Saudi Arabia
- List of the oldest mosques
  - Masjid As-Sahabah in Massawa, Eritrea
- Masar Destination
- Al-Rayah Mosque
