= Safa and Marwa =

Two holy hillocks in Mecca, Saudi Arabia

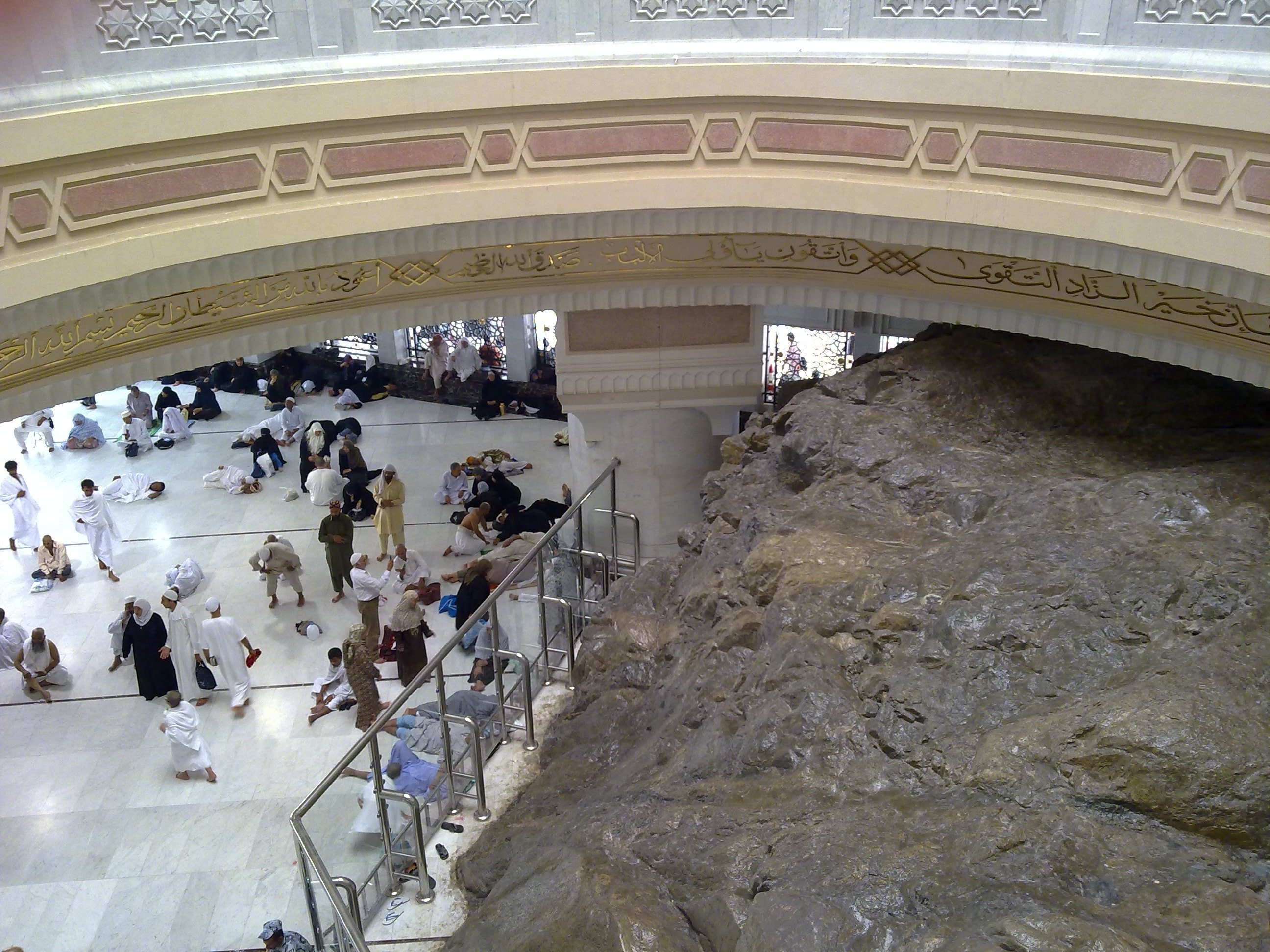
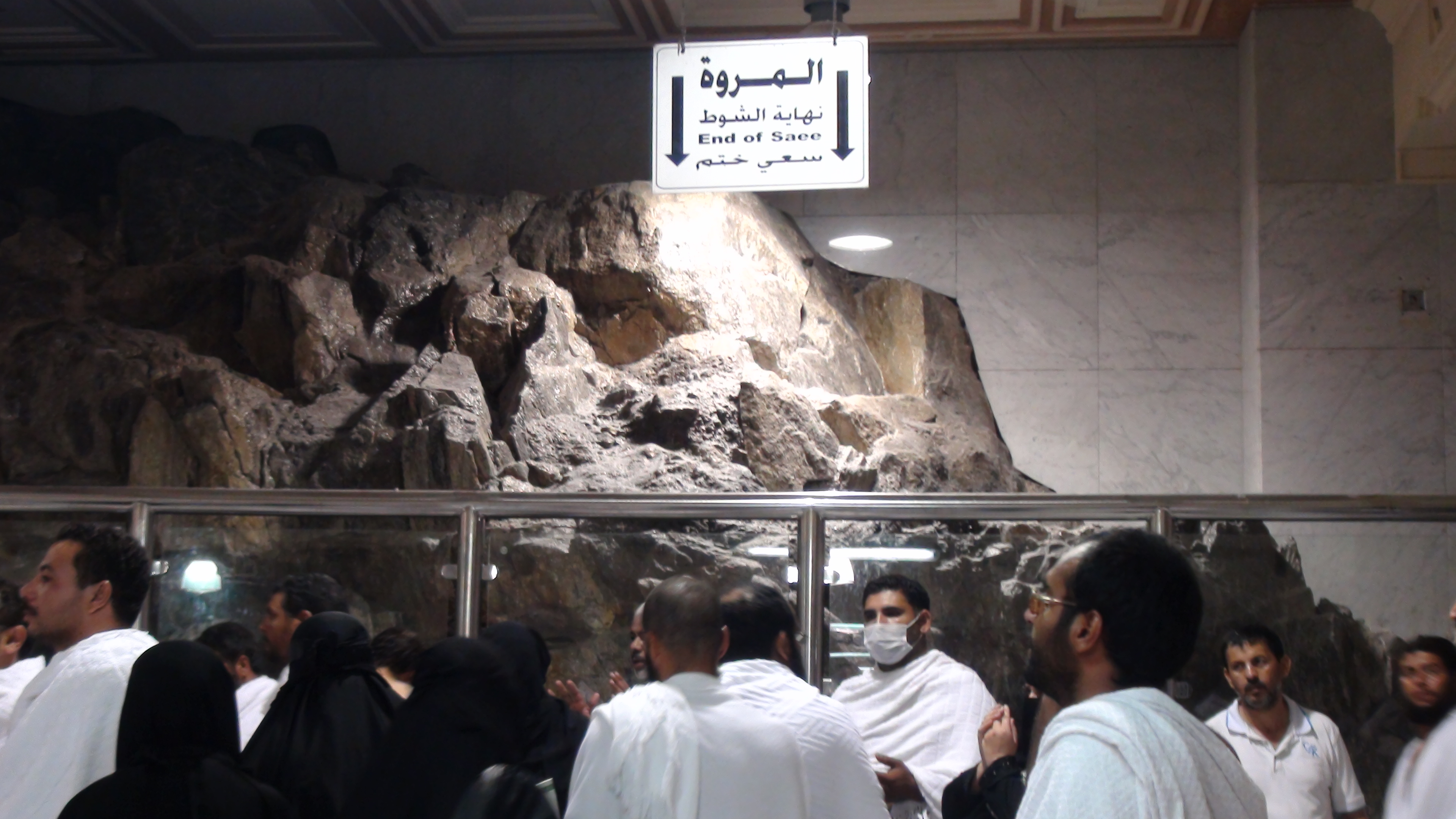
- Left: Mount Safa; Right: Mount Marwa

Highest point
- Parent peak: Safa: Abu Qubais; Marwa: Qaiqan
- Coordinates: 21°25′25″N 39°49′38″E

Naming
- Native name: Aṣ-Ṣafā wal-Marwah (Arabic); ٱلصَّفَا وَٱلْمَرْوَة (Arabic)

Geography
- Location within Saudi Arabia Location within Middle East Location within West and Central Asia
- Country: Saudi Arabia
- Region: Hejaz
- Province: Mecca
- City: Mecca
- Parent range: Hijaz Mountains

Safa and Marwa (Arabic: ٱلصَّفَا وَٱلْمَرْوَة, romanized: Aṣ-Ṣafā wal-Marwah) are two small hills, connected to the larger Abu Qubais and Qaiqan mountains, respectively, in Mecca, Saudi Arabia, now made part of Al-Masjid al-Haram. Muslims travel back and forth between them seven times, in what is known as saʿī,(Arabic: سَعِي, lit. 'seeking/searching or walking') during the ritual pilgrimages of Ḥajj and Umrah.

Muslims run between the two mountains, which they believe was made a ritual as a tribute to Hajar's search of water for her child dying of thirst until she found a water source in the Zamzam Well. The space between the two mountains in which the pilgrims run is called al-Mas'aa.

== Geography ==
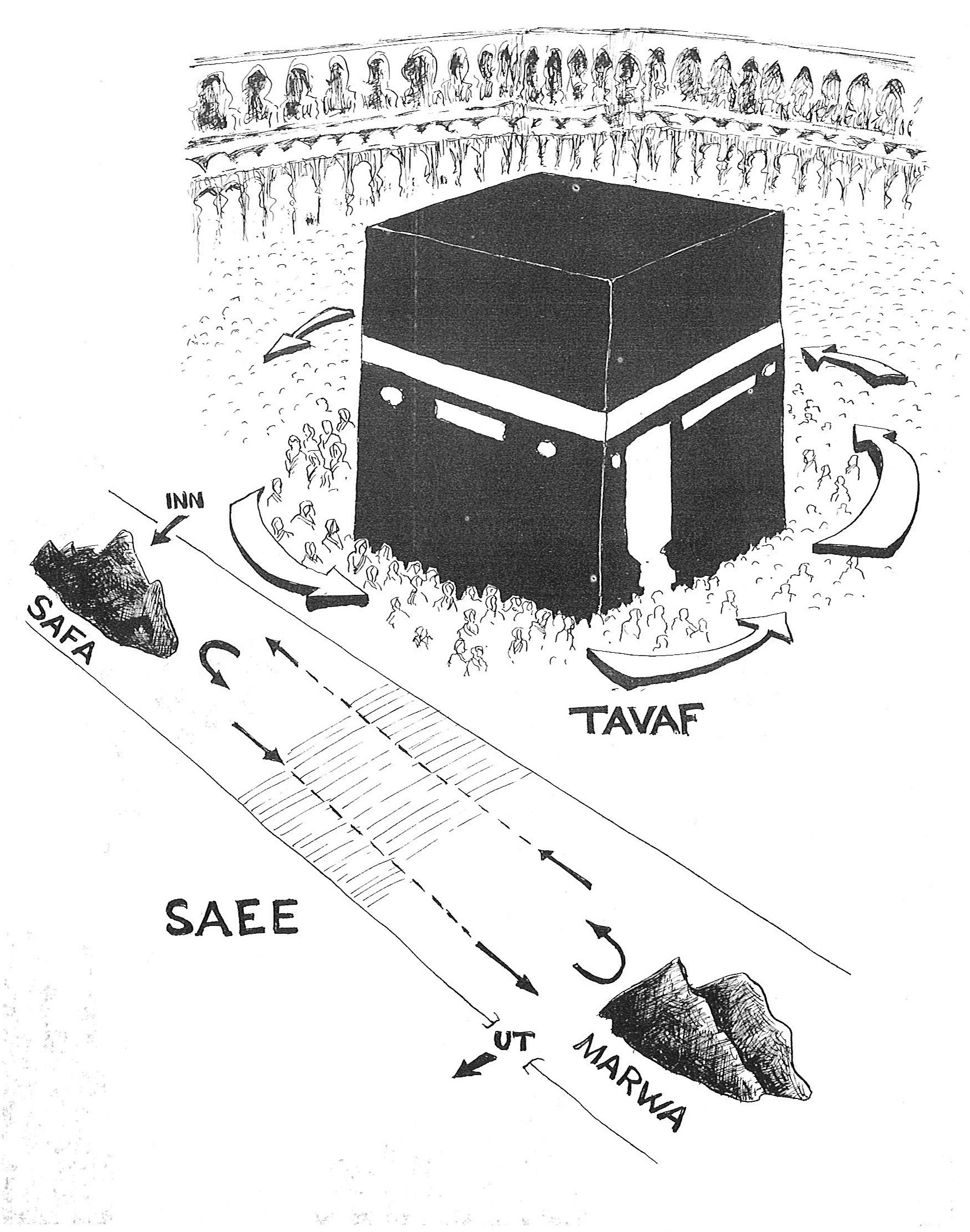
Path of movement between Safa and Marwa, illustrated alongside the Tawaf or circumambulation of the Kaaba

Safa is a small mountain located at the bottom of the Abu Qubais Mountain, about 130 m (140 yd) southeast of the Ka'bah, which is the beginning of the Sa'ee. As for Marwa, it is also a small mountain of white stone, located 300 m (330 yd) to the northeast of the Ka'bah and it is connected to Qaiqan Mountain, marking the end of the Sa'ee. Safa, Marwah and the Masa'a (space between the two mountains) were located outside the Masjid al-Haram and were separate until the year 1955/56 (1375 AH), when the project to annex the two sites into the Masjid al-Haram was undertaken for the first time, and they were subsequently annexed. The distance between Safa and Marwa is approximately 450 m (490 yd), therefore, seven trips back and forth amount to about 3.2 km (2 mi).

== History ==
=== Geological perspective ===
The individual geological history of the two mountains is relatively unknown. Marwa has been described as smoother and lighter in color than Safa, with some even calling it white, such as Majd ad-Din Ferozabadi, az-Zubaidi, al-Fayoumi. al-Alusi further went on to say that Safa's color was comparable to a tint of red. Safa and Marwa are a part of the Hejaz mountain range, which run parallel to most of the Saudi coast on the Red Sea. The Hejaz themselves are part of the larger Sarawat range, which is characterized by young and jagged mountains.

=== Islamic narrative ===
In Islamic tradition, the civilization of Mecca started after Ibrāhīm (Abraham) left his son Ismāʿīl (Ishmael) and wife Hājar (Hagar) in the valley, which Muslims believe was a command by God. When their provisions were exhausted, Hajar eventually ran out of food and water and could no longer breastfeed Ismail. She thus ran back and forth seven times between Safa and Marwa hoping to find water. To make her search easier and faster, she went alone, leaving the infant on the ground. She first climbed the nearest hill, Safa, to look over the surrounding area. When she saw nothing, she then went to the other hill, Marwah, to look around. While Hagar was on either hillside, she was able to see Ishmael and know he was safe. However, when she was in the valley between the hills she was unable to see her son, and would thus run whilst in the valley and walk at a normal pace when on the hillsides. Hagar traveled back and forth between the hills seven times in the scorching heat before returning to her son. Allah then sent Angel Jibril (Gabriel) to their aid and a spring of water appeared from the ground. The well was named Zamzam and the journey back and forth Safa and Marwa was made a ritual during Hajj and Umrah. The two mountains are mentioned by name in the Quran 2:158.

=== Before Muhammad ===
The early Ansari Muslims gave up the custom of Sa'ee seeing it as idol worship and shirk and a sign of the pre-Islamic period of ignorance (jahiliyyah). It is in this context that Verse 158 of Surah 2 was revealed (Sahih Bukhari, Vol. 6, Book 60, Hadith 22/23). In another narration by Abdullah Yusuf Ali in his commentary on Verse 2:158, he argues that the verse had been revealed because the pagans of Quraysh had placed two idols atop the two hills and the Muslims felt hesitant to walk between the hills, seeing it as idol worship or as an act of shirk. Anas ibn Malik also said that he felt hatred in walking between the two hills as he saw it as a pre-Islamic custom from the jahiliyyah until Allah had revealed Verse 2:158 (Sahih Bukhari, Vol. 2). Aisha confirmed the verse had been revealed with regards to the Ansar, who said it was sinful to walk between the hills as they used to visit the idol Manat at Qudaid (near Mecca) in the state of Ihram before going about with the rituals of their pilgrimage in pre-Islamic times. Several similar reasons have been given by multiple scholars of Islam, including al-Suyuti in his Asbab an-Nuzul and George Sale in his Preliminary Discourse to the Quran.

The names Safa and Marwa are similar to two hills near to Jerusalem: Mount Scopus (known in Hellenistic times as Sapha) and Moriah (site of the binding of Isaac, traditionally identified with Temple Mount), which has led to a theory that the ritual was originally practiced at Jerusalem, or that the hills of Mecca were named after the hills at Jerusalem.

== Significance in the Hajj and Umrah ==
Performing the Sa'ee serves to commemorate Hajar's search for water for her son and God's mercy in answering prayers. Two walkways guide pilgrims from Safa to Marwa, and from Marwa to Safa, with two narrower walkways in the center to serve elderly and disabled pilgrims. The walkways between the two mountains are collectively called the Mas'aa (Arabic: المسعى, romanized: al-Mas'aa, lit. 'way, place of walking') and are air-conditioned. Water pumped from the Zamzam Well is also available on the way. Sa'ee is an integral part and rukn of Hajj and Umrah.

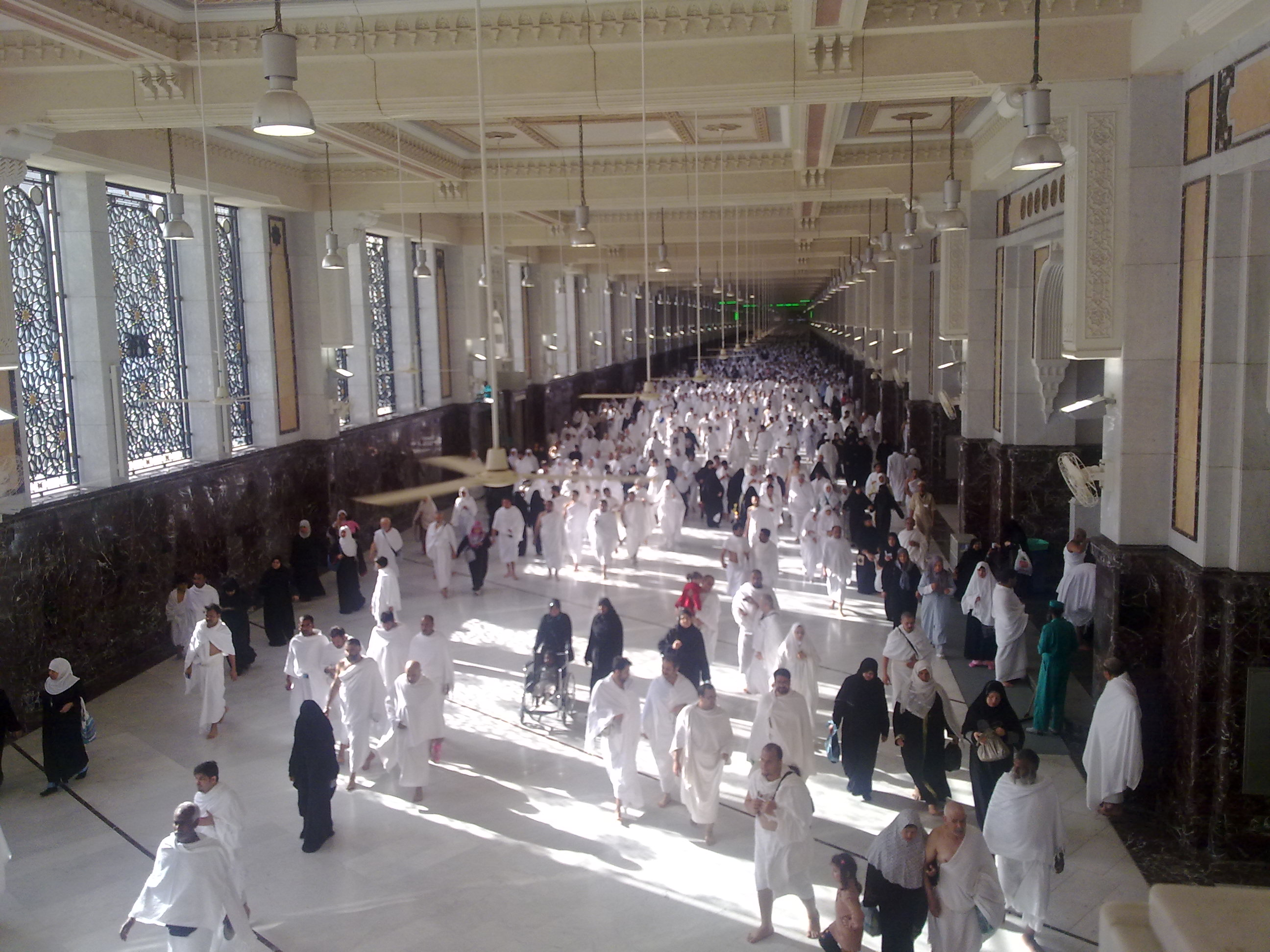
The first walkway of the Mas'aa leading from Safa to Marwa

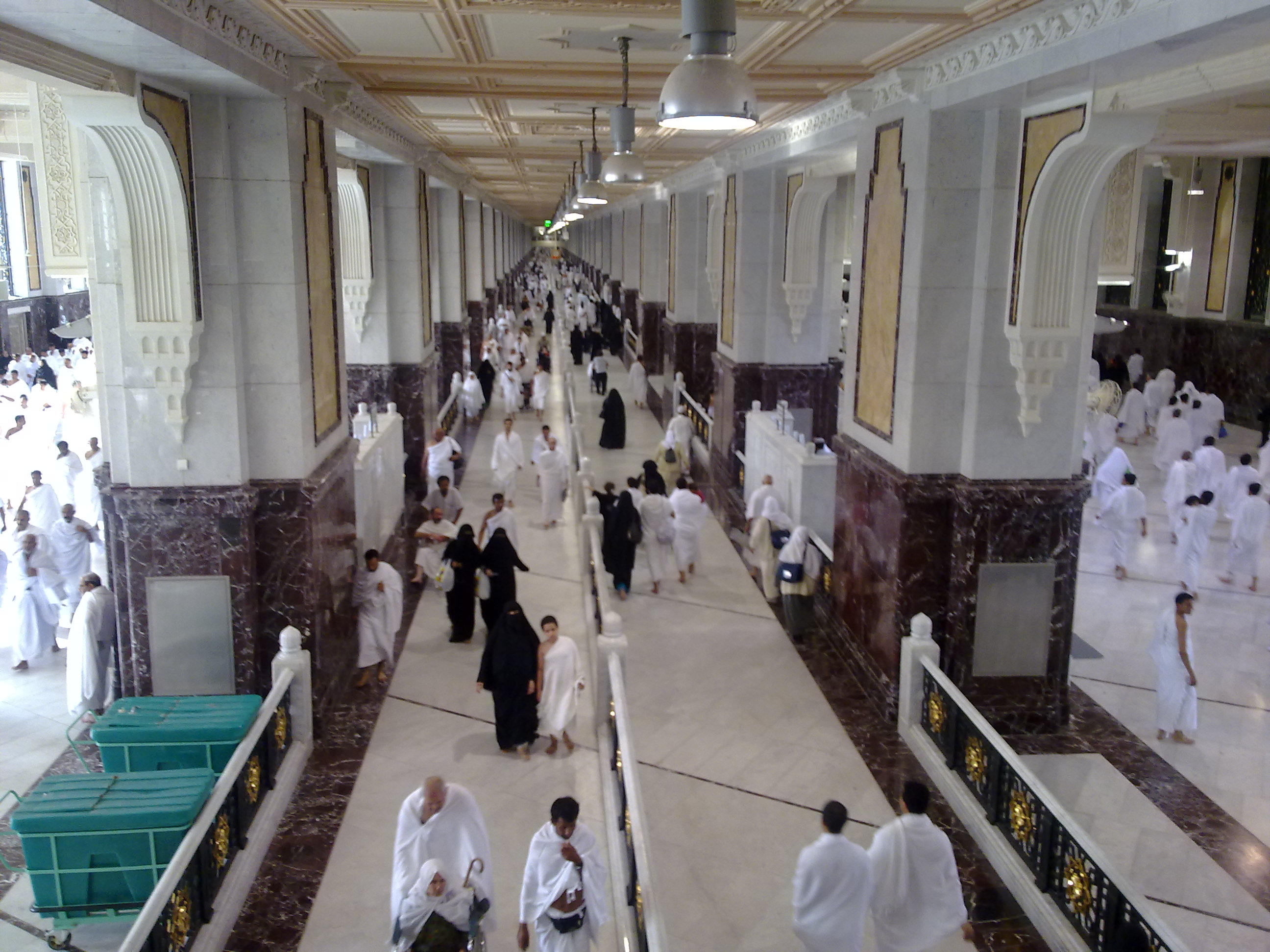
Central section reserved for the elderly and disabled

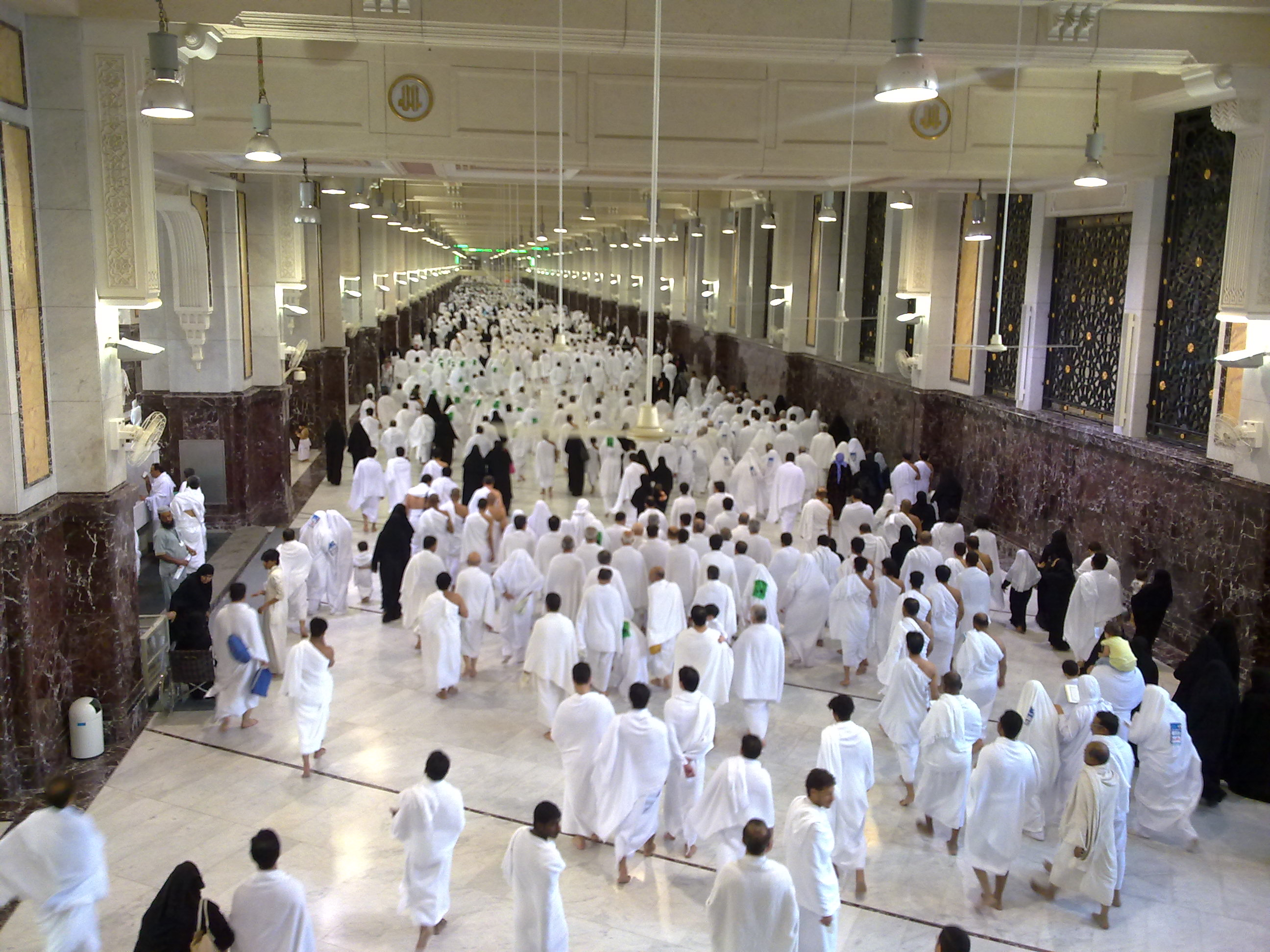
The second walkway returning from Marwa to Safa

== See also ==
- Sarawat Mountains
