= Zamzam Well =

Well in the Masjid al-Haram in Mecca

- بئر زمزم (Arabic)
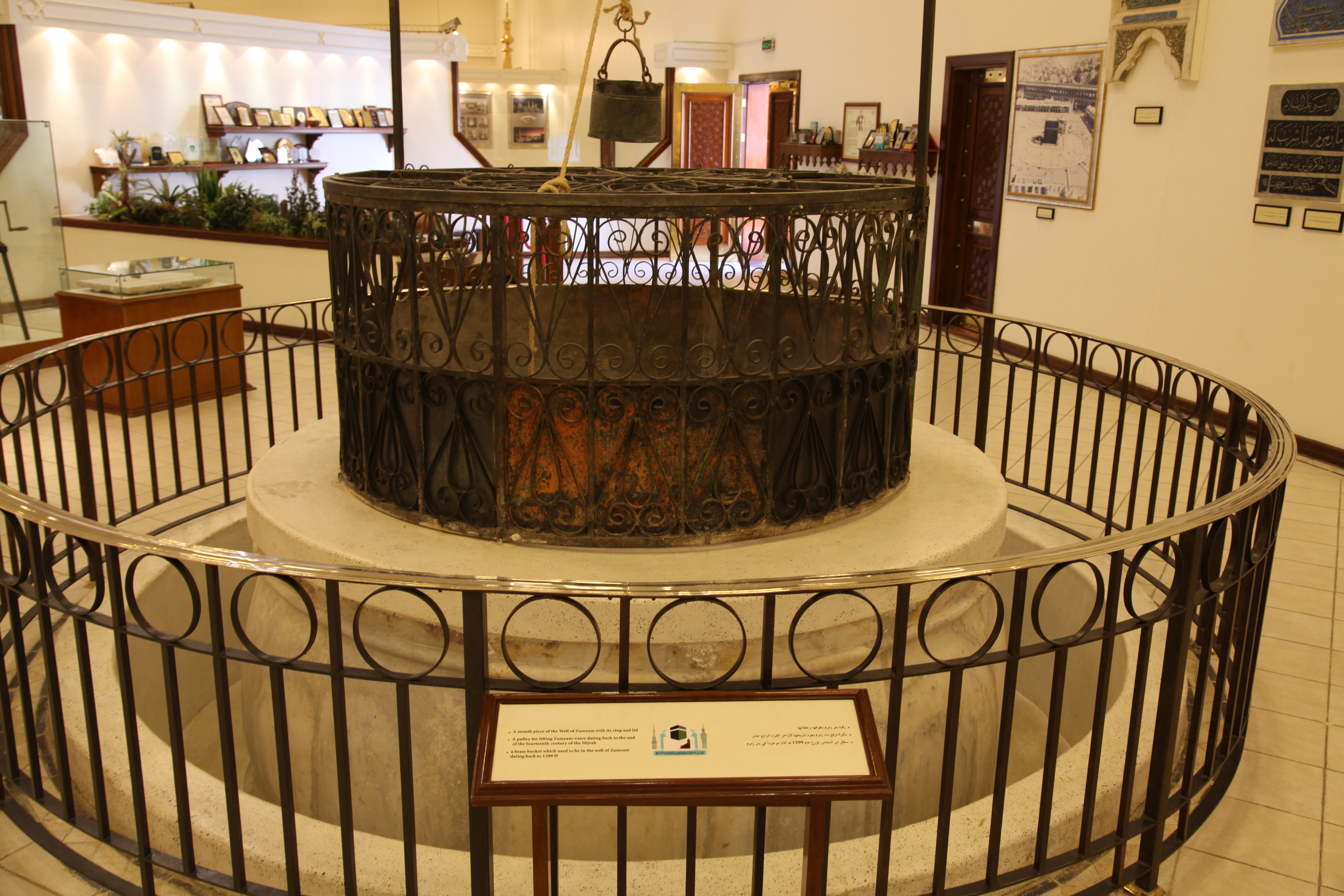
- Mouth-piece of the Zamzam well from the Exhibition of the Two Holy Mosques Architecture Museum

- Location of Zamzam Well in Mecca, Saudi Arabia
- 21°25′19.2″N 39°49′33.6″E
- Location: Masjid al-Haram, Mecca

Site notes
- Area: about 30 m (98 ft) deep and 1.08 to 2.66 m (3 ft 7 in to 8 ft 9 in) in diameter
- Restored: traditional Islamic narratives date the well's (re-)establishment to the 6th century
- Restored by: ʿAbd al-Muṭṭalib according to traditional Islamic narratives

The Zamzam Well (Arabic: بئر زمزم, romanized: Biʾru Zamzam Arabic pronunciation: [biʔru zam.zam]) is a well located within the Masjid al-Haram in Mecca, Saudi Arabia. It is located 20 m (66 ft) east of the Kaaba, the holiest place in Islam.

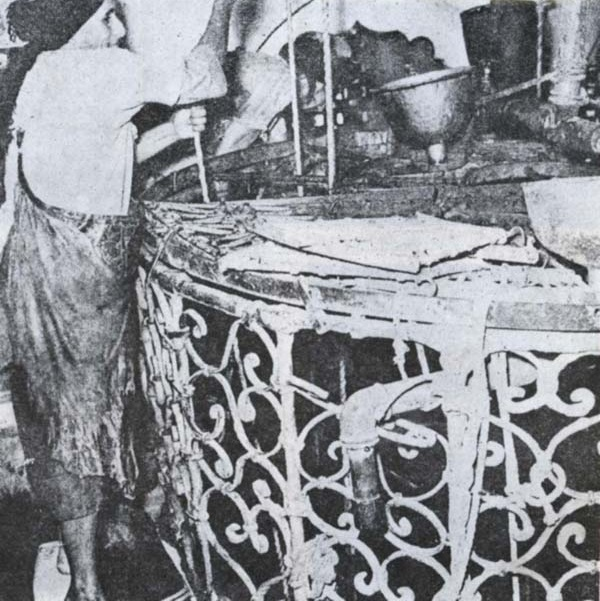
A person extracting water from the well prior to the installation of a pump

In Islamic narratives, the well is a miraculously generated source of water, which opened up thousands of years ago when Ismaʿil (Ishmael), the son of Ibrahim (Abraham), was left with his mother Hajar (Hagar) in the desert. It is said to have dried up or been buried while the tribe Jurhum lived in the area. The well is claimed to have been rediscovered and excavated in the 6th century by Abd al-Muttalib, grandfather of the Islamic prophet Muhammad.

== Etymology ==
The origin of the name is uncertain. According to historian Jacqueline Chabbi, the noun Arabic: زمزم, romanized: Zamzam is an onomatopoeia. She associates the noun with the adjectives Arabic: زمزم, romanized: zamzam and Arabic: زمازم, romanized: zumāzim which are onomatopoeic denoting a dull sound stemming from either a distant roll (of thunder) or a guttural sound emitted with a closed mouth by animals or people, however meaning either 'an abundant supply of water' or 'a source of water which does not dry up' if applied to Arabic: ماء, romanized: māʾ, lit. 'water'. She states that this latter meaning of an unintelligible guttural sound encompasses a layer of meaning associated with the sacred and mystical, in addition to the basic notion of the sound possibly being related to the concept of an abundant flow of water.

Early Islamic sources use the terms Arabic: زمزم, romanized: zamzama and Arabic: زمازم, romanized: zamāzima to refer to the religious rites of Zoroastrianism and the Zoroastrians. The terms are onomatopoeic and derive from what Arabs perceived to be an indistinct, droning sound of the recitation of Avestan prayers and scriptures by Magi. (Note: "ZAMZAMA (A.), in early Arabic "the confused noise of distant thunder" (Lane, 1249b), but widely used in the sources for early Islamic history for the priests of the Magians reciting and intoning the Zoroastrian prayers and scriptures, producing (to the Arabs' ears) an indistinct, droning sound. Thus in al-Ṭabarī, i, 1042, we have the zamzama of the Herbadhs, in 2874 the muzamzim or adherent of Zoroastrianism, and in 2880 zamzama for the Zoroastrian rites and zamāzima for the Magians in general.")

Medieval Arabic writers like al-Masʿūdī generally state the well is named on the account of Arabic: زمزم, romanized: zamzama, lit. 'prayers recited by Zoroastrians'. They argue that based on their "kinship with Abraham" Zoroastrians regularly made pilgrimages to Mecca to pray over the well. A later account by al-ʿAynī claims that the well is named after Arabic: زمازم, romanized: zamāzima supposedly meaning 'bridles' which had been donated to the well by and named after Sasan, the Zoroastrian progenitor of the Sasanian Empire.

Other medieval Arabic sources connect the name to the Angel Gabriel being the source of the murmuring being captured by this onomatopoeia.

Hughes additionally identifies a tradition of deriving the name from an exclamation supposedly made by Hajar either being Arabic: زم، زم!, romanized: zamm, zamm!, lit. 'fill, fill!' or supposedly Egyptian meaning "Stop, stop!". (Note: George Sale speaks of this claim in an introductory essay to his translation of the Quran. He however states that it was most likely named after the "murmuring of its waters".)

== Traditional accounts ==
=== Traditional origins ===
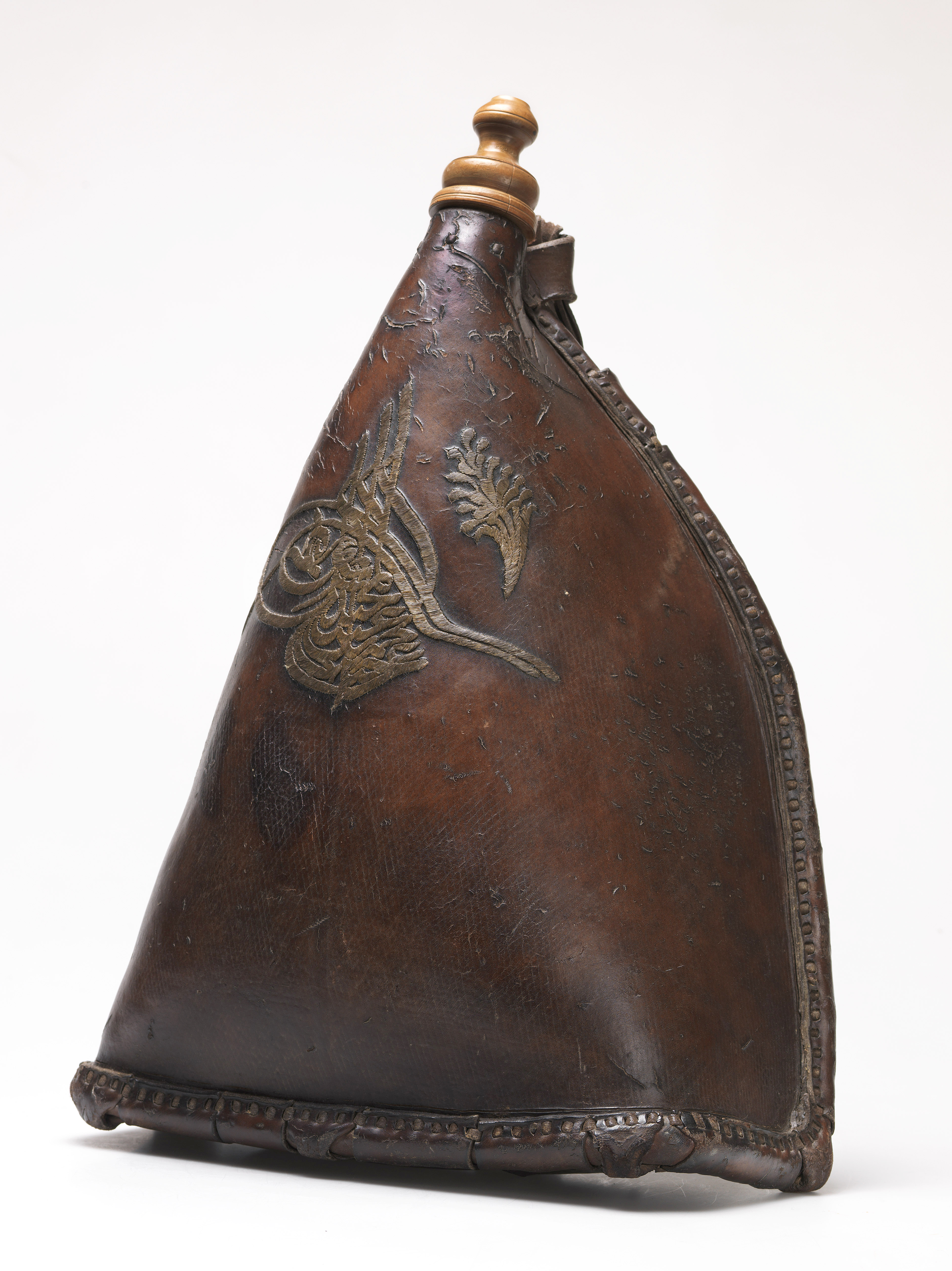
An imperial pilgrim's water flask from Ottoman Turkey, used to collect water from the Zamzam Well, bearing the Sultan's tughra

Islamic tradition states that the Zamzam Well was opened up in some form by God to assist Hajar, the second wife of Ibrahim and mother of Ismaʿil. In Islamic narratives Ibrahim, commanded by God, led Hajar and Ismaʿil to the area of present-day Mecca, there he left them alone in the desert. The two are narrated to have been suffering severely from thirst. In some versions of the story Hajar walks back and forth between the two hills of Safa and Marwah in search of water. (Note: Some records state this to have occurred seven times. Muslim pilgrims during Hajj similarly walk seven-times between these two hills, an act ritual anámnēsis stemming from a belief in the traditional account of the well's appearance.) The story of the appearance of the well either involves the infant Isma'il scraping the ground with his feet and water springing out or God sending Gabriel (Jibra'il) who consequently opens up the well using a variety of methods depending on the narration. The wealth of mystic discourses discussing the history of the well is from the Abbasid era and largely extra-Quranic, as the well is not referred to directly by the Quran.

According to Islamic tradition, Ibrahim rebuilt a shrine called Arabic: بيت ٱللَّٰه, romanized: Baytu 'l-llah, lit. 'House of God' near the site of the well. A building supposedly first constructed by Adam, which Muslim tradition regards as the origin of the Kaʿba. (Note: Presently the well is located approximately 20 m (66 ft) east of the Kaaba.) The well is meant to have dried up (possibly as punishment) during the settlement of the tribe of the Jurhum, who initially are meant to have migrated to the area from Yemen. In some narrations focused on the objects deposited in Zamzam the well simply dries up, then prior to the Jurhum being forced to leave Mecca because of God expelling them for their misdeeds their leader buries sacred objects from the Kaʿba in the location of Zamzam. In others, focused on the well itself, the objects are placed in Zamzam itself, with the well ultimately being buried by the leader of the Jurhum.

=== Traditional rediscovery ===
According to traditional Muslim accounts, ʿAbd al-Muṭṭalib is responsible for the rediscovery of the well. He purportedly had a divine precognition about the well at some point in his life. A common narrative relayed by Ibn Ishaq via Ibn Hisham involves four dreams, the first three concern mysterious objects called Arabic: طيبة, romanized: Ṭayba, Arabic: برة, romanized: Barra and Arabic: المضنونة, romanized: al-Maḍnūna he is meant to dig for, the fourth then names Zamzam. Other accounts omit the third dream naming Arabic: المضنونة, romanized: al-Maḍnūna. (Note: Hawting's analysis indicates that the fourth dream naming Zamzam may be a late addition to this oral tradition.) Following ʿAbd al-Muṭṭalib's precognitions to dig, he is claimed to have found a number of artefacts: golden gazelle figurines, armour, and several specimens of a type of sword called Arabic: السيف القلعى, romanized: as-Sayf al-Qalaʿī, lit. 'Qalaʿī sword'. Ibn Saʿd relays two separate traditions regarding the discovery of a well by ʿAbd al-Muṭṭalib, one involving Zamzam's discovery and water disputes among the Quraysh, the other involving the series of dreams and said artefacts but neither water nor the name Zamzam.

Hawting's analysis argues that the oral traditions surrounding the Arabic: بئر الكعبة, romanized: Biʾru 'l-Kaʿba, lit. 'Well of the Kaʿba', a dry well inside the Kaʿba reputed to have been used as the treasury of the Kaʿba and as a place for religious offerings in pre-Islamic Mecca and Zamzam merged at some point with stories concerning the former being adapted to feature the latter.

=== Subsequent history ===
Commentators of the Abbasid-era mystic discourses surrounding the well, like al-Masʿūdī expanded on these extra-Quranic accounts. They further connect the site to Zoroastrianism via what they interpret to be Zoroastrian religious artefacts uncovered by ʿAbd al-Muṭṭalib in combination with their etymological analyses. Ultimately arguing that due to the well's history supposedly being related to (what they perceive to have been) the true religion of the peoples of Iran, the Islamisation of Iran is to be understood and framed as a rediscovery.

The traditional Islamic account of the well's history relayed by al-Azraqī traces the lineage of its management via to Abū Tālib as inherited from its (re)-discoverer and his father ʿAbd al-Muṭṭalib. The usage rights to the well were then supposedly sold due to Abū Tālib's financial troubles to his brother, al-ʿAbbās, who is meant to have instituted the first new ordinance concerning the well by banning all non-religious body-hygienic uses of it. Thus the management of the Zamzam Well (a responsibility called Arabic: سقاية, romanized: siqāya, lit. 'giving of water') was reputedly a hereditary position of the Abbasids, i.e. the progeny of al-ʿAbbās, who ended up seizing control over Mecca as a whole using their caliphate. Buildings called the Arabic: بيت الشراب, romanized: Baytu 'š-Šarrāb, lit. 'House of Drinking', variously referred to also as the Arabic: قبات الشراب, romanized: Qubbātu 'š-Šarāb, lit. 'Domes of Drinking', were structures used to store jars of Zamzam water away from the heat. One of which is claimed to have been initially built on orders from and named after Abbas, founder of the Abbasid dynasty himself. (Note: The other having been called the Dome of the Jews.) However, al-Azraqī describes the well being fully in the open during the age of ʿAbdallāh, son of ʿAbbās. He reports it being surrounded by two pools: one pool between the well and a corner of the Kaʿba, used for quenching the thirst of pilgrims; and another pool behind the well used for wuḍūʾ, i.e. religious ritual cleaning, with a subterranean drainage channel leading the waste water out of the Masjid al-Haram's courtyard. He describes the well's operators pouring the water drawn alternately between the pools using waterskins. In the years 775–778 the second Abbasid caliph, al-Mansur, sponsored extensive construction projects in the Masjid al-Haram, which included paving the area around Zamzam with marble. Beginning in the years 833–855, during the rule of al-Muʿtasim, a civil servant called ʿUmar ibn Faraǧ ar-Ruḫḫaǧī began a series of construction projects related to the well, all marked by their intricate use of mosaics. He ended up constructing a dome covering the well and demolishing a previous structure surrounding it. (Note: Possibly having simply been a light wall made of stones according to some sources) Additionally a dome connecting the new dome over the well and the House of Drinking was constructed. Ar-Ruḫḫaǧī had the House of Drinking demolished in 843–844, during the rule of al-Wathiq, and went on to have three small domes surrounding the dome covering Zamzam built in its stead.

In the year 930 a minority branch of Ismaʿilism called the Qarmatians launched an attack on Mecca. They had previously attacked many caravans of the Abbasid Caliphate, including those of pilgrims travelling to the city. They would seize the Black Stone and move it to the capital of their own state in Bahrayn for 22 years. They were briefly led in 931 by a Persian, al-Isfahani, whom they believed to be God incarnate who unsuccessfully attempted to convert the Qarmatian state to Zoroastrianism. They destroyed the dome covering Zamzam. It is relayed by historians such as Qutb ad-Dīn that in the aftermath of their attack on the city, the Well Zamzam, as well as all other wells in the city were filled with corpses of pilgrims.

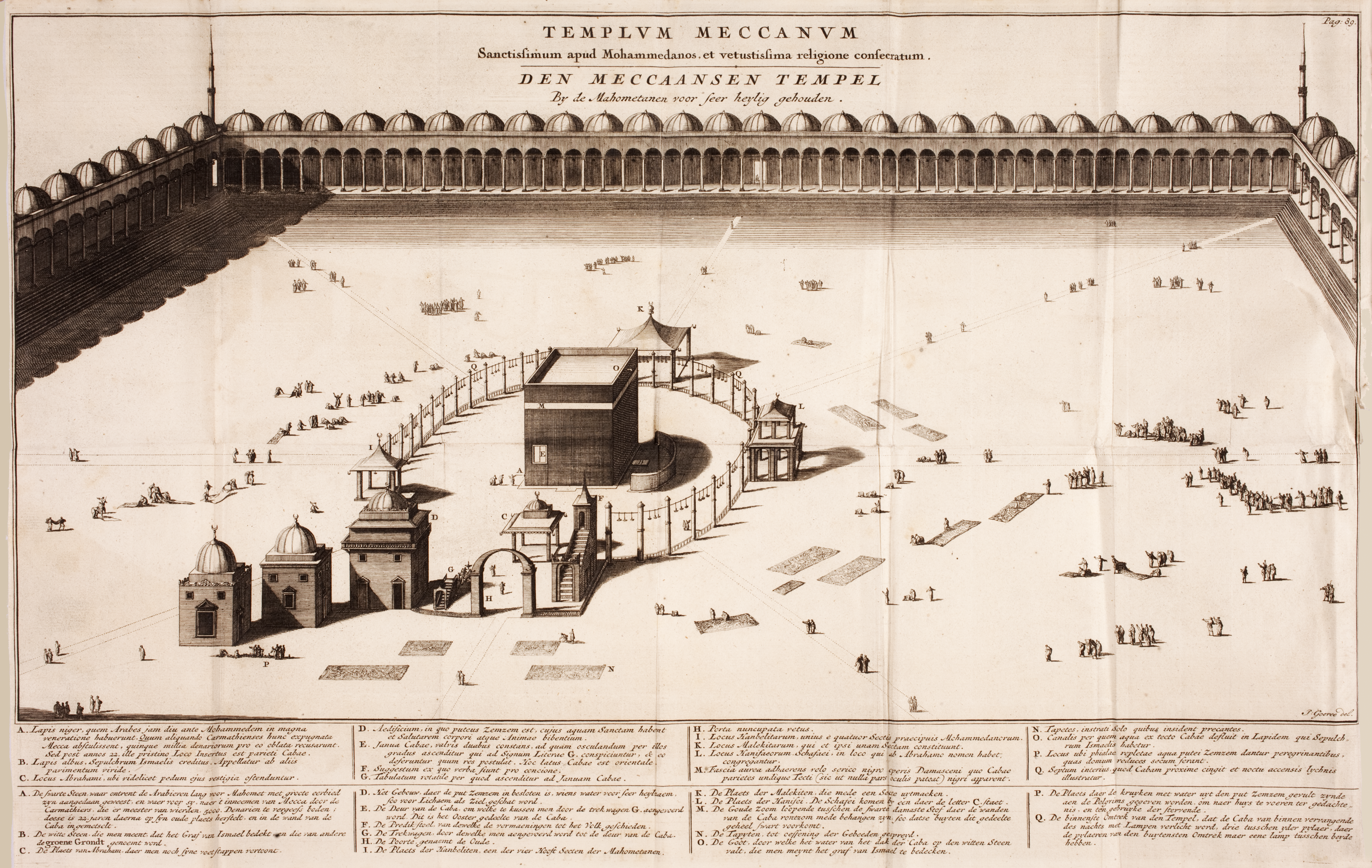
The domed building covering Zamzam which was destroyed in 1803 (D) and Zamzamis in front of the Domes of Drinking (P) c. 1718

Following the Abbasid relinquishment of the management of the well a quasi-guild called Zamzamis emerged and remained in place at least until the end of the 19th century. While theoretically anyone could go to the well and fill a vessel they brought at the well, in practice this group of specialised men ended up being primarily responsible for distributing the well's water. They did so by storing two kinds of filled jugs, some on wooden podiums with metal cups attached others hidden in the shade. They performed this service in theory without demanding payment. In 19th century practice however a pilgrim would be assigned a Zamzami upon his arrival and would have been obliged to pay him a small initial sum of $1 for a jug to bear his name. This jug would then be kept by the Zamzami for the pilgrim. Payment was in practice also expected for the further services of the Zamzami. These included bringing the pilgrim water throughout his pilgrimage and pouring it over his body for purposes of ritual cleaning (wuḍūʾ) among others. To nudge the pilgrim into donating adequately the Zamzami would show the pilgrim the bad state of the prayer mats he laid out in the Masjid for the pilgrims and explain his dire need for donations. The more generous the pilgrim's donations were, the more expansive the Zamzami's services became; with services such as procuring bottled Zamzam water to be taken home after the pilgrimage and bringing jugs right to the pilgrim's abode in Mecca being reserved for the most generous. To be allowed into the trade of being a Zamzami a costly license from the Grand Sharif was required. During the reign of Awn ar-Rafiq as Grand Sharif for example such a license cost £50.

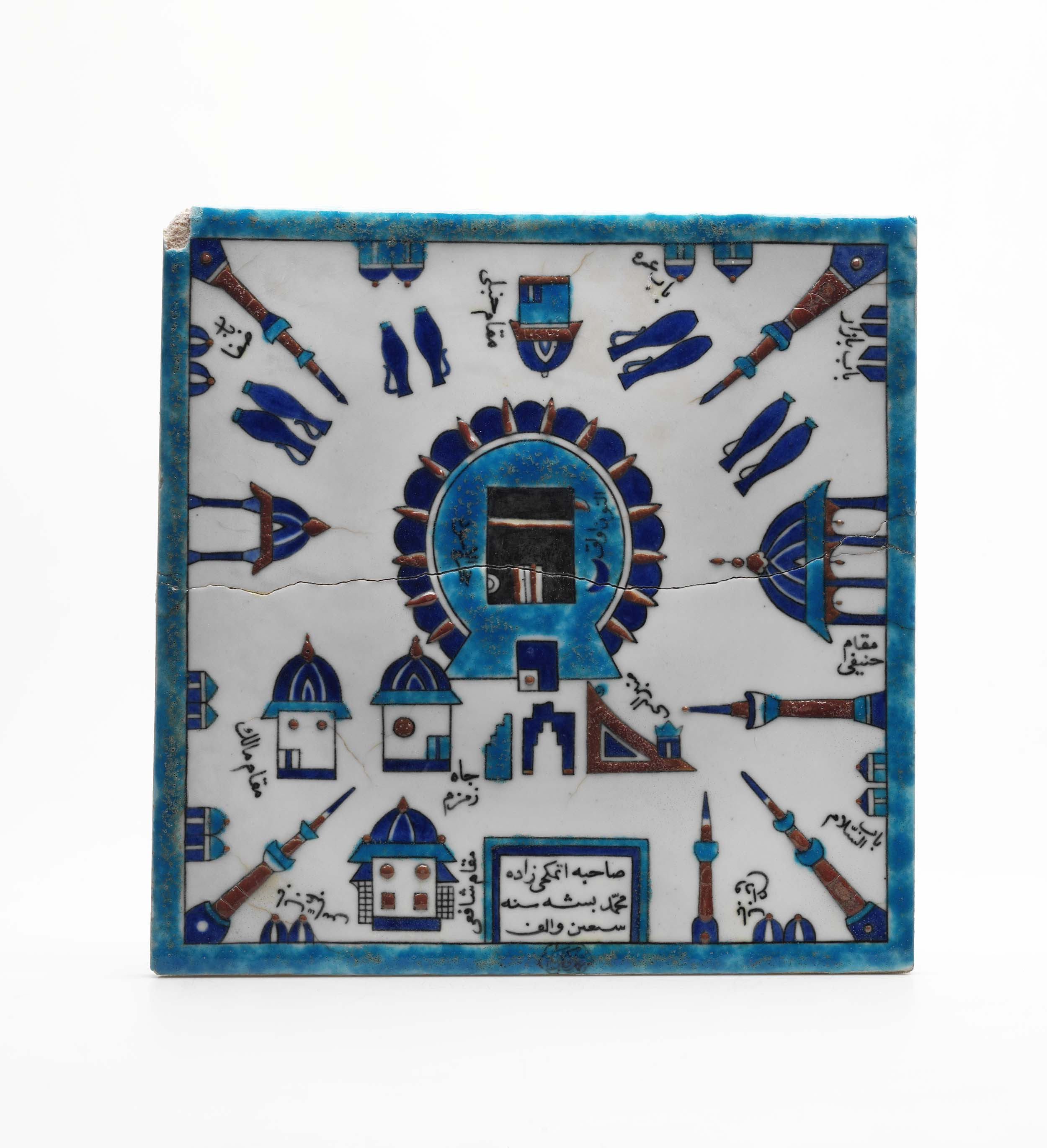
16th century depiction of the Domes of Drinking and the containers set up all over the masjid by the Zamzamis

In the 15th century the Mamluk Sultan Qaitbay invested into improving the well's water quality, as well as funding the construction of a new dome covering the well. In 1489, during the reign of Mamluk Sultan Malik an-Nāṣir, reconstruction of the Dome of Abbas, i.e. one of the two Domes of Drinking, occurred. There had been structures bearing this name and function again at least since 1183. The new structure featured a large painted gate made from yellow stone, a large fountain in its middle, three iron windows, and two metal fountains for pilgrims to drink from all housed under a large dome. Following the Ottoman conquest of the Mamluk Sultanate and their assumption of power in Mecca, Suleiman the Magnificent funded many construction and renovation works in the city. One of these began in 1540 with the destruction of the roof covering the well, which had remained intact since Qaitbay's rule. While construction was disrupted by a flood, completion of the new roof occurred in January 1542. In 1621 the Ottoman Sultan Ahmed I had an iron cage constructed around the well. In 1660 Ottoman authorities constructed a new building over Zamzam. Following their conquest of Mecca in 1803, during the reign of Selim III, the Wahhabis, led by Abdulaziz bin Muhammad Al Saud, destroyed the dome covering the well.

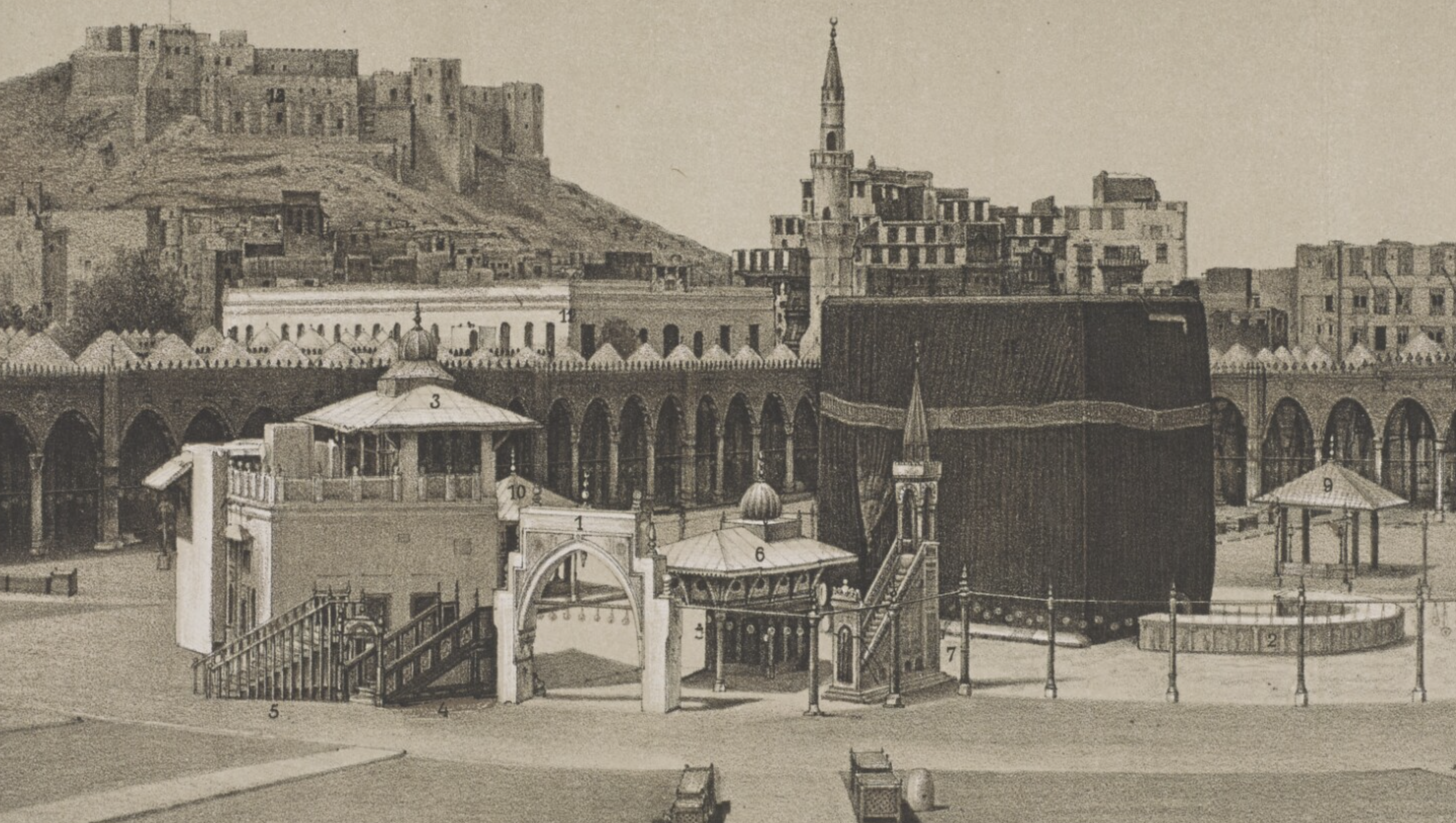
Building covering Zamzam (3) in 1888

In 1964 the last building covering the well of Zamzam, which had been rebuilt by Ottoman authorities following the destruction of the building housing Zamzam by the first Saudi State, was demolished by authorities of the third Saudi State (known at that time already as the Kingdom of Saudi Arabia). In its place the opening of the well was moved to a basement, 2.5 metres (8.2 ft) deep, to free up space above ground for pilgrims.

== Technical information ==
The well of Zamzam was expanded by hand over the years, and is about 30 m (100 ft) deep and 1.08 to 2.66 m (3 ft 7 in to 8 ft 9 in) in diameter. It taps groundwater from the Wadi Ibrahim alluvium and from bedrock.

Water formerly was drawn from the well with ropes and buckets; since 1964, the well itself opens into a basement room inaccessible to the public, where it can be seen behind glass panels. Two electric pumps, operating alternately, move the water 5 km (3.1 mi) southwards at a pace between 11 and 18.5 litres (2½ and 4½ gallons) per second to the King Abdullah bin Abdulaziz Zamzam Water Project in Kudai. The center opened in September 2010 and cost 700 million Saudi riyals to construct; it is operated by the National Water Company of Saudi Arabia. In this location the water is treated, using filters and ultraviolet light, stored, and distributed.

Once treated, the water is stored in one of two reservoirs: the first, located in Kudai, can hold 10,000 cubic meters (13,000 cu. yd.) of water; the other, King Abdulaziz Sabeel Reservoir in Medina, has a capacity of 16,000 cubic meters (20,000 cu. yd.). The Kudai reservoir is connected by pipes to drinking fountains in the Masjid al-Haram. The Medina reservoir supplies the Prophet's Mosque. Additionally, unbottled water is distributed using tanker trucks which transport 150,000 litres (35,000 gal.) per day at normal times and up to 400,000 litres per day (100,000 gal.) during pilgrimage seasons to the Medina location. Unbottled water is available through the before-mentioned drinking fountains, a fountain meant for pilgrims wishing to fill larger containers not intended for immediate consumption, and sterilised containers placed by authorities throughout the holy sites in Mecca and Medina. These latter containers come in several variants, chilled and unchilled, as well as being either stationary or worn as a backpack by employees of the complexes with disposable plastic cups provided in any case. Small filtered water bottles are also distributed free of charge at the holy sites. The water distributed this way in the Masjid al-Haram totals ca. 700,000 litres (175,000 gal.) per day outside of pilgrimage season and 2,000,000 litres (500,000 gal.) per day during said season. Distribution outside the Islamic holy sites within the Kingdom of Saudi Arabia occurs with the water being bottled in 10-litre (2½ gallon) containers which are sold directly at a warehouse at the site of the King Abdullah bin Abdulaziz Zamzam Water Project or via hypermarkets and super stores throughout the state. In 2018 the number of 10-litre (2½ gallon) containers distributed per day was 1.5 million. In 2010 the annual limit on how much water can be extracted from the well was stated as c. 500,000 cubic meters (700,000 cu. yd) per year, though due to annual variations in rainfall patterns there exists a lot of deviation with regards to how much water can be extracted without lowering the well's water level too drastically each year.

Hydrogeologically, the well is in the Wadi Ibrahim (Valley of Abraham). The upper half of the well is in the sandy alluvium of the valley, lined with stone masonry except for the top metre (3 ft) which has a concrete "collar". The lower half is in the bedrock. Between the alluvium and the bedrock is a 1/2-metre (1 ft 8 in) section of permeable weathered rock, lined with stone, and it is this section that provides the main water entry into the well. Water in the well comes from absorbed rainfall in the Wadi Ibrahim, as well as run-off from the local hills. Since the area has become more and more settled, water from absorbed rainfall on the Wadi Ibrahim has decreased.

The Saudi Geological Survey has a "Zamzam Studies and Research Centre" which analyses the technical properties of the well in detail. Water levels were monitored by hydrograph, which in more recent times has changed to a digital monitoring system that tracks the water level, electric conductivity, pH, Eh, and temperature. All of this information is made continuously available via the Internet. Other wells throughout the valley have also been established, some with digital recorders, to monitor the response of the local aquifer system.

Zamzam water is colourless and odorless, but has a distinctive taste, with a pH of 7.9–8, and so is slightly alkaline.

Mineral concentration as reported by researchers at King Saud University
mineral	concentration	
mineral	mg/L	oz/cu in
Sodium	133	7.7×10^{−5}
Calcium	96	5.5×10^{−5}
Magnesium	38.88	2.247×10^{−5}
Potassium	43.3	2.50×10^{−5}
Bicarbonate	195.4	0.0001129
Chloride	163.3	9.44×10^{−5}
Fluoride	0.72	4.2×10^{−7}
Nitrate	124.8	7.21×10^{−5}
Sulfate	124.0	7.17×10^{−5}
Total dissolved solids	835	0.000483

== Safety of Zamzam water ==
According to the SGS, the Zamzam Well is tested on a daily basis, in a process which involves the taking of three samples from the well. These samples are then examined at the King Abdullah Zamzam Water Distribution Center in Mecca, which is equipped with advanced facilities.

The Zamzam well was renovated in 2018 by the Saudi authorities. The project involved cleaning of the areas around the Zamzam well by removing the debris of concrete and steel used in the old cellar of the Grand Mosque. During Ramadan, 100 samples are tested every day to ensure the water's good quality.

=== Historical controversy ===
Cholera epidemics and the Hajj had become an issue of debate since an 1866 International Sanitary Conference in Istanbul. The conference however identified British steam-ships transporting Indian Muslims to the Hajj as mainly responsible for the globalisation of cholera. The Ottoman state consequently instituted a quarantine system using the Red Sea to protect public health. Britain tried to undermine this system in the coming decades fearing public backlash in India and restrictions on its ability to engage in free trade.

The first controversy surrounding the safety of water from the Zamzam Well began in 1883. In 1881, James Zohrab, British Consul in Jeddah sent samples of water, which he alleged to be Zamzam water, to Edward Frankland, who published his findings in 1883. Frankland claimed the water from the well to be six times more contaminated by animal waste than sewage in London. Arguing that due to human waste being simply buried in the ground in Mecca, the groundwater had become highly contaminated and a source of cholera. This situation, coupled with the city's visitors from all around the Muslim world, was thought to have spread the disease effectively throughout it. He ultimately called for the closure of Zamzam as a public health measure to protect the people of Asia and Europe.

Frankland's report became the basis for a treatise presented to the Ottoman Board of Health by the Dutch emissary thereto. The treatise was received very negatively and interpreted as anti-Islamic propaganda. Mehmed Şakir Bey, an epidemiologist, was so outraged that he consulted Bonkowski Paşa, the Sultan's head chemist, and Ahmet Efendi, professor of chemistry at the Ottoman War College, for further scientific inquiry. Their testing revealed nothing dangerous about the water of Zamzam. By comparing their results to the results Frankland had published they began to publicly doubt the authenticity of his sample, as his sample was almost as saline as sea water. Additionally they explained that the water in Mecca's aqueducts and that from Zamzam came from entirely different sources, that pilgrims did not so much as bathe near the Masjid al-Haram, and that Zamzam could not be a cholera source because Mecca did not see annual cholera epidemics during the Hajj.

Related to their doubts of the water's authenticity they began to speculate that Yusuf Kudzi, a British protected person and associate of Zohrab, had been the source of the water and had contaminated the water to embarrass the Muslim world. Kudzi was of Russian-Jewish ancestry, had been born in Jerusalem and was a convert to Islam. The Ottoman establishment of that time had grown to doubt the authenticity of any Muslim cooperating with the British, conceptualising them as not truly Muslim and possibly as being spies.

Britain's intellectuals ended up rejecting Robert Koch's (presently widely accepted) findings of cholera being caused by bacteria. They kept arguing that cholera must be caused by local factors and in a manner which cannot be mediated via quarantine. British scientists would continue publishing anti-Zamzam and anti-contagionist articles up to 1895. Their anti-contagionist views would fall further and further away from scientific consensus in the following decades. Concurrently Ottoman authorities continued to invest into persistent and successful efforts seeking to maintain and improve water quality throughout Arabia.

=== BBC allegation and responses ===
In May 2011, a BBC London investigation alleged that water taken from taps connected to the Zamzam Well contained high levels of nitrate and arsenic at levels three times the legal limit in the UK, the same levels found in illegal water purchased in the UK.

==== Saudi Arabian authorities' response ====
The Saudi authorities rejected the BBC's claim and said that the water is fit for human consumption. An official from the Saudi Arabian embassy in London stated 'water from the Zamzam well is not contaminated and is fit for human consumption. Genuine Zamzam water does not contain arsenic'. The president of the Saudi Geological Survey (SGS), Zuhair Nawab, has stated that the Zamzam Well is tested on a daily basis, in a process involving the taking of three samples from the well.

The BBC article concentrated on bottled water supplied by individuals rather than the Presidency of the Two Holy Mosques' Affairs, according to Fahd Turkistani, advisor to the General Authority of Meteorology and Environmental Protection. Turkistani stated that the Zamzam water pollution may have been caused by unsterilized containers used by illegal workers selling Zamzam water at Makkah gates.

==== Council of British Hajjis ====
In the same month that the BBC report was released, the Council of British Hajjis later declared that drinking Zamzam water was safe, contradicting the BBC report. The council noted that the Government of Saudi Arabia does not allow the export of Zamzam water for resale. They also stated that it was unknown whether the water being sold in the UK was genuine and that people should not buy it and should report the sellers to the Trading Standards if they saw it for sale.

== See also ==
- List of reduplicated place names
- Sacred waters
