= Hagar in Islam =

Islamic figure, cognate to the Biblical Hagar

هَاجَر Hājar
- Born: Egypt
- Died: Mecca
- Known for: Egyptian princess, being the slave of Sarai/Sarah Ibrahim (Abraham) and mother of Ismail (Ishmael).
- Spouse: ʾIbrāhīm (Abraham)
- Children: ʾIsmāʿīl

Hājar (Arabic: هَاجَر), known as Hagar in the Hebrew Bible, was the wife of the patriarch and Islamic prophet Ibrahim (Abraham) and the mother of Ismā'īl (Ishmael). She is a revered woman in the Islamic faith. According to Muslim belief, she was a maid of the king of Egypt who gifted her to Ibrahim's wife Sarah. Although not mentioned by name in the Qur'an, she is referenced and alluded to via the story of her husband. She eventually settled in the Desert of Paran, seen as the Hejaz in the Islamic view, with her son Ishmael. Hajar is honoured as an especially important matriarch of monotheism, as Ishmael was the ancestor of Muhammad.

== Narrative ==
Abraham was childless. He was a prophet of Allah and, having left his native land, he was concerned about who would take the prophetic office after him, and whether he would be a father one day. His wife's servant Hājar, who was gifted to her, was given to Abraham as a wife to bear a child. According to modern scholars, Hājar was not a concubine, but rather a princess, the daughter of the king of Egypt. Hājar subsequently bore a child who would grow to be righteous and ready to suffer and endure. Hājar named him Ismā'īl, meaning "God has heard".

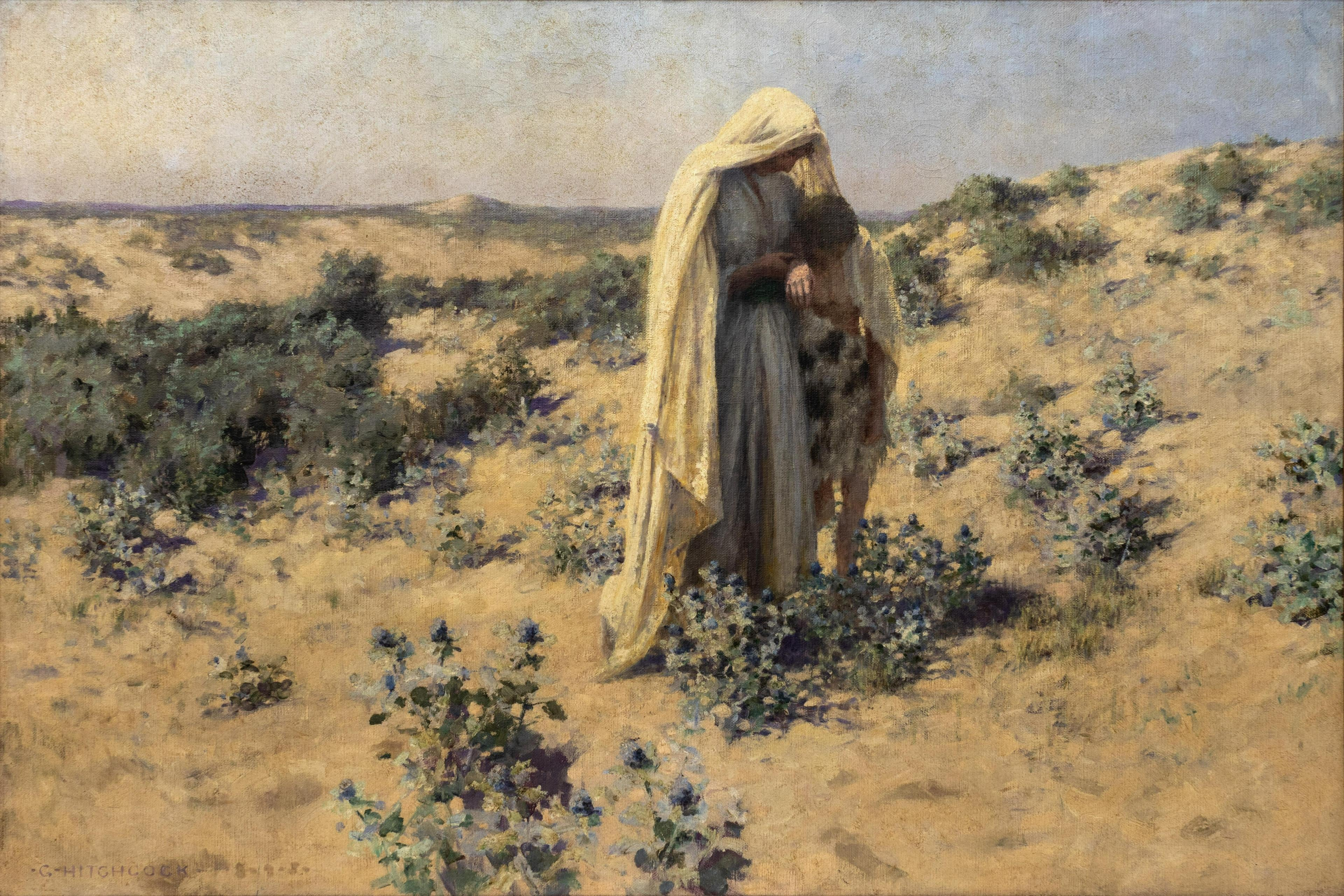
Hagar and Ishmael in the Desert (George Hitchcock)

Islamic scholar Muhammad Saed Abdul-Rahman states the following using the Arabic name Haajar for Haajara; Allah revealed to Ibrahim that he should take Haajar and the infant Ismaa’eel and take them to Makkah. So he took them and left Haajar and her child Ismaa’eel in a bleak, isolated place in which there was no water, then he left them and went back to Canaan. Haajar said to him, 'For whom are you leaving us in this forsaken valley?' But Ibrahim went and left her, and she said, 'Has Allah commanded you to do this?” He said, 'Yes.' She said, 'Then Allah will not cause us to be lost.'"

Abraham submitted to the command of his Lord and patiently bore the separation from his wife and child. The Qur'an contains several verses regarding the origin of the Sacred House, known as the Kaaba, in which Haajara and her son lived. It states that the Kaaba was the first House of Worship for mankind, and that it was rebuilt by Ibrahim and Ismail on Allah's instruction. A few years after he first left, Ibrahim returned and turned towards where they were at the Sacred House and prayed for them in the following words (interpretation of the meaning): 'O our Lord! I have made some of my offspring to dwell in an uncultivatable valley by Your Sacred House (the Kaaba ('Cube') at Mecca) in order, O our Lord, that they may perform As-Ṣalāt. So fill some hearts among men with love towards them, and (O Allah) provide them with fruits so that they may give thanks' Qur'an, Ibraaheem 14:37

Because of the scarcity of water in the desert, it was not long before both mother and son suffered immense thirst. Thus, Haajara ran between the Safa and Marwa hills in search of water for her son. After the seventh run between the two hills, the angel Jibril (Gabriel) appeared before her. He told her that God had heard Ishmael's crying and would provide them with water. At that moment, God caused a spring to burst forth from the ground under Ishmael's heel, and thereafter Mecca became known for its excellence and abundance of water. The well was subsequently named Zamzam, and became a holy source of water.

== Status ==
Hajara is presented as a bondswoman in the Bible and some Islamic sources. Pakistani scholar Muhammad Ashraf Chheenah attributes the claim to Christian and Jewish sources and identifies her as the daughter of an Egyptian king who gifted her to Abraham.

== Legacy ==
Hagar is honoured by Muslims as a wise, brave and pious woman as well as the believing mother of the Adnani Arab people. The incident of her running between Al-Safa and Al-Marwah hills is commemorated by Muslims when they perform their Ḥajj (major pilgrimage) or Umrah (minor pilgrimage) at Mecca. Part of the pilgrimage is to run seven times between the hills, in commemoration of Hagar's courage and faith in God as she searched for water in the desert (which is believed to have then miraculously appeared from the Zamzam Well) and to symbolize the celebration of motherhood in Islam. To complete the task, some Muslims also drink from the Zamzam Well and take some of it back to their homes.
