= Chayei Sarah =

5th weekly Torah portion in the annual Jewish cycle of Torah reading

Chayei Sarah, Chaye Sarah, Ḥayye Sarah, or Ḥayyei Sara (חַיֵּי שָׂרָה—Hebrew for "life of Sarah," the first words in the parashah), is the fifth weekly Torah portion (פָּרָשָׁה, parashah) in the annual Jewish cycle of Torah reading. It constitutes Genesis 23:1–25:18. The parashah tells the stories of Abraham's negotiations to purchase a burial place for his wife Sarah and his servant's mission to find a wife for Abraham's son Isaac.

The parashah is made up of 5,314 Hebrew letters, 1,402 Hebrew words, 105 verses, and 171 lines in a Torah Scroll (סֵפֶר תּוֹרָה, Sefer Torah). Jews read it on the fifth Sabbath after Simchat Torah, generally in November, or on rare occasion in late October.

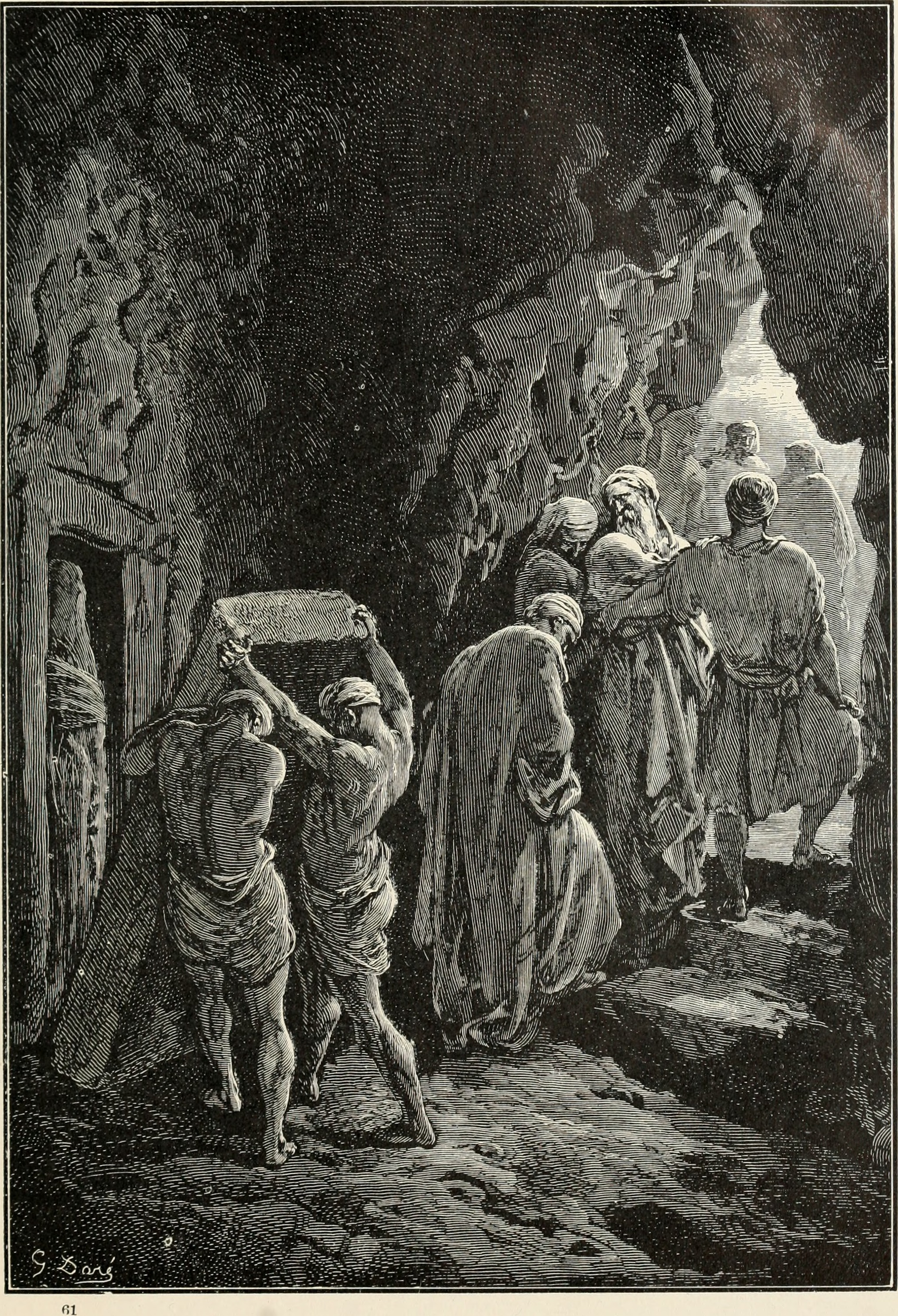
Burial of Sarah (engraving by Gustave Doré from the 1865 La Sainte Bible)

== Readings ==
In traditional Sabbath Torah reading, the parashah is divided into seven readings, or עליות, aliyot. In the Masoretic Text of the Hebrew Bible, Parashat Chayei Sarah has three "open portion" (פתוחה, petuchah) divisions (roughly equivalent to paragraphs, often abbreviated with the Hebrew letter פ (peh)). Parashat Chayei Sarah has one "closed portion" (סתומה, setumah) division (abbreviated with the Hebrew letter ס (samekh)) within the "open portion" division of the second reading. The long first open portion spans the first five readings. The second open portion coincides with the sixth reading. The third open portion coincides with the seventh reading.

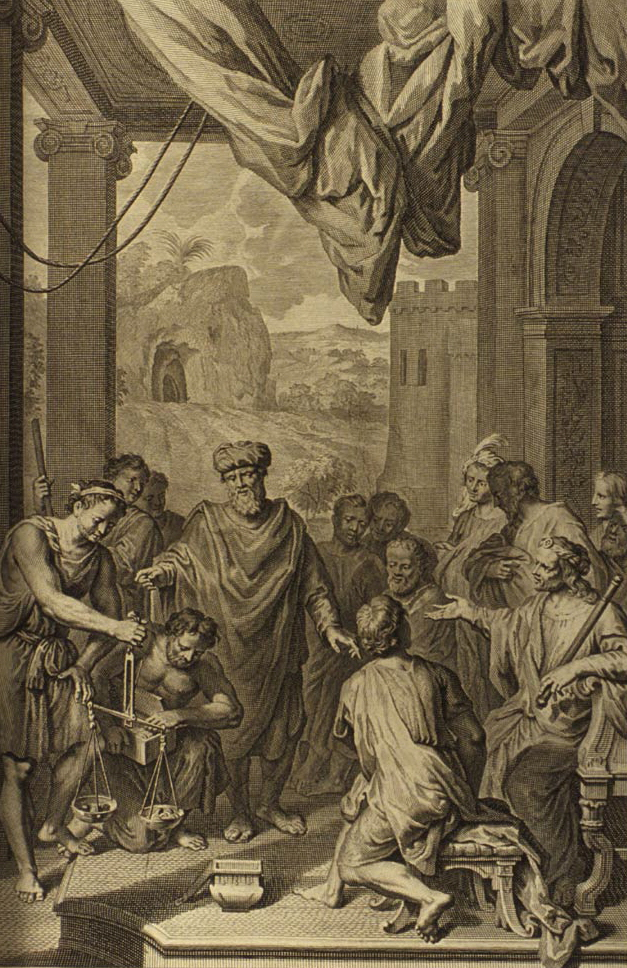
Abraham Weighs Silver (illustration from the 1728 Figures de la Bible)

=== First reading—Genesis 23:1–16 ===
In the first reading, Sarah lived 127 years and died in Hebron, and Abraham mourned for her. Abraham asked the Hittites to sell him a burial site, and the Hittites invited him to bury his dead in the choicest of their burial places. Abraham asked the Hittites to intercede for him with Ephron, son of Zohar, to sell Abraham the cave of Machpelah at full price. Before the Hittites at the town gate, Ephron offered to give Abraham the field and the cave that was in it, but Abraham insisted on paying the price of the land. Ephron named the value of the land at 400 shekels of silver, and Abraham accepted Ephron's terms, gave him the silver, and purchased the land. The first reading ends here.

=== Second reading—Genesis 23:17–24:9 ===
In the second reading, Abraham thus established his title to the land through purchase, and he buried Sarah in the cave. Abraham was old and instructed his senior servant to put his hand under Abraham's thigh and swear by God that he would not take a wife for Isaac from the Canaanites, but would go to the land of Abraham's birth to get Isaac a wife. The servant asked if the woman did not consent to follow him to Canaan, should he take Isaac back to the land from which Abraham came? Abraham told him on no account to take Isaac back there, for God—who took Abraham from there and promised Abraham the land of Canaan for his offspring—would send an angel before the servant and allow him successfully to get a wife for Isaac from there, and if the woman did not consent to follow him, he would then be clear of his oath. So the servant put his hand under Abraham's thigh and swore to him as Abraham had asked. The second reading ends here.

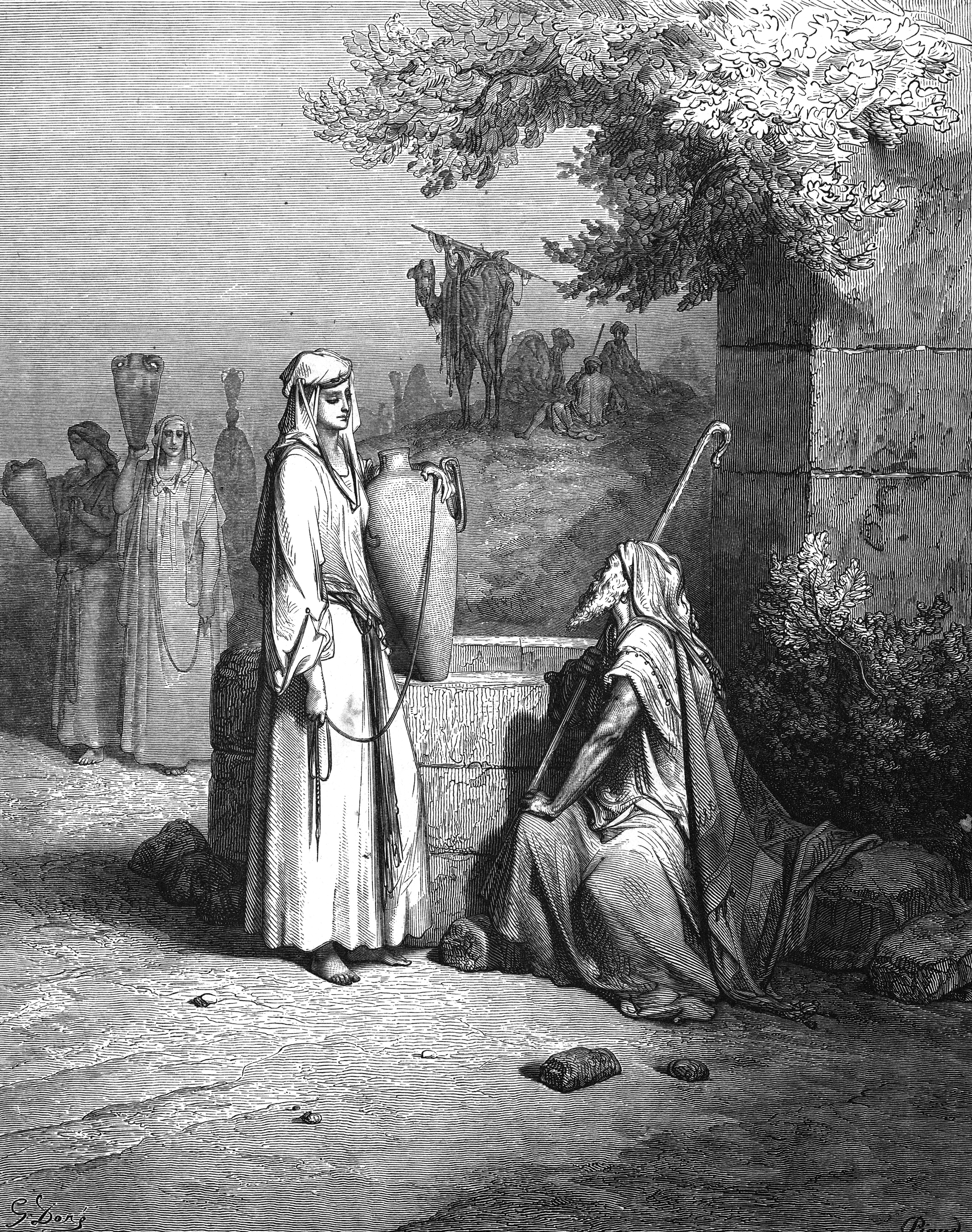
Eliezer and Rebekah (engraving by Gustave Doré from the 1865 La Sainte Bible)

=== Third reading—Genesis 24:10–26 ===
In the third reading, the servant took Abraham's bounty and ten of Abraham's camels and traveled to Aram-Naharaim, the city of Nahor. He made the camels kneel by the well outside the city at evening, when women come out to draw water. The servant asked God to grant that the maiden whom he would ask to draw water for him and who replied by also offering to water his camels might be the one whom God had decreed for Isaac. He had scarcely finished speaking when Rebekah, the beautiful virgin daughter of Abraham's nephew Bethuel, came out with her jar on her shoulder, went down to the spring, filled her jar, and came up. The servant ran toward her and asked to sip a little water from her jar, and she quickly let him drink, and when he had drunk his fill, she offered to draw water for his camels until they finished drinking. When the camels had finished drinking, the servant took a gold nose ring and two gold bands for her arms and asked her whose daughter she was and whether there was room in her father's house for him to spend the night. She identified herself and told him that there was plenty of straw and feed and room at her home for him to spend the night. The servant bowed low to God. The third reading ends here.

Terah
Hagar	Abraham	Sarah	Haran
Nahor	Milcah	Iscah	Lot
Bethuel	Moab	Ben-ammi
Ishmael	Isaac	Rebekah	Laban

=== Fourth reading—Genesis 24:27–52 ===
In the fourth reading, the servant blessed God for steadfast faithfulness to Abraham. Rebekah ran and told everything to her mother's household. Rebekah's brother Laban ran out to the servant at the spring, and when he saw the nose-ring and the bands on Rebekah's arms, and when he heard his sister tell the story, Laban invited the servant to their house, had the camels unloaded and fed, and had water brought to bathe the feet of the servant and his party. But the servant would not eat before he had told his tale. The servant told how God had greatly blessed Abraham with sheep and cattle, silver and gold, male and female slaves, camels and asses, and a son and sole heir. The servant told how Abraham made him swear to go to Abraham's kindred to get Isaac a wife and that God would send an angel to make his errand successful. And the servant told how he met Rebekah at the well. The servant then asked whether or not they meant to treat Abraham with true kindness, and Laban and Bethuel answered that God had decreed the matter and Rebekah could go and be Isaac's wife. The servant bowed low to God. The fourth reading ends here.

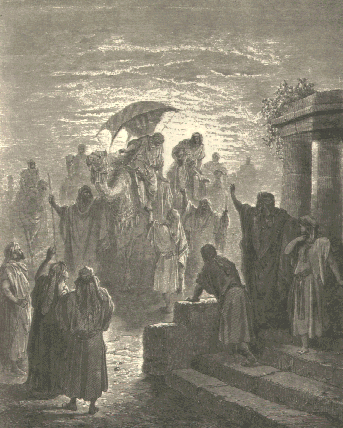
Meeting of Isaac and Rebekah (engraving by Gustave Doré from the 1865 La Sainte Bible)

=== Fifth reading—Genesis 24:53–67 ===
In the fifth reading, the servant brought out silver, gold, and garments for Rebekah and presents for her brother and her mother. Then the servant and his party ate, drank, and spent the night. The following day, the servant asked to leave to return to Abraham, but Laban and her mother requested that Rebekah remain for a period of time. The servant persisted, so they called Rebekah to ask her, and she agreed to go. So they blessed Rebekah—wishing that her children be thousands of myriads and seize the gates of their foes—and they sent off Rebekah and her nurse with the servant. Isaac had just come back from the vicinity of Beer-lahai-roi to his home in the Negeb and was out walking in the field toward evening when he looked up and saw camels approaching. Raising her eyes, Rebekah saw Isaac, alighted from the camel, and asked the servant who the man was. The servant said that Isaac was his master, so she covered herself with her veil. The servant told Isaac everything that had happened, and Isaac brought her into Sarah's tent and took her as his wife. Isaac loved Rebekah and found comfort after his mother's death. The fifth reading and the long first open portion end here with the end of chapter 24.

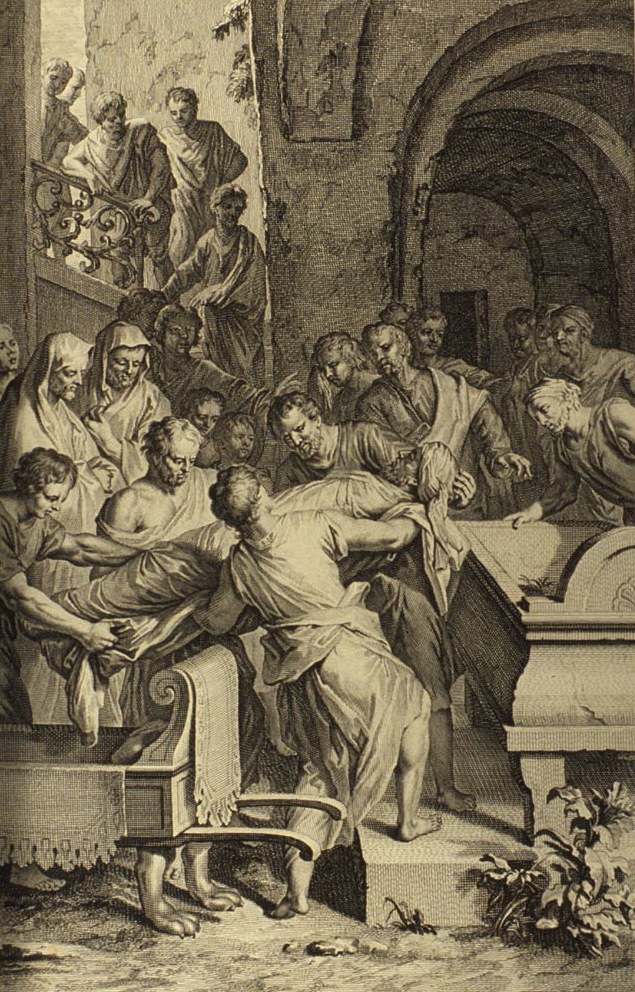
Isaac and Ishmael Bury Abraham (illustration from the 1728 Figures de la Bible)

=== Sixth reading—Genesis 25:1–11 ===
In the sixth reading, in chapter 25, Abraham took another wife, named Keturah, who bore him Zimran, Jokshan, Medan, Midian, Ishbak, and Shuah. Abraham willed all that he owned to Isaac, but to his sons, by concubines, he gave gifts while he was still living, and he sent them away from his son Isaac to the land of the East. Abraham lived 175 years and died old and contented. Isaac and Ishmael buried him in the cave of Machpelah with Sarah. After Abraham's death, God blessed Isaac and he settled near Beer-lahai-roi. The sixth reading and the second open portion end here.

=== Seventh reading—Genesis 25:12–18 ===
In the seventh reading, Ishmael had 12 sons, who became chieftains of 12 tribes. In the maftir (מפטיר) reading that concludes the parashah, Ishmael lived 137 years and then died. Ishmael's progeny dwelt in lands all the way from Havilah, near Egypt, to Asshur. The seventh reading, the third open portion, and the parashah end here.

=== Readings according to the triennial cycle ===
Jews who read the Torah according to the triennial cycle of Torah reading read the parashah according to the following schedule:

	Year 1	Year 2	Year 3
	2022, 2025, 2028 . . .	2023, 2026, 2029 . . .	2024, 2027, 2030 . . .
Reading	23:1–24:9	24:10–52	24:53–25:18
1	23:1–4	24:10–14	24:53–58
2	23:5–7	24:15–20	24:59–61
3	23:8–12	24:21–26	24:62–67
4	23:13–16	24:27–33	25:1–6
5	23:17–20	24:34–41	25:7–11
6	24:1–4	24:42–49	25:12–15
7	24:5–9	24:50–52	25:16–18
Maftir	24:5–9	24:50–52	25:16–18

== In inner-Biblical interpretation ==
The parashah has parallels or is discussed in these Biblical sources:

=== Genesis chapter 23 ===
Kiriath-arba, mentioned in Genesis 23:2, literally means “village of Arba.” Joshua 14:15 explains that Arba was the great man among the Anakites. Similarly, Joshua 15:13 reports that Arba was the father of Anak, and Joshua 21:11 tells that Arba was the father of the Anokites.

The 400 shekels of silver that Abraham paid Ephron the Hittite to buy the cave of Machpelah and adjoining land in Genesis 23:14–16 far exceeds the 100 pieces of silver that Jacob paid the children of Hamor for the parcel of ground where he had spread his tent outside the city of Shechem in Genesis 33:18–19; the 50 shekels of silver that King David paid Araunah the Jebusite for Araunah's threshing floor, oxen, and wood in 2 Samuel 24:18–24 (but 1 Chronicles 21:24 reports cost 600 shekels of gold); and the 17 shekels of silver that Jeremiah paid his cousin Hanamel for his field in Anathoth in the land of Benjamin in Jeremiah 32:7–9.

The cave of Machpelah in which Genesis 23:18 reports Abraham buried Sarah later became the burial site for Abraham himself (as reported in Genesis 25:8–10) and thereafter Isaac, Rebekah, Leah, and Jacob (as reported in Genesis 49:29–31).

=== Genesis chapter 24 ===
The story of Abraham's servant's mission to get a wife for Isaac is told twice, once by the narrator in Genesis 24:1–27, and then a second time by Abraham's servant in Genesis 24:34–48. Isaac Abrabanel and other commentators noted a number of differences between the two recountings.

Genesis 24:1–27 As Told by the Narrator	Genesis 24:34–48 As Told by Abraham's Servant
^{1} And Abraham was old, well stricken in age; and the Lord had blessed Abraham in all things.	^{35} And the Lord has blessed my master greatly; and he is become great; and He has given him flocks and herds, and silver and gold, and men-servants and maid-servants, and camels and asses.^{36} And Sarah my master's wife bore a son to my master when she was old; and to him has he given all that he has.
^{2} And Abraham said to his servant, the elder of his house, that ruled over all that he had: "Put, I pray you, your hand under my thigh.	^{34} And he said: "I am Abraham's servant.
^{3} And I will make you swear by the Lord, the God of heaven and the God of the earth, that you shall not take a wife for my son of the daughters of the Canaanites, among whom I dwell.	^{37} And my master made me swear, saying: You shall not take a wife for my son of the daughters of the Canaanites, in whose land I dwell.
^{4} But you shall go to my country, and to my kindred, and take a wife for my son, even for Isaac."	^{38} But you shall go to my father's house, and to my kindred, and take a wife for my son.
^{5} And the servant said to him: "Perhaps the woman will not be willing to follow me to this land; must I bring your son back to the land from which you came?"	^{39} And I said to my master: ‘Perhaps the woman will not follow me.'
^{6} And Abraham said to him: "Beware you that you do not bring my son back there.	
^{7} The Lord, the God of heaven, who took me from my father's house, and from the land of my nativity, and who spoke to me, and who swore to me, saying: ‘To your seed will I give this land'; He will send His angel before you, and you shall take a wife for my son from there.	^{40} And he said to me: The Lord, before whom I walk, will send His angel with you, and prosper your way; and you shall take a wife for my son of my kindred, and of my father's house;
^{8} And if the woman is not willing to follow you, then you shall be clear from my oath; only you shall not bring my son back there."	^{41} then shall you be clear from my oath, when you come to my kindred; and if they do not give her to you, you shall be clear from my oath.
^{9} And the servant put his hand under the thigh of Abraham his master, and swore to him concerning this matter.	
^{10} And the servant took ten camels, of the camels of his master, and departed; having all good things of his master's in his hand; and he arose, and went to Aram-Naharaim, to the city of Nahor.	
^{11} And he made the camels to kneel down without the city by the well of water at the time of evening, the time that women go out to draw water.^{12} And he said: "O Lord, the God of my master Abraham, send me, I pray, good speed this day, and show kindness to my master Abraham.	^{42} And I came this day to the fountain, and said: ‘O Lord, the God of my master Abraham, if now You do prosper my way that I go:
^{13} Behold, I stand by the fountain of water; and the daughters of the men of the city come out to draw water^{14} So let it come to pass, that the maiden to whom I shall say: ‘Let down your pitcher, I pray, that I may drink'; and she shall say: ‘Drink, and I will give your camels drink also'; let her be the one whom You have appointed for Your servant, even for Isaac; and thereby shall I know that You have shown kindness to my master."	^{43} behold, I stand by the fountain of water; and let it come to pass, that the maiden that comes forth to draw, to whom I shall say: ‘Give me, I pray, a little water from your pitcher to drink';^{44} and she shall say to me: ‘Both you drink, and I will also draw for your camels'; let her be the woman whom the Lord has appointed for my master's son.
^{15} And it came to pass, before he had done speaking, that, behold, Rebekah came out, who was born to Bethuel the son of Milcah, the wife of Nahor, Abraham's brother, with her pitcher upon her shoulder.^{16} And the maiden was very fair to look upon, a virgin, neither had any man known her; and she went down to the fountain, and filled her pitcher, and came up. ^{17} And the servant ran to meet her, and said: "Give me to drink, I pray, a little water of your pitcher."	^{45} And before I had done speaking to my heart, behold, Rebekah came forth with her pitcher on her shoulder; and she went down to the fountain, and drew. And I said to her: ‘Let me drink, I pray.'
^{18} And she said: "Drink, my lord"; and she hastened, and let down her pitcher upon her hand, and gave him drink.^{19} And when she had done giving him drink, she said: "I will draw for your camels also, until they have done drinking." ^{20} And she hastened, and emptied her pitcher into the trough, and ran again to the well to draw, and drew for all his camels.	^{46} And she made haste, and let down her pitcher from her shoulder, and said: ‘Drink, and I will give your camels drink also.' So I drank, and she made the camels drink also.
^{21} And the man looked steadfastly on her; holding his peace, to know whether the Lord had made his journey prosperous or not.	
^{22} And it came to pass, as the camels had done drinking, that the man took a golden ring of half a shekel weight, and two bracelets for her hands of ten shekels weight of gold;^{23} and said: "Whose daughter are you? tell me, I pray. Is there room in your father's house for us to lodge in?" ^{24} And she said to him: "I am the daughter of Bethuel the son of Milcah, whom she bore to Nahor."	^{47} And I asked her, and said: ‘Whose daughter are you?' And she said: ‘The daughter of Bethuel, Nahor's son, whom Milcah bore to him.' And I put the ring upon her nose, and the bracelets upon her hands.
^{25} She said moreover to him: "We have both straw and provender enough, and room to lodge in."	
^{26} And the man bowed his head, and prostrated himself before the Lord.^{27} And he said: "Blessed be the Lord, the God of my master Abraham, who has not forsaken His mercy and His truth toward my master; as for me, the Lord has led me to the house of my master's brethren.'	^{48} And I bowed my head, and prostrated myself before the Lord, and blessed the Lord, the God of my master Abraham, who had led me in the right way to take my master's brother's daughter for his son.

Abraham's servant's meeting (on behalf of Isaac) with Rebekah at the well in Genesis 24:11–27 is the Torah's first of several meetings at watering holes that lead to marriage. Also of the same type scene are the meeting of Jacob and Rachel at the well in Genesis 29:1–12 and the meeting of Moses and Zipporah at the well in Exodus 2:15–21. Each involves (1) a trip to a distant land, (2) a stop at a well, (3) a young woman coming to the well to draw water, (4) a heroic drawing of water, (5) the young woman going home to report to her family, (6) the visiting man brought to the family, and (7) a subsequent marriage.

== In early nonrabbinic interpretation ==
The parashah has parallels or is discussed in these early nonrabbinic sources:

=== Genesis chapter 23 ===
The Book of Jubilees reported that Abraham endured ten trials and was found faithful and patient in spirit. Jubilees listed eight of the trials: (1) leaving his country, (2) the famine, (3) the wealth of kings, (4) his wife taken from him, (5) circumcision, (6) Hagar and Ishmael driven away, (7) the binding of Isaac, and (8) buying the land to bury Sarah.

=== Genesis chapter 24 ===
Josephus reported that Rebekah told Abraham's servant, "my father was Bethuel, but he is dead; and Laban is my brother; and, together with my mother, takes care of all our family affairs, and is the guardian of my virginity."

== In classical rabbinic interpretation ==
The parashah is discussed in these rabbinic sources from the era of the Mishnah and the Talmud:

=== Genesis chapter 23 ===
A midrash noted that Genesis 23:1 recorded that "the life of Sarah was a hundred and seven and twenty years" rather than "one-hundred-twenty-seven years," and deduced that as the righteous are whole and unblemished by sin, so are their years reported whole in the Bible. Thus the midrash taught that at the age of 20, Sarah was as at the age of 7 in beauty, and at the age of 100, she was as at the age of 20 in sin (the age below which Providence does not punish for sin).

Rabbi Haggai said in Rabbi Isaac's name that all of the Matriarchs were prophets.

Rabbi Abba bar Kahana interpreted the words, "The sun rises, and the sun sets," in Ecclesiastes 1:5 to teach that before God causes the sun of one righteous person to set, God causes the sun of another righteous person to rise. Thus, a midrash taught that before God allowed Sarah's sun to set, God caused Rebekah's sun to rise. Thus Genesis 22:20–23 first says, "Behold, Milcah, she also has borne children . . . and Bethuel begot Rebekah," and after that, Genesis 23:1 says, "and the lifetime of Sarah was a hundred years . . . ."

Once while lecturing, Rabbi Akiva asked why Esther deserved to reign over 127 provinces (as indicated by Esther 1:1). Rabbi Akiva taught that the reason was this: Let Esther, the descendant of Sarah, who lived 127 years (as Genesis 23:1 reports), come and reign over 127 provinces.

Noting that Genesis 23:2 reports that "Sarah died in Kiriat-arba," literally, "city of four," a midrash taught that the city had four names—Eshcol, Mamre, Kiriat-arba, and Hebron. midrash taught that it was called Kiriat-arba because four righteous men dwelt there—Aner, Eshcol, Mamre, and Abraham; four righteous men were circumcised there—Abraham, Aner, Eshcol, and Mamre; four righteous men were buried there—Adam, Abraham, Isaac, and Jacob; and four matriarchs were buried there—Eve, Sarah, Rebekah, and Leah.

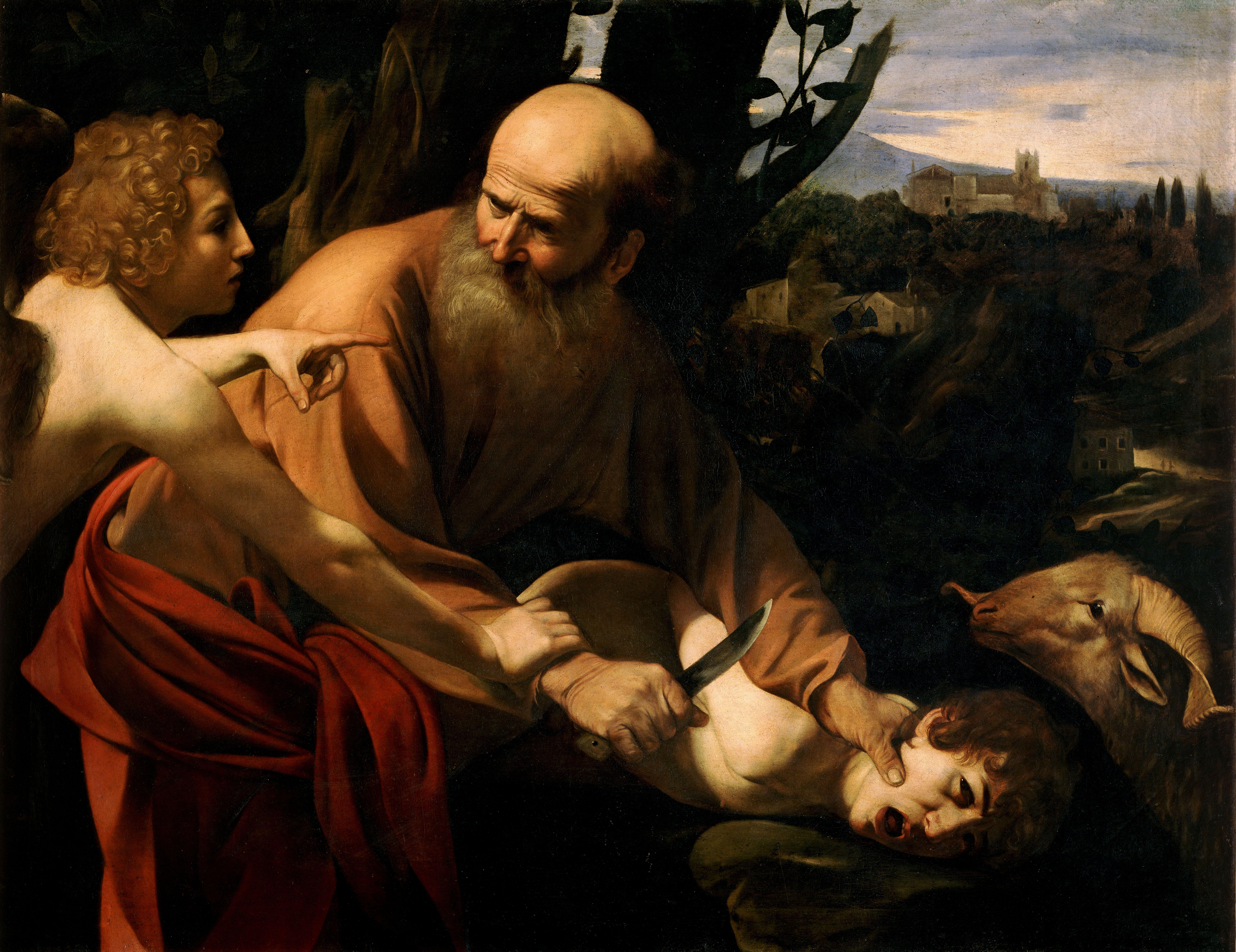
The Sacrifice of Isaac (painting circa 1590–1610 by Caravaggio)

A midrash deduced from the words "Abraham came to mourn for Sarah, and to weep for her" in Genesis 23:2 that Abraham came directly from Mount Moriah and the binding of Isaac. The midrash told that at the very moment in Genesis 22:11–12 that the angel of the Lord stayed Abraham from sacrificing Isaac, the Satan appeared to Sarah in the guise of Isaac. When Sarah saw him, she asked what Abraham had done to him. He told Sarah that Abraham had taken him to a mountain, built an altar, placed wood upon it, tied him down on it, and took a knife to slaughter him, and had God not told him not to lay a hand on him, Abraham would have slaughtered him. As soon as he finished speaking, Sarah's soul departed. Similarly, reading Genesis 23:2, "And Abraham came to mourn for Sarah," the Pirke De-Rabbi Eliezer reported that Abraham came from Mount Moriah to find that Sarah had died. When Abraham set out from Mount Moriah in peace, the anger of Sammael (the Satan) was kindled, for he saw that his desire to frustrate Abraham's offering had not been realized. So Sammael told Sarah that Abraham had killed Isaac and offered him as a burnt offering upon the altar. Sarah began to weep and to cry aloud three times, corresponding to the three sustained notes (of the shofar), and she gave forth three howlings corresponding to the three disconnected short notes (of the shofar), and her soul fled, and she died.

The Gemara deduced from the use of the verb "came" in the account of Genesis 23:2, "And Abraham came to mourn for Sarah and to weep for her," that Abraham delayed Sarah's funeral until he could travel to where her body lay. The Gemara further taught that Sarah would have been pleased that Abraham delayed her funeral so that he could eulogize her.

Rav Ashi deduced from Genesis 23:3 that as long as a person has the obligation to bury a body, it is as if the corpse lay before the person. Genesis 23:3 says: "And Abraham rose up from before his dead," indicating that he departed from the presence of Sarah's body. And then Genesis 23:4 says: "that I may bury my dead out of my sight," showing that Abraham still spoke as if Sarah's corpse were lying before him. (And this status affects a person's obligation to perform other commandments.) Similarly, Rabbi Joḥanan taught that we learn from the words, "And Abraham rose up from before his dead and spoke," in Genesis 23:3 that one whose dead lies before him is exempt from reciting the Shema (as the verse implies that until Sarah's burial, Abraham did nothing but make arrangements for it).

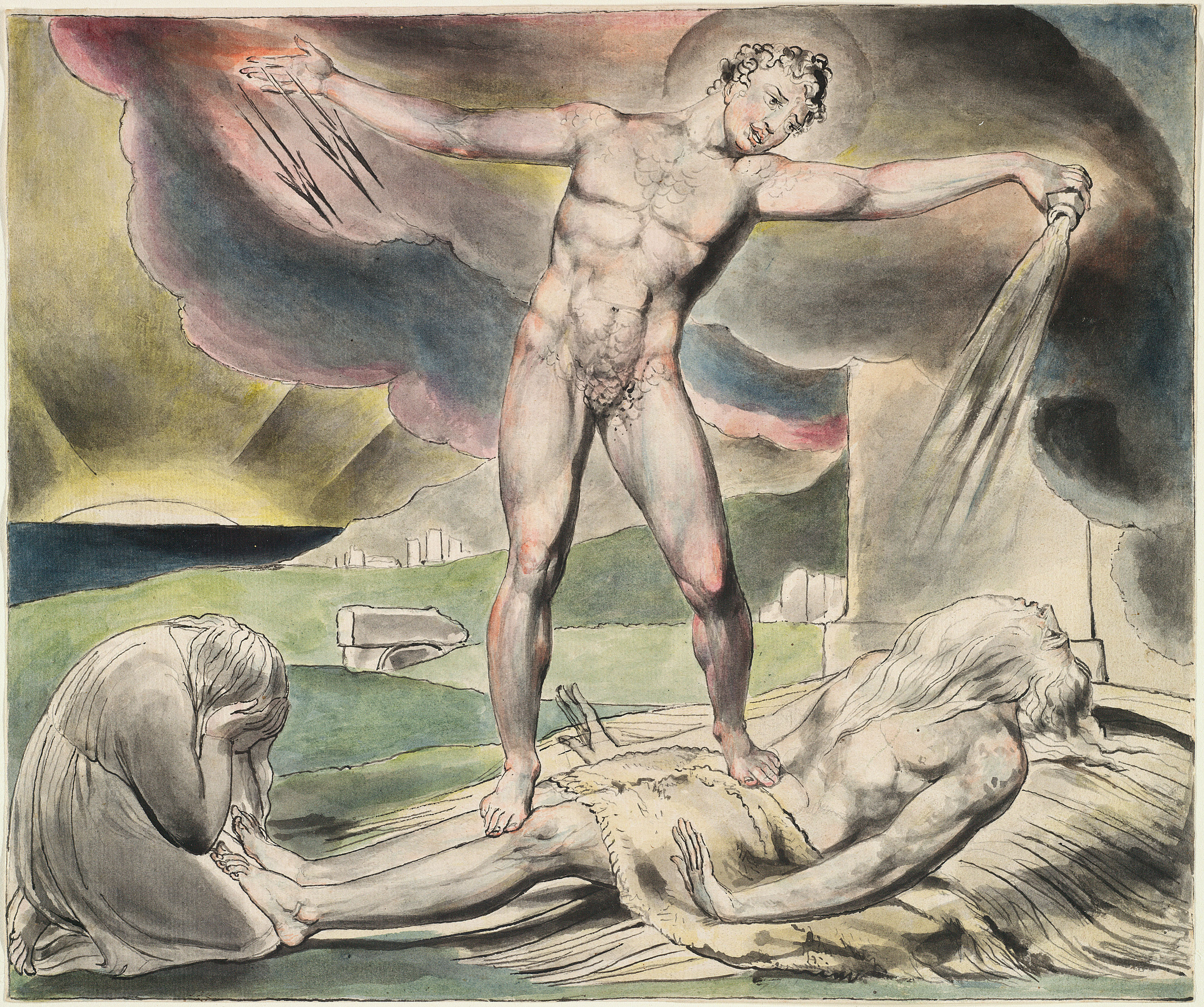
Satan Inflicting Plagues on Job (watercolor by William Blake from his 1826 Illustrations of the Book of Job)

The Gemara expanded on the conversation between God and Satan in Job 1:6–8 to teach that Abraham's patience in receiving the Promised Land even in the face of the need to buy land to bury his wife in Genesis 23:3–16 showed faith comparable to that of Job. Job 1:6–7 begins: "Now one day the sons of God came to present themselves before the Lord, and Satan came among them. And the Lord said to Satan: 'From where do you come?' Then Satan answered. . . ." The Gemara taught that Satan then told God: "Sovereign of the Universe, I have traversed the whole world and found none so faithful as Your servant Abraham. For You said to him, ‘Arise, walk through the land in the length of it and in the breadth of it; for to you will I give it,' and even so, when he was unable to find any place in which to bury Sarah until he bought one for 400 shekels of silver, he did not complain against Your ways." Only then did God say to Satan the words of Job 1:8, "Have you considered my servant Job? For there is none like him in the earth . . . ."

Rabbi Berekiah and Rabbi Ḥelbo taught in the name of Rabbi Samuel bar Naḥman that the Vale of Siddim (mentioned in Genesis 14:3 in connection with the battle between the four kings and the five kings) was called the Valley of Shaveh (which means "as one") because there all the peoples of the world agreed as one, felled cedars, erected a large dais for Abraham, set him on top, and praised him, saying (in the words of Genesis 23:6,) "Hear us, my lord: you are a prince of God among us." They told Abraham that he was king over them and a god to them. But Abraham replied that the world did not lack its King, and the world did not lack its God.

A midrash taught that Abraham said (with the words of Genesis 22:1 and 22:11), "'Here I am'—ready for priesthood, ready for kingship" (ready to serve God in whatever role God chose), and Abraham attained both priesthood and kingship. He attained priesthood, as Psalm 110:4 says, "The Lord has sworn, and will not repent: 'You are a priest forever after the manner of Melchizedek." And he attained kingship, as Genesis 23:6 says, "You are a mighty prince among us."

Rav and Samuel differed as to its meaning of "Machpelah"—meaning "double cave"—in Genesis 23:9. One held that the cave consisted of two chambers one within the other, and the other held that it consisted of a lower and upper chamber. According to one, the term "double cave" meant that it was the burial place of multiple couples—Adam and Eve, Abraham and Sarah, Isaac and Rebekah, and Jacob and Leah.

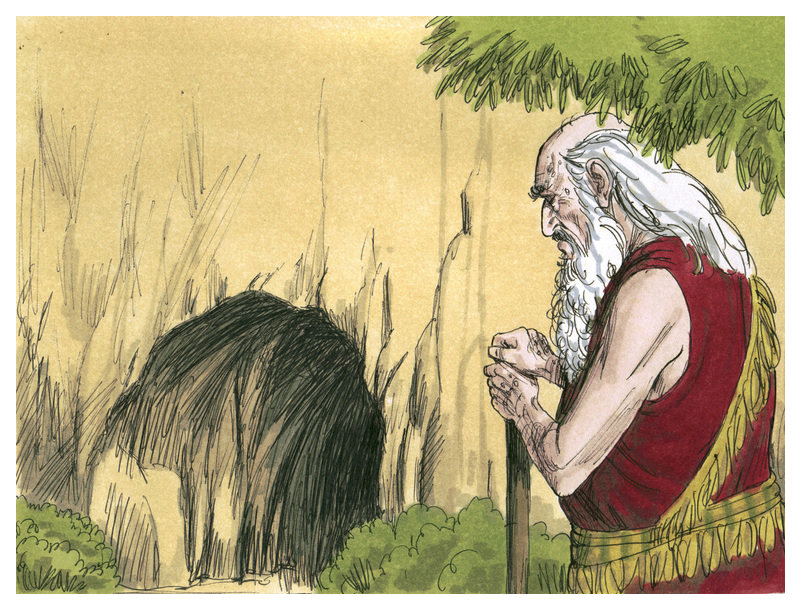
Abraham bought a piece of land with a cave on it. (1984 illustration by Jim Padgett, courtesy of Distant Shores Media/Sweet Publishing)

Similarly, Rabbi Jehudah taught that the three Patriarchs Abraham, Isaac, and Jacob made covenants with the people of the Land of Israel. In Abraham's case, this is how it happened: When the three angels visited him (as reported in Genesis 18), Abraham ran to meet them and prepare for them a great banquet. He told Sarah to prepare cakes for them, but when Sarah was kneading, she perceived that the manner of women was upon her, so Abraham did not serve his visitors any of the cakes. Rather, Abraham ran to fetch a calf, but the calf fled from him and went into the cave of Machpelah. Abraham chased in after the calf and found Adam and Eve lying there upon their beds. Lights were kindled above them, and a sweet scent was upon them. Abraham consequently sought to get the cave as a burial possession. He spoke to the sons of Jebus to purchase the cave from them. The men did not accept his request at first. He began to bow down and prostrate himself to them, as Genesis 23:12 reports, "And Abraham bowed himself down before the people of the land." They told Abraham that they knew that in the future God would give all the land to Abraham and his descendants. Thus, they asked Abraham to make a covenant with them that Abraham's descendants would not take possession of the cities of the Jebusites, and they would sell him the cave of Machpelah as a perpetual possession. So Abraham made a covenant with them with an oath that the Israelites would not take possession of the city of the Jebusites (Jerusalem) without the consent of the Jebusites and then bought the cave of Machpelah as a perpetual possession, as Genesis 23:16 reports, "And Abraham hearkened to Ephron; and Abraham weighed to Ephron the silver, which he had named in the hearing of the children of Heth, four hundred shekels of silver, current money with the merchant." The Jebusites made images of copper inscribed with Abraham's covenant and set them up in the streets of the city. When the Israelites later came to the land, they wished to enter the city of the Jebusites (as reported in Joshua 25:8 and Judges 1:8), but they were unable to enter because of the sign of Abraham's covenant, as Judges 1:21 reports, "And the children of Benjamin did not drive out the Jebusites who inhabited Jerusalem." When David reigned, he wanted to enter the city of the Jebusites, but they did not allow him, as 2 Samuel 5:6 reports, "And the king and his men went to Jerusalem against the Jebusites, the inhabitants of the land; who spoke to David, saying, ‘You shall not come in here.'" Although the Israelites were numerous, they were unable to capture the city because of the force of the sign of Abraham's covenant. David saw this and turned back, as 2 Samuel 5:9 reports, "And David dwelt in the stronghold" (not in the city). David's men told him that he would not be able to enter the city until he had removed all those images upon which Abraham's covenant was written. So David told his men that whoever would remove those images would be the chief. Joab the son of Zeruiah did so and became the chief, as 1 Chronicles 11:6 reports, "And Joab the son of Zeruiah went up first and was made chief." Thereafter, David bought the city of the Jebusites for Israel with a deed for a perpetual possession, as 1 Chronicles 21:25 reports, "So David gave to Ornan for the place six hundred shekels of gold by weight."

The Gemara deduced from the use of the term "take" in Genesis 23:13 that "taking" means by monetary exchange. And thus the Gemara deduced that money effects betrothal by noting the common use of "take" in Genesis 23:13 and in Deuteronomy 22:13, in the words, "If any man take a wife."

Contrasting the behavior of Abraham and Epron, Rabbi Eleazar taught that the righteous promise little and perform much, whereas the wicked promise much and do not perform even little. The Gemara deduced the behavior of the wicked from Ephron, who in Genesis 23:15 said, "The land is worth 400 shekels of silver," but Genesis 23:16 reports, "And Abraham hearkened to Ephron; and Abraham weighed to Ephron the silver, which he had named in the audience of the sons of Heth, 400 shekels of silver, current money with the merchant," indicating that Ephron refused to accept anything but centenaria (which are more valuable than ordinary shekels). And the Gemara deduced the behavior of the righteous from Abraham, who in Genesis 18:5 offered, "And I will fetch a morsel of bread," but Genesis 18:7 reports, "And Abraham ran to the herd," doing much more than he offered.

Rabbi Judan the son of Rabbi Simon cited Abraham's purchase of the cave at Machpelah as one of three places where Scripture reports purchases in the Land of Israel, thus providing a defense against the nations of the world who might taunt the Jews, saying that the Israelites had stolen the Land. The three instances are: the cave of Machpelah, of which Genesis 23:16 reports, "And Abraham weighed to Ephron the silver"; Joseph's Tomb, of which Genesis 33:19 reports, "And he bought the parcel of ground"; and the Temple, of which 1 Chronicles 21:25 reports, "So David gave to Ornan for the place six hundred shekels of gold."

The Mishnah attributed to Abraham a good eye (a magnanimous spirit in financial matters, based, for example, on Abraham's generous and ungrudging nature in his dealings with Ephron the Hittite in Genesis 23:16).

Rabbi Ḥaninah taught that every time the Torah refers to silver coin (שֶׁקֶל כֶּסֶף, shekel kesef) without any qualification, it means a sela (shekel), except for the silver coin that Genesis 23:16 cites in the transaction with Ephron. For although Genesis 23:16 mentions the coinage without qualification, it means centenaria (worth 100 shekels each), because Genesis 23:16 says: "400 shekels of silver current money with the merchant" (implying that wherever there were merchants, these shekels had to be accepted as such), and there is a place where they call centenaria "shekels."

Rav Judah said in the name of Rav that Genesis 23:17, which says, "So the field of Efron which was in Machpelah . . . and all the trees that were in the field that were in the border thereof," indicates that Abraham in buying the field acquired all the small trees that were identified by their surrounding boundary. But the purchase did not include those large, distinctive trees that did not require a surrounding boundary for people to know to whom they belonged. And Rav Mesharsheya deduced from Genesis 23:17 that one who buys a field also gains title to the border strips and the trees on these strips surrounding the field.

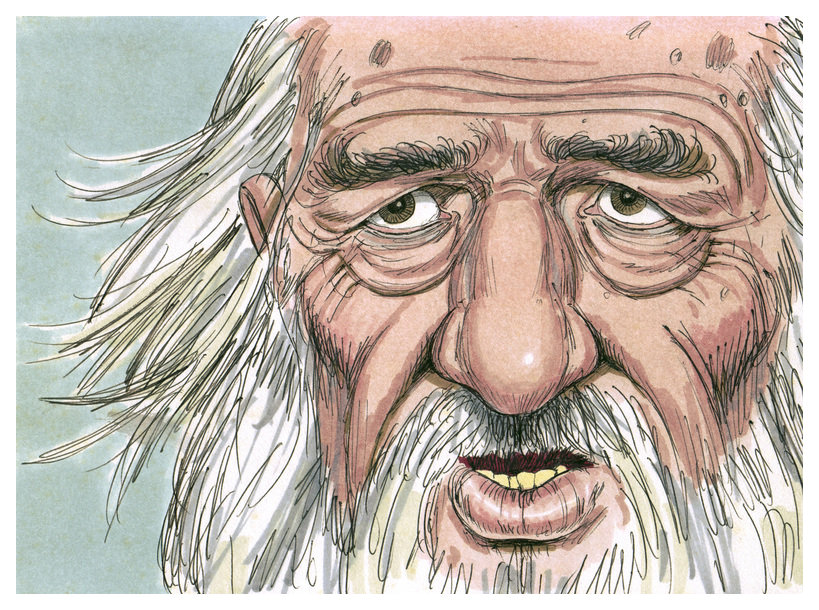
Abraham was very old. (1984 illustration by Jim Padgett, courtesy of Distant Shores Media/Sweet Publishing)

=== Genesis chapter 24 ===
The Mishnah and Tosefta deduced from Genesis 24:1 that God blessed Abraham in his old age because (as the Mishnah deduced from Genesis 26:5) he kept the entire Torah even before it was revealed. And the Tosefta deduced from the contrast between the plenty indicated in Genesis 24:1 and the famine indicated in Genesis 26:1 that God gave the people food and drink and a glimpse of the world to come while the righteous Abraham was alive, so that the people might understand how much they had lost when he was gone.

Rabbi Ḥama ben Ḥanina taught that the ancestors of the Jews were never without a scholars' council. Abraham was an elder and a member of the scholars' council, as Genesis 24:1 says, "And Abraham was an elder (זָקֵן, zaken) well stricken in age." Eliezer, Abraham's servant, was an elder and a member of the scholars' council, as Genesis 24:2 says, "And Abraham said to his servant, the elder of his house, who ruled over all he had," which Rabbi Eleazar explained to mean that he ruled over—and thus knew and had control of—the Torah of his master. Isaac was an elder and a member of the scholars' council, as Genesis 27:1 says: "And it came to pass when Isaac was an elder (זָקֵן, zaken)." Jacob was an elder and a member of the scholars' council, as Genesis 48:10 says, "Now the eyes of Israel were dim with age (זֹּקֶן, zoken)." In Egypt they had the scholars' council, as Exodus 3:16 says, "Go and gather the elders of Israel together." And in the Wilderness, they had the scholars' council, as in Numbers 11:16, God directed Moses to "Gather . . . 70 men of the elders of Israel."

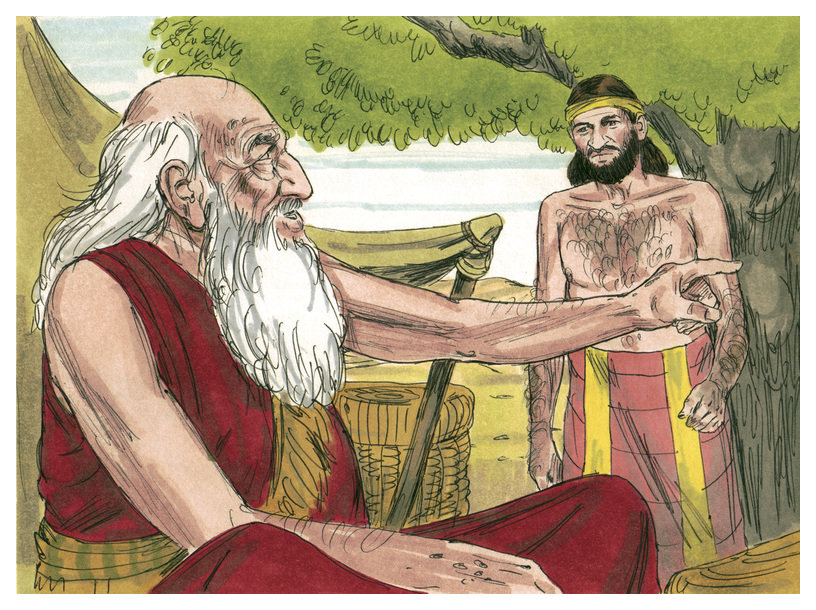
Abraham ordered his servant to get a wife for Isaac. (1984 illustration by Jim Padgett, courtesy of Distant Shores Media/Sweet Publishing)

The Gemara read the words of Genesis 24:1, "And the Lord blessed Abraham with everything," to support the Sages' teaching that God gave three people in this world a taste of the World To Come—Abraham, Isaac, and Jacob. Of Isaac, Genesis 27:33 says, "And I have eaten from everything." And of Jacob, Genesis 33:11 says, "Because I have everything." Already in their lifetimes they merited everything, that is perfection. The Gemara read these three verses also to teach that Abraham, Isaac, and Jacob were three people over whom the evil inclination had no sway, as Scripture says about them, respectively, "with everything," "from everything," and "everything," and the completeness of their blessings meant that they did not have to contend with their evil inclinations. And the Gemara read these same three verses to teach that Abraham, Isaac, and Jacob were three of six people over whom the Angel of Death had no sway in their demise—Abraham, Isaac, Jacob, Moses, Aaron, and Miriam. As Abraham, Isaac, and Jacob were blessed with everything, the Gemara reasoned, they were certainly spared the anguish of the Angel of Death.

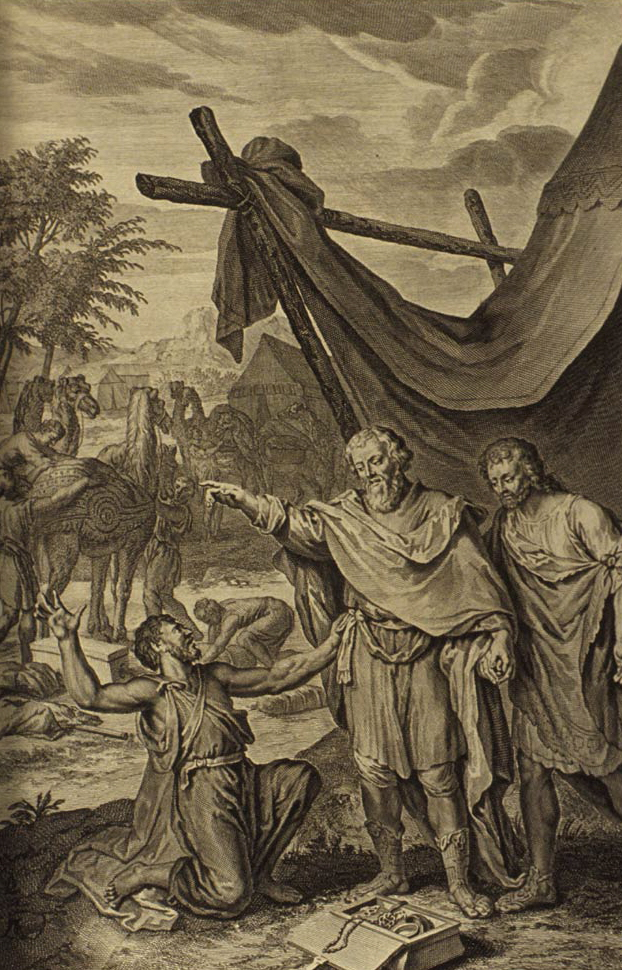
Abraham's Servant Swears (illustration from the 1728 Figures de la Bible)

The Pirke De-Rabbi Eliezer identified the unnamed steward of Abraham's household in Genesis 24:2 with Abraham's servant Eliezer introduced in Genesis 15:2. The Pirke De-Rabbi Eliezer told that when Abraham left Ur of the Chaldees, all the magnates of the kingdom gave him gifts, and Nimrod gave Abraham Nimrod's first-born son Eliezer as a perpetual slave. After Eliezer had dealt kindly with Isaac, he set Eliezer free, and God gave Eliezer his reward in this world by raising him up to become a king—Og, king of Bashan.

The Tosefta reported that Jewish judicial proceedings adopted the oath that Abraham imposed in Genesis 24:3. And Rav Judah said that the judge adjures the witness with the oath stated in Genesis 24:3, "And I will make you swear by the Lord, the God of heaven." Ravina explained that this accorded with the view of Rabbi Ḥaninah bar Idi, who said that Jewish judicial proceedings require swearing by the Name of God. Rav Ashi replied that one might even say that it accorded with the view of the Rabbis, who said that a witness can be adjured with a Substitute for the Name of God. They concluded that the witness needs to hold something sacred in his hand, as Abraham's servant did when in Genesis 24:9 he put his hand under Abraham's thigh and held Abraham's circumcision. Rava said that a judge who adjures by "the Lord God of heaven" without having the witness hold a sacred object errs and must repeat the swearing correctly. Rav Papa said that a judge who adjures with tefillin errs and must repeat the swearing. The law follows Rava, but not Rav Papa, as tefillin are considered sacred.

Rabbi Haggai observed in Rabbi Isaac's name that Abraham prophesied in Genesis 24:7 when he said, "He will send His angel before you." Rabbi Haggai taught in Rabbi Isaac's name that even though Abraham was capable of prophesy, he still needed God's kindness, as Genesis 24:12 reports Abraham's servant praying, "And show kindness to my master Abraham." Rabbi Haggai concluded in Rabbi Isaac's name that all need God's kindness.

Reading the report of Genesis 24:10, "And the servant took ten camels of the camels of his master," a midrash noted that mention that they were "of the camels of his master" is apparently superfluous. The midrash explained that Abraham's camels were distinguishable wherever they went, because they were led out muzzled so as not to graze in other people's fields.

Reading the report of Genesis 24:10 that Abraham's servant had "all the goods of his master's in his hand," Rabbi Ḥelbo explained that this was a deed of gift (made by Abraham of all his wealth to Isaac, so that a bride would be more eager to marry him). Similarly, Rabbi Simeon (or some say Rabbi Shemajah) taught that Abraham wrote a will that bequeathed all that he had as an inheritance to Isaac, as Genesis 25:5 says, "And Abraham gave all that he had to Isaac." Abraham took the document and gave to Eliezer, his servant, who reasoned that since the document was in his hand, all Abraham's money was in his hand, so that he might go and be recommended thereby in Abraham's father's house and with his family.

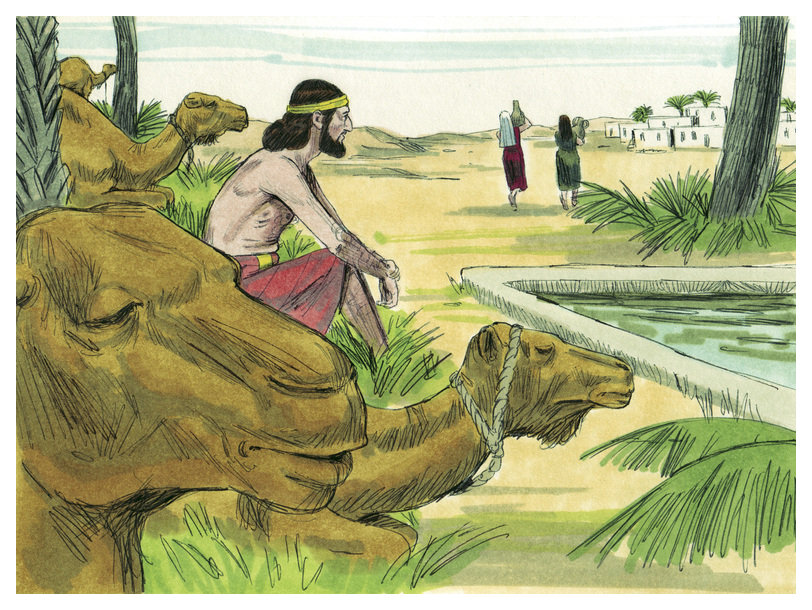
The servant stopped at the well. (1984 illustration by Jim Padgett, courtesy of Distant Shores Media/Sweet Publishing)

Reading the report of the servant's travels in Genesis 24:10, the Pirke De-Rabbi Eliezer taught that from Kiriat Arba to Haran was a journey of 17 days, but Abraham's servant came to Haran in three hours. The servant was astonished that he had arrived on the same day and said (as reported in Genesis 24:42), "And I came this day to the fountain." Rabbi Abbahu taught that God wished to show loving-kindness to Isaac, and he sent an angel before Eliezer to shorten the way for him, so that the servant came to Haran in three hours. Similarly, Rabbi Berekiah taught in Rabbi Isaac's name that the words of Genesis 24:42, "And I came this day to the fountain," mean that Abraham's servant set out that day and miraculously arrived the same day. The midrash thus counted Abraham's servant along with Jacob and Abishai the son of Zeruiah as men who miraculously traveled long distances in a short time when the earth trembled, closing gaps and thereby speeding them along. And similarly, the Rabbis read the words "And I came this day to the well" in Genesis 24:42 to imply that Eliezer had set out that day from Abraham's household and arrived on the same day in Aram-Naharaim. The Rabbis thus taught that the earth shrank to speed Eliezer's journey, as it would again for Jacob (as implied in Genesis 28:10–11) and Abishai the son of Zeruiah.

A midrash asked why, in Genesis 24:11, Abraham's servant stopped by the well. The midrash explained that he thus followed the usual practice: Whoever seeks a neighbor sits at the water and find the neighbor there, as everyone eventually comes to the water. The midrash noted that all the righteous who left their homes went to wells. In addition to Abraham's servant in Genesis 24:11, Genesis 29:2 says of Jacob, "And behold a well in the field," and Exodus 2:15 reports of Moses, "He sat down by a well."

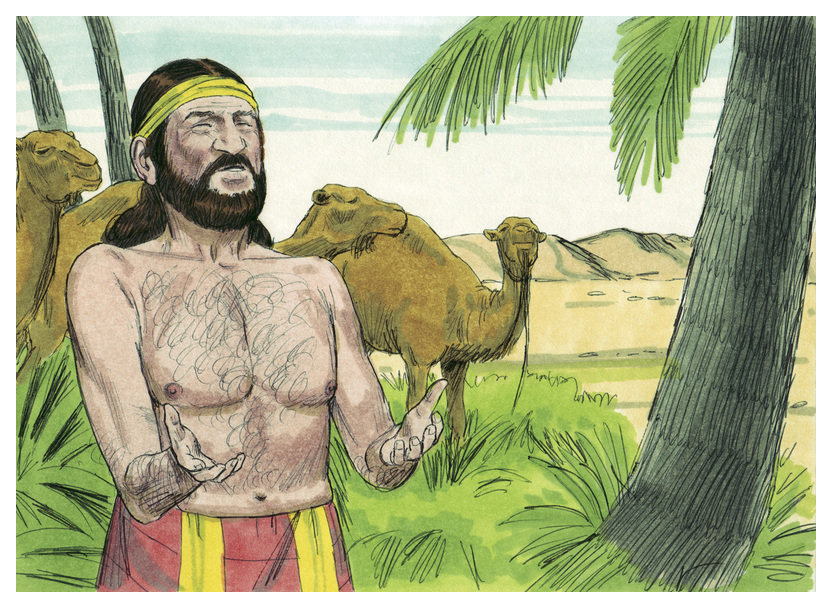
The servant prayed that the Lord would help him. (1984 illustration by Jim Padgett, courtesy of Distant Shores Media/Sweet Publishing)

Reading of the servant's plan in Genesis 24:11, "At the time of evening, the time that women go out to draw water," Rav Huna asked: When a man goes to take a wife and he hears dogs barking, can he then understand what they are saying? Rav Huna taught that there was just as little reason in the servant's plan, "At the time of evening, the time that women go out to draw water."

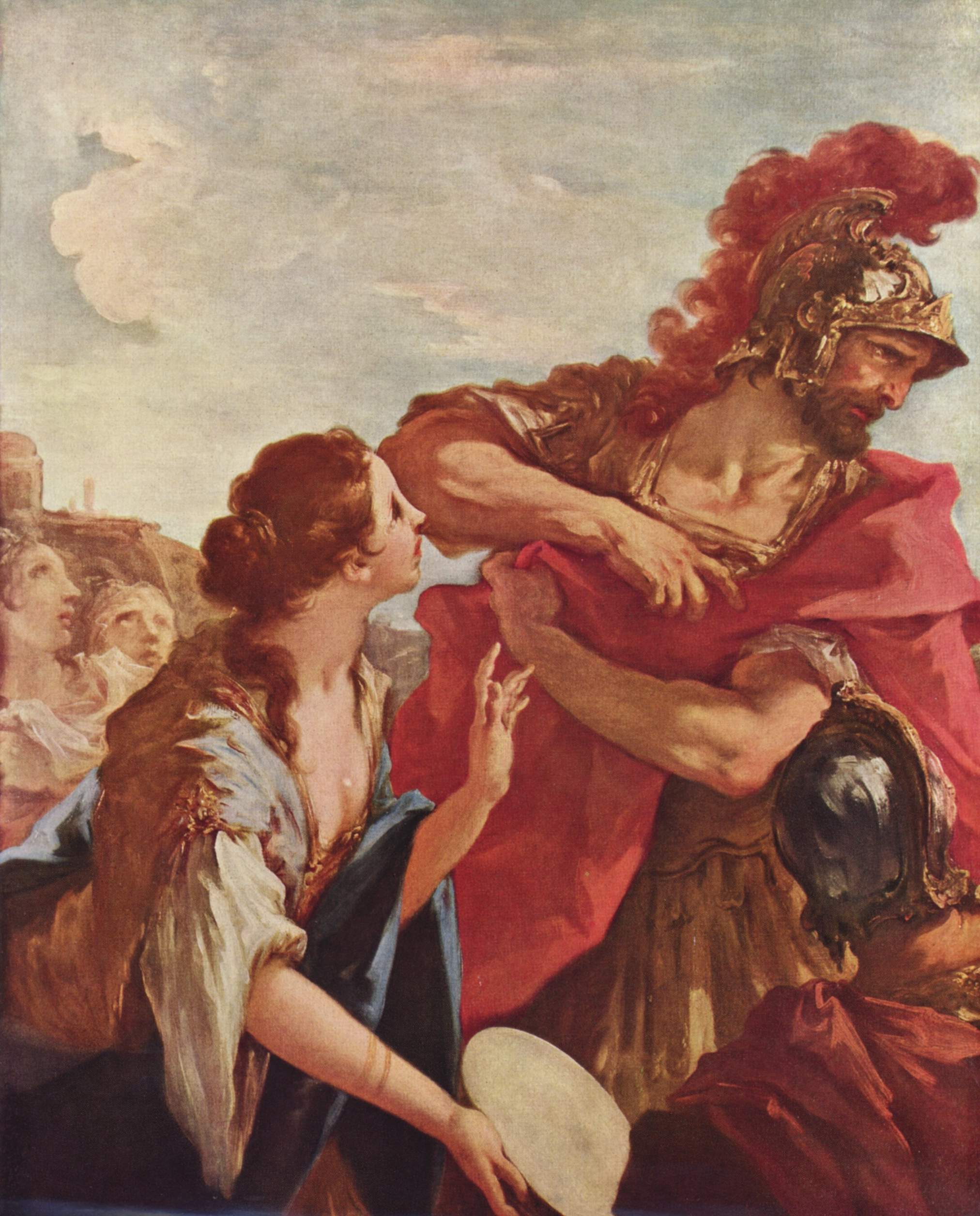
The Return of Jephtha (painting circa 1700–1725 by Giovanni Antonio Pellegrini)

Reading the servant's test in Genesis 24:14, "And she may say, 'Drink,'" a midrash asked why the servant made this the sign that would prove her to be the one (in the words of Genesis 24:44) "whom the Lord has appointed for my master's son." The midrash explained that the servant knew that if she answered that way, she would be a righteous woman, eager to show hospitality, just like Abraham and Sarah.

Rabbi Samuel bar Naḥmani said in the name of Rabbi Jonathan that Abraham's servant Eliezer made an improper request when in Genesis 24:14 he asked God to grant that the young woman whom he would ask to draw water for him and who replied by offering also to water his camels might be the one whom God had decreed for Isaac. Rabbi Samuel asked what would have happened if she had happened to be lame or blind, and concluded that Eliezer was fortunate that Providence answered him by sending Rebekah to meet him. Rabbi Samuel compared Eliezer's request to the improvident oaths that Saul made in 1 Samuel 17:25 when he promised his daughter to the man who would kill Goliath and that Jephthah made in Judges 11:31 when he promised to sacrifice whatever came out of his house to meet him on his return. Similarly, a midrash taught that Abraham's servant was one of four who asked improperly—Eliezer, Caleb, Saul, and Jepthah. The midrash asked: What if a slave woman had done as Eliezer had asked? Yet the midrash taught that God prepared Rebekah for him and granted his request in a fitting manner. And Rav cited Eliezer's request in Genesis 24:14 along with the omen sought by Jonathan in 1 Samuel 14:9–10 as forms of improper acts of divination.

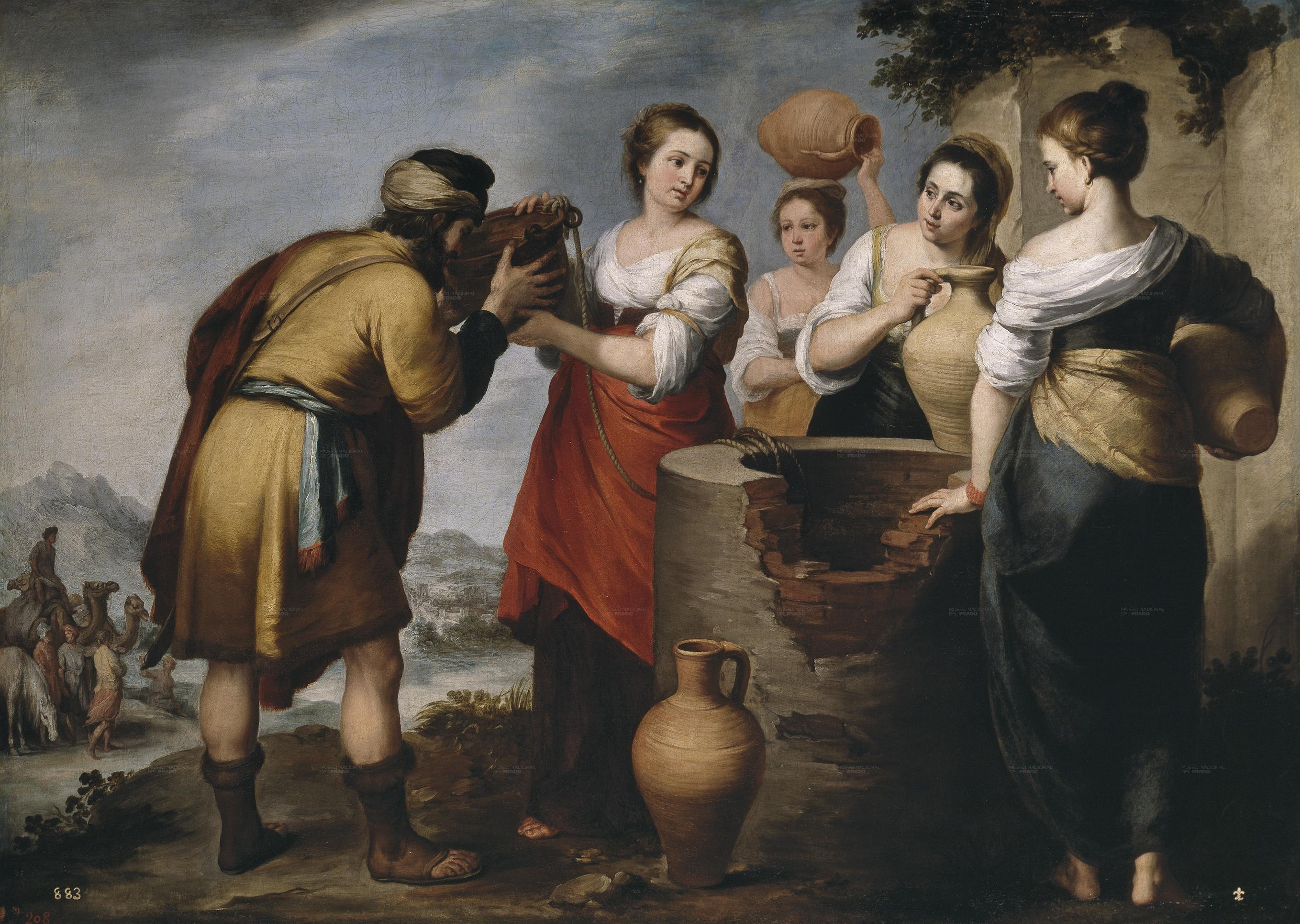
Rebecca and Eliezer (painting circa 1652 by Bartolomé Esteban Murillo)

Rabbi Simeon bar Yoḥai taught that God answered three men even while their petition was still on their lips: Abraham's servant Eliezer, Moses, and Solomon. Regarding Eliezer, Genesis 24:15 reports: "And it came to pass, before he had done speaking, that, behold, Rebekah came out." Regarding Moses, Numbers 16:31 reports: "And it came to pass, as he made an end of speaking all these words, that the ground did cleave asunder." And with regard to Solomon, 2 Chronicles 7:1 reports: "Now when Solomon had made an end of praying, the fire came down from heaven."

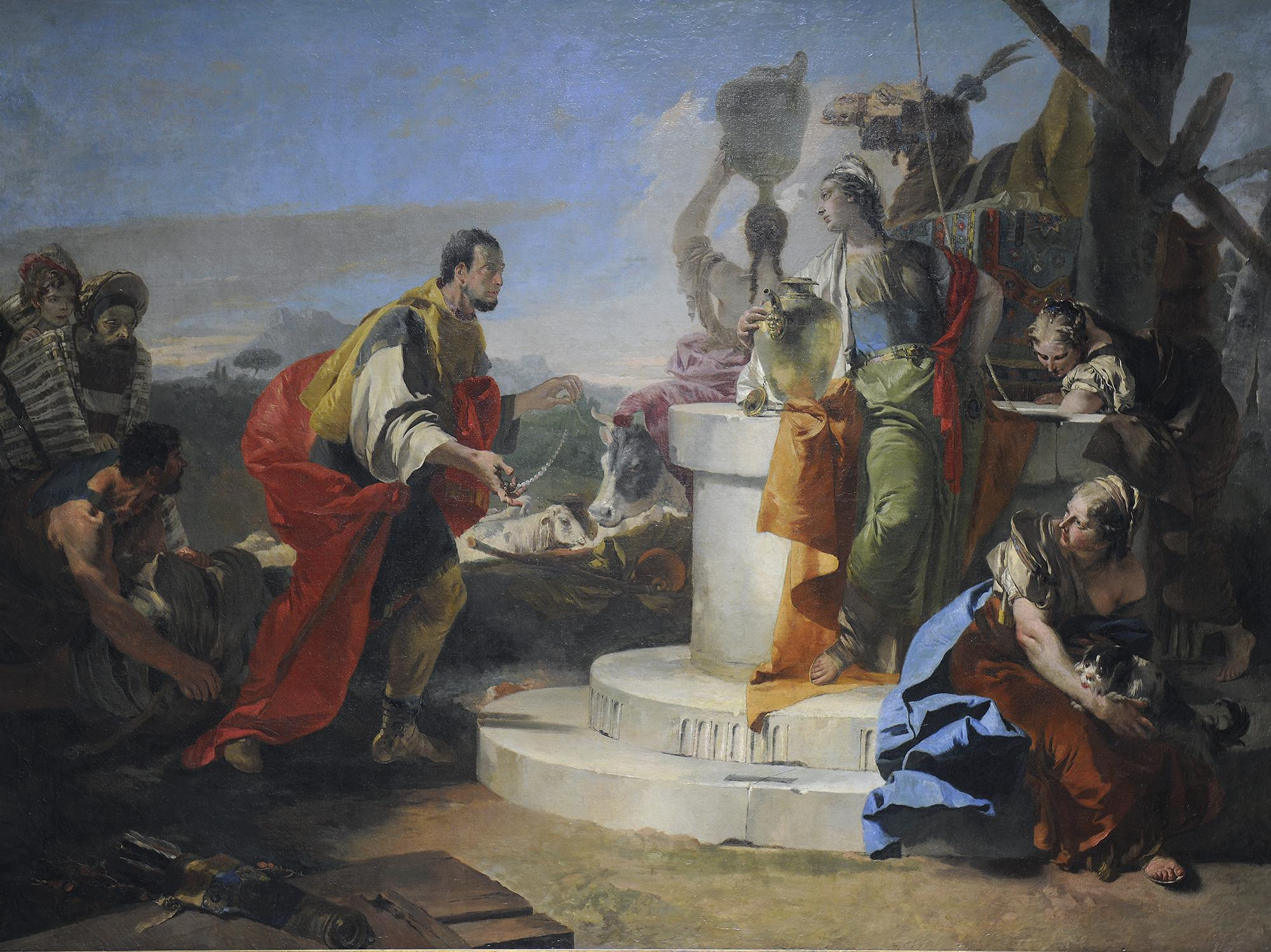
Eliezer and Rebecca (18th Century painting by Giovanni Battista Tiepolo)

The Pirke De-Rabbi Eliezer taught that God saw that everything miraculously came together for Abraham's servant. A daughter of kings, Rebekah, who in all her life had never gone forth to draw water, went out to draw water at that hour. And the girl, who did not know who Abraham's servant was, accepted his proposal to be married to Isaac. The Pirke De-Rabbi Eliezer taught that this happened because she had been destined for him from birth.

Rav Naḥman bar Isaac cited a Tanna that interpreted Genesis 24:16 to teach that Rebekah was virgin between the ages of 12 and 12½ (a naarah) when Abraham's servant encountered her.

Rabbi Isaac called Bethuel a wicked man. A midrash identified Bethuel as a king.

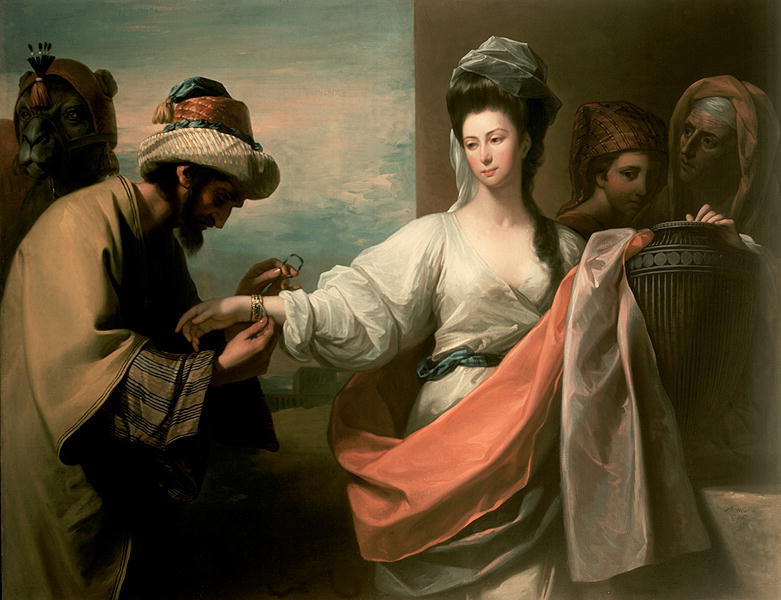
Isaac's servant trying the bracelet on Rebecca's arm (painting circa 1800 by Benjamin West)

Rava asked Rabba bar Mari from where people derived the saying: If you are aware of a derogatory matter about yourself, say it first before others say it about you. Rabba bar Mari answered that the source was what Eliezer said in Genesis 24:34, "And he said: 'I am Abraham's servant,'" immediately proclaiming that he was a servant.

A midrash taught that when Rebekah’s family heard Abraham's servant say in Genesis 24:34, "I am Abraham's servant," they hid their faces in shame and fear, realizing that if this was the servant, how much more so would be his master. They reasoned that one could judge a lion from its welp and concluded that they could not overcome him. Thereupon, they removed the poisoned food that they had given Abraham's servant.

Rav in the name of Rabbi Reuben ben Estrobile cited Laban's and Bethuel's response to Abraham's servant that "The matter was decreed by the Lord" in Genesis 24:50–51 as a proof text for the proposition that God destines a woman and a man for each other in marriage. Rabbi Joshua the son of Rabbi Nehemiah in the name of Rabbi Ḥaninah ben Isaac said that the decree with regard to Rebekah that Laban and Bethuel acknowledged came from Mount Moriah.

But the Pirke De-Rabbi Eliezer taught that Laban and Bethuel said in Genesis 24:50, "The thing proceeds from the Lord: We cannot speak to you bad or good," only because since this word had come forth from God, they could not prevent it.

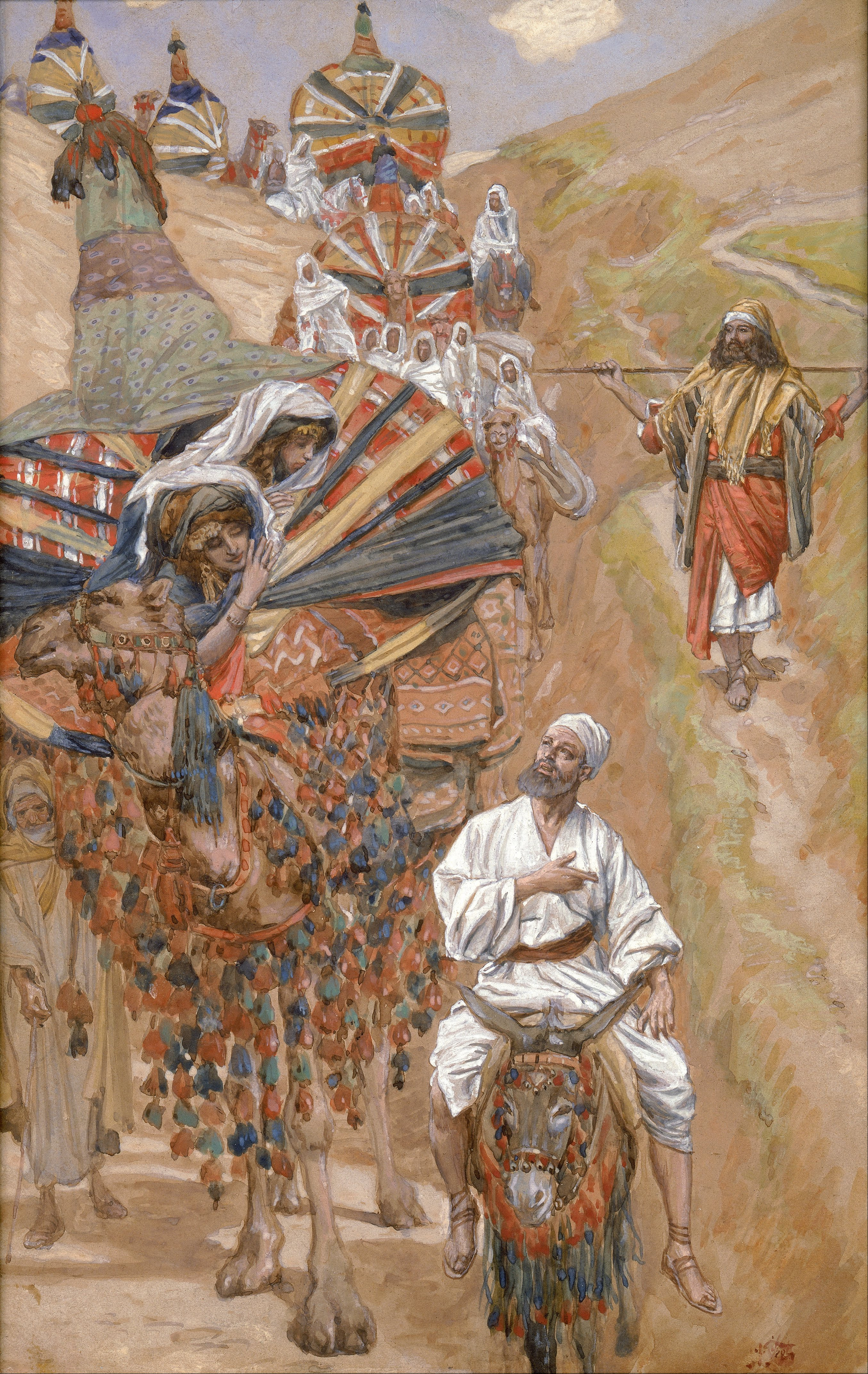
Rebecca Meets Isaac by the Way (watercolor circa 1896–1902 by James Tissot)

Noting that Genesis 24:55 reports that the next day, Rebekah's "brother and her mother said, ‘Let the maiden remain with us some ten days,'" the Rabbis asked where Bethuel was. The midrash concluded that Bethuel wished to hinder Rebekah's marriage, and so he was smitten during the night. The Rabbis said that Abraham's servant did not disclose Bethuel's fate to Isaac.

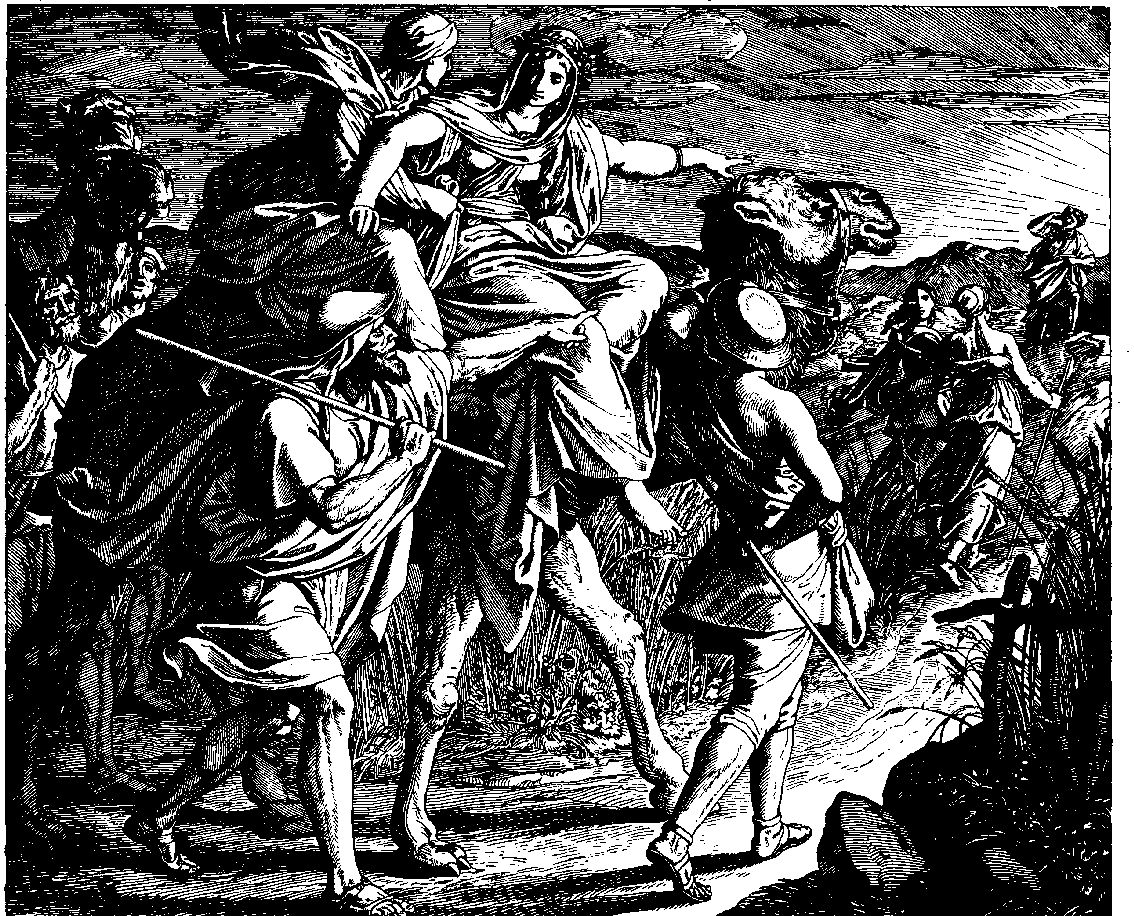
Rebekah Sees Isaac (woodcut by Julius Schnorr von Carolsfeld from the 1860 Die Bibel in Bildern)

Rav Ḥisda interpreted the word "days" (יָמִים, yamim) in Genesis 24:55 to mean "a year." Genesis 24:55 says, "And her brother and her mother said: ‘Let the maiden abide with us yamim, at the least ten." The Gemara reasoned that if יָמִים, yamim, in Genesis 24:55 means "days" and thus to imply "two days" (as the plural implies more than one), then Genesis 24:55 would report Rebekah's brother and mother suggesting first two days, and then when Eliezer said that that was too long, nonsensically suggesting ten days. The Gemara thus deduced that יָמִים, yamim, must mean "a year," as Leviticus 25:29 implies when it says, "if a man sells a house in a walled city, then he may redeem it within a whole year after it is sold; for a full year (יָמִים, yamim) shall he have the right of redemption." Thus Genesis 24:55 might mean, "Let the maiden abide with us a year, or at the least ten months." The Gemara then suggested that יָמִים, yamim, might mean "a month," as Numbers 11:20 suggests when it uses the phrase "a month of days (יָמִים, yamim)." The Gemara concluded, however, that יָמִים, yamim, means "a month" only when the term "month" is specifically mentioned, but otherwise means either "days" (at least two) or "a year." Similarly, the Mishnah taught that they allowed a virgin 12 months to prepare for her wedding after her fiancé told her to prepare.

Reading the servant's words to Laban in Genesis 24:56, "Do not hinder me, for the Lord has prospered my way," the Pirke De-Rabbi Eliezer told that the servant rose early in the morning and saw the angel that had accompanied him standing and waiting for him in the street. The servant then told Laban and his friends the words of Genesis 24:56 and that the man who came with him the day before to prosper his way was standing and waiting for him.

A midrash noted that in Genesis 24:57, Rebekah's brother and mother determined to ask Rebekah if she assented to going with Abraham's servant to marry Isaac. The midrash deduced from this that a fatherless maiden may not be given in marriage without her consent.

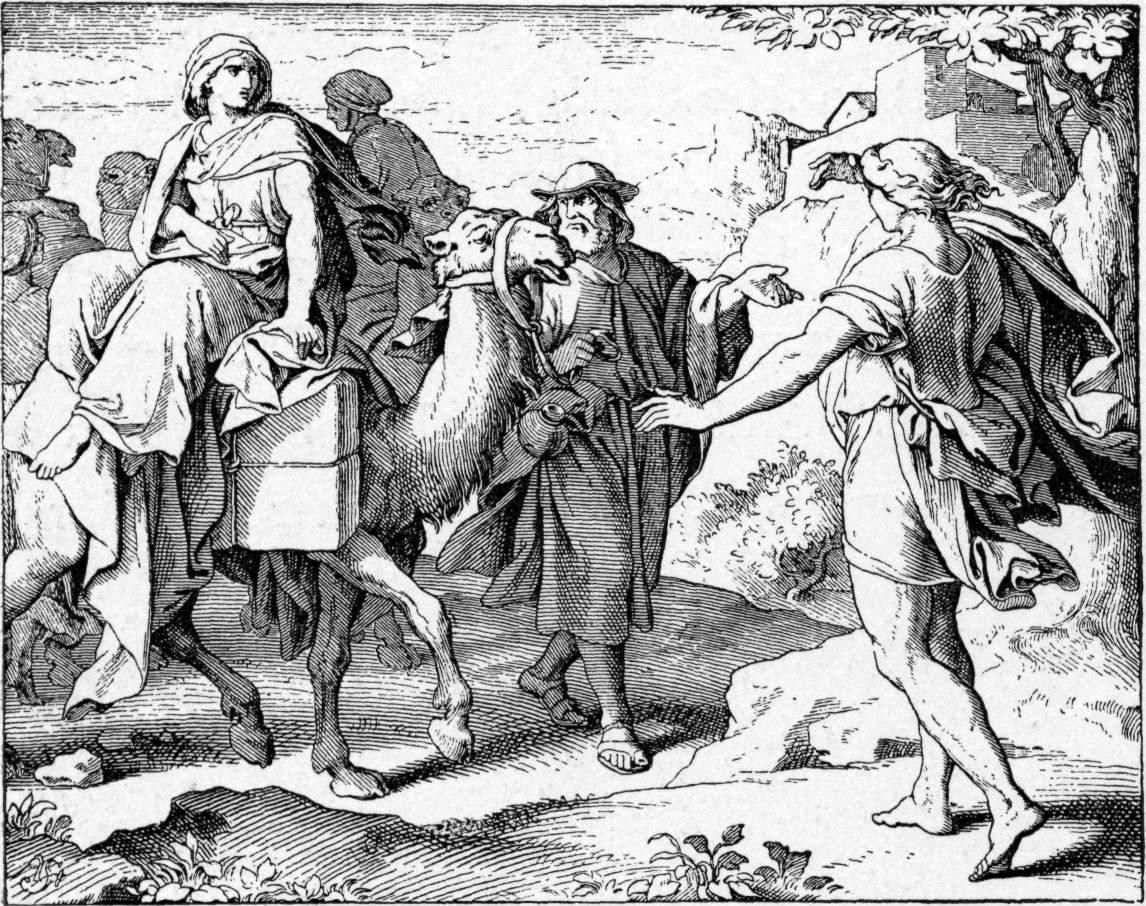
Rebekah has come to the land of Canaan (illustration from the 1897 Bible Pictures and What They Teach Us by Charles Foster)

In Genesis 24:58, Rebekah's brother and mother "called Rebekah, and said to her: ‘Will you go?'" Rabbi Hanina, the son of Rav Adda, said in Rabbi Isaac's name that Rebekah's brother and mother hinted to Rebekah (putting the question in a tone of surprise), "Will you (really) go?" "And she said: ‘I will go.'" Rebekah did not simply say "yes," but replied that she would go, in spite of her brother and mother, whether they wished it or not.

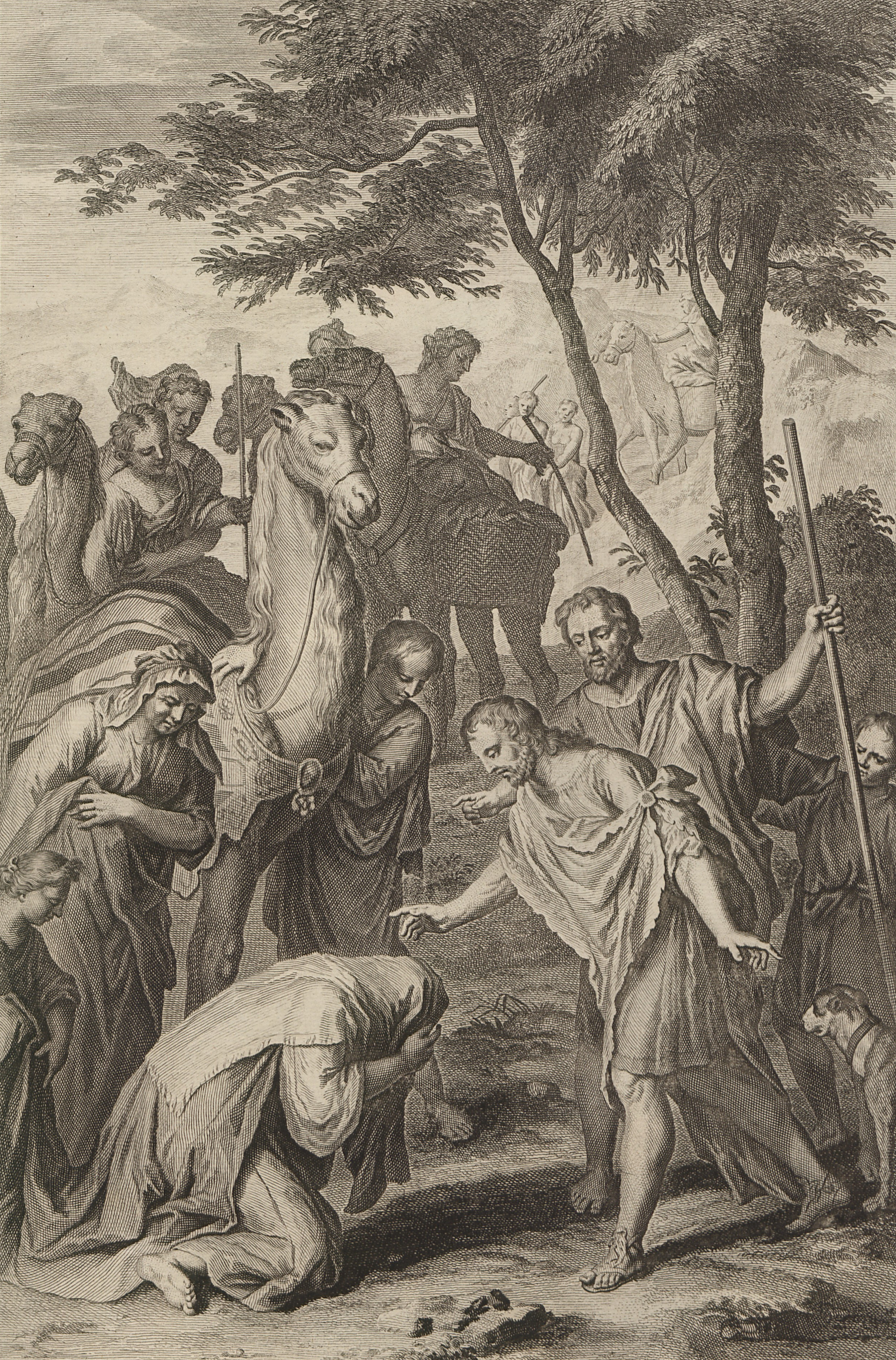
Rebecca lights off the Camel (illustration from the 1728 Figures de la Bible)

The Pirke De-Rabbi Eliezer taught that Laban and his family ate and drank at a bridal banquet for Rebekah. And then, like an officiant who stands and blesses a bride in her bridal canopy, they stood and blessed Rebekah their sister on her upcoming wedding to Isaac, as Genesis 24:60 reports, "And they blessed Rebekah, and said to her, ‘Our sister . . . .'"

Reading Genesis 24:62, "Isaac came from going to Be'er Laḥai Ro'i," a midrash taught that Isaac had gone there to bring Hagar back to Abraham.

The Pirke De-Rabbi Eliezer taught that the servant left Haran at noon and took Rebekah and her nurse Deborah riding on the camels. So that the servant would not be alone with the maiden Rebekah by night, the earth once again contracted before them, and in three hours, they came to Hebron at the time of the afternoon prayer (at 3 p.m.). Isaac had gone forth to say the afternoon prayer, as it is said in Genesis 24:63, "And Isaac went forth to meditate in the field towards evening."

Rabbi Joshua ben Levi (according to the Jerusalem Talmud) or a baraita in accordance with the opinion of Rabbi Yose the son of Rabbi Ḥanina (according to the Babylonian Talmud) said that the three daily prayers derived from the Patriarchs, and cited Genesis 24:63 for the proposition that Jews derived the afternoon prayer from Isaac, arguing that within the meaning of Genesis 24:63, "speak" meant "pray," just as it did in Psalm 102:1. Thus, interpreting Genesis 24:64, Rav Huna taught that when Rebekah first saw Isaac, she saw his hand stretched out in prayer.

Rabbi Elazar noted that Isaiah 2:3 says, "And many peoples shall go and say: 'Go and let us go up to the mountain of the Lord, to the house of the God of Jacob,'" and asked why the verse refers only to Jacob, and not to Abraham and Isaac. Rabbi Elazar explained that the Temple will ultimately be described in the same way that Jacob referred to it in Genesis 28:19. It will not be referred to as it was referred to by Abraham, for when he prayed at the location of the Temple mount, he called it "mount," as Genesis 22:14 says, "As it is said on this day: On the mount where the Lord is seen." And it will not be referred to as it was referred to by Isaac, for he called the location of the Temple "field" when he prayed there, as Genesis 24:63 says, "And Isaac went out to meditate in the field." Rather, it will be described as Jacob referred to it, as a house, as Genesis 28:19 says, "And he called the name of that place Beth-El," which means "house of God."

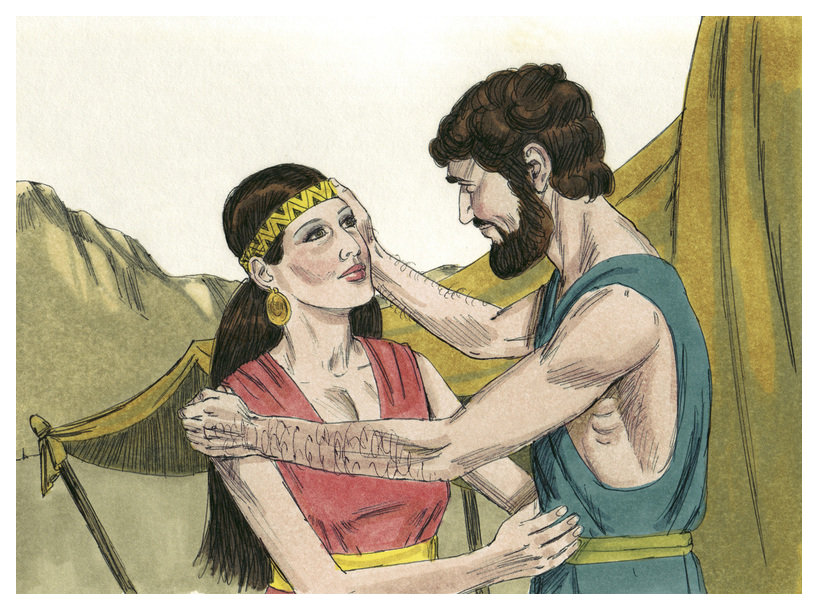
Isaac loved Rebekah. (1984 illustration by Jim Padgett, courtesy of Distant Shores Media/Sweet Publishing)

Rabbi José taught that Isaac observed three years of mourning for his mother. After three years he married Rebekah and forgot the mourning for his mother. Hence Rabbi José taught that until a man marries a wife, his love centers on his parents. When he marries a wife, he bestows his love upon his wife, as Genesis 2:24 says, "Therefore shall a man leave his father and his mother, and he shall cleave unto his wife."

A midrash taught that as long as Sarah lived, a cloud (signifying the Divine Presence) hung over her tent. When she died, the cloud disappeared. But when Rebekah came, it returned. As long as Sarah lived, her doors were wide open. At her death that liberality ceased. But when Rebekah came, that openhandedness returned. As long as Sarah lived, there was a blessing on her dough, and the lamp used to burn from the evening of the Sabbath until the evening of the following Sabbath. When she died, these ceased. But when Rebekah came, they returned. And so when Isaac saw Rebekah following in his mother Sarah's footsteps, separating her challah in cleanness and handling her dough in cleanness (rereading the words of Genesis 24:67), "Isaac brought her into the tent, (and, behold, she was like) his mother Sarah."

Rabbi Judan read Genesis 24:67 to teach a rule of propriety: If a man has grown-up sons (and both the man and his sons wish to marry), he must first see that his sons marry and then take a wife himself. Rabbi Judan derived this from Abraham's example, for first Genesis 24:67 says, "And Isaac brought her into his mother Sarah's tent," and after that, Genesis 25:1 says, "And Abraham took another wife, and her name was Keturah."

=== Genesis chapter 25 ===
Rabbi Judah said that Keturah was another name for Hagar.

Rabbi Judah, Rabbi Nehemiah, and the Rabbis differed about the meaning of Genesis 25:5, "And Abraham gave all that he had to Isaac." Rabbi Judah said that Abraham gave Isaac the birthright. Rabbi Nehemiah said that Abraham gave the power of blessing granted to Abraham in Genesis 12:2. The Rabbis said that Abraham gave the privilege of being buried in the cave of Machpelah and a deed of gift. Rabbi Judah the son of Rabbi Simon, Rabbi Berekiah, and Rabbi Levi in the name of Rabbi Ḥama the son of Rabbi Ḥanina taught that Abraham did not bless Isaac but gave him gifts. Rabbi Ḥama likened this to a king who had an orchard, which he entrusted to a steward. The orchard contained two trees that were intertwined, and one of which yielded life-giving fruit and the other a deadly poison. The steward thought that if he watered the life-bearing tree, the death-bearing one would flourish with it; while if he did not water the death-bearing tree, the life-bearing could not survive. On reflection, the steward decided that his position required him to do his duty, and whatever the owner of the orchard wished to do, he could do. In like manner, Abraham argued that if he blessed Isaac, the children of Ishmael and of Keturah would also be blessed; while if he did not bless the children of Ishmael and Keturah, he could not bless Isaac. On reflection, he decided that he was only flesh; he would do his duty, and whatever God wished to do, God would do. Consequently, when Abraham died, God appeared to Isaac and blessed him, as Genesis 25:11 reports, "And it came to pass after the death of Abraham, that God blessed Isaac his son."

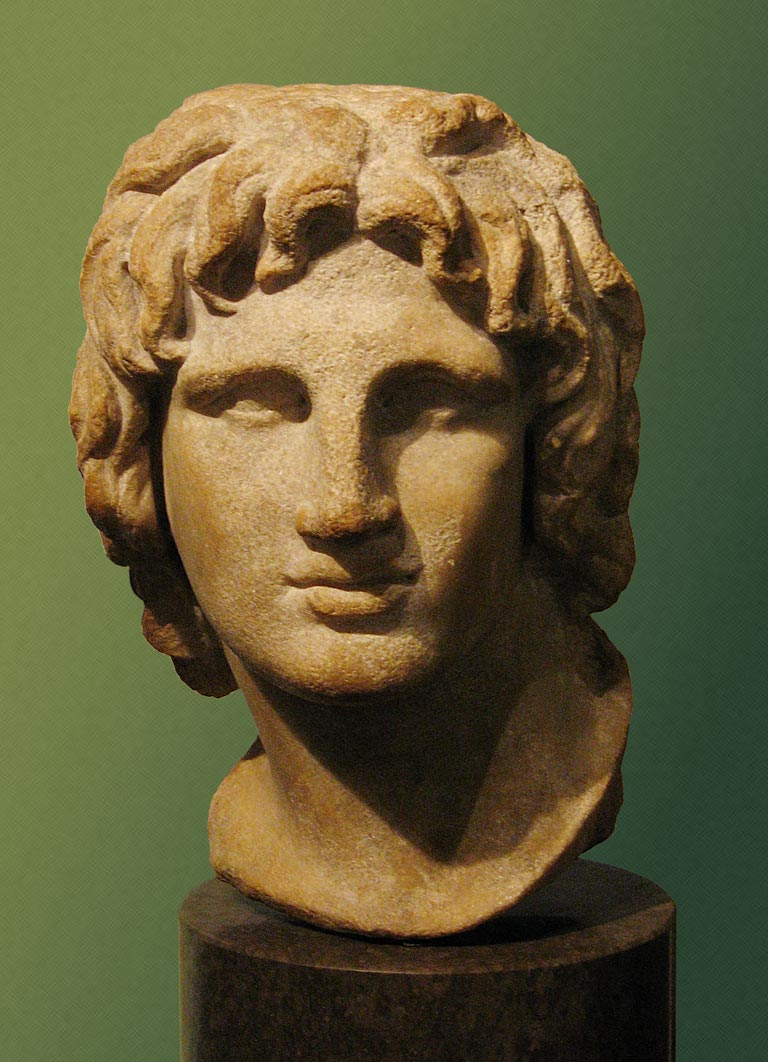
Alexander the Great (Hellenistic marble bust of the 2nd-1st century BCE in the British Museum)

A midrash told that the Ishmaelites came before Alexander the Great to dispute the birthright with Israel, accompanied by the Canaanites and the Egyptians. The Ishmaelites based their claim on Deuteronomy 21:17, "But he shall acknowledge the firstborn, the son of the hated," and Ishmael was the firstborn. Gebiah the son of Kosem representing the Jews, asked Alexander whether a man could not do as he wished to his sons. When Alexander replied that a man could, Gebiah quoted Genesis 25:5, "And Abraham gave all that he had to Isaac." The Ishmaelites asked where the deed of gift to his other sons was. Gebiah replied by quoting Genesis 25:7, "But to the sons of the concubines, whom Abraham had, Abraham gave gifts." Thereupon the Ishmaelites departed in shame.

Rabbi Ḥama son of Rabbi Ḥaninah taught that Genesis 25:11 shows God comforting the mourning Isaac, and thus demonstrates one of God's attributes that humans should emulate. Rabbi Ḥama son of Rabbi Ḥaninah asked what Deuteronomy 13:5 means in the text, "You shall walk after the Lord your God." How can a human being walk after God, when Deuteronomy 4:24 says, "[T]he Lord your God is a devouring fire"? Rabbi Ḥama son of Rabbi Ḥaninah explained that the command to walk after God means to walk after the attributes of God. As God clothes the naked—for Genesis 3:21 says, "And the Lord God made for Adam and for his wife coats of skin and clothed them"—so should we also clothe the naked. God visited the sick—for Genesis 18:1 says, "And the Lord appeared to him by the oaks of Mamre" (after Abraham was circumcised in Genesis 17:26.)—so should we also visit the sick. God comforted mourners—for Genesis 25:11 says, "And it came to pass after the death of Abraham, that God blessed Isaac his son"—so should we also comfort mourners. God buried the dead—for Deuteronomy 34:6 says, "And He buried him in the valley"—so should we also bury the dead. Similarly, the Sifre on Deuteronomy 11:22 taught that to walk in God's ways means to be (in the words of Exodus 34:6) "merciful and gracious."

== In medieval Jewish interpretation ==
The parashah is discussed in these medieval Jewish sources:

=== Genesis chapter 24 ===
Baḥya ibn Paquda taught that because humans cannot understand anything about God except for God’s Name and that God exists, Abraham associated God’s Name with heaven and earth when he said in Genesis 24:3, "And I will make you swear by the Lord, the God of heaven and the God of the earth."

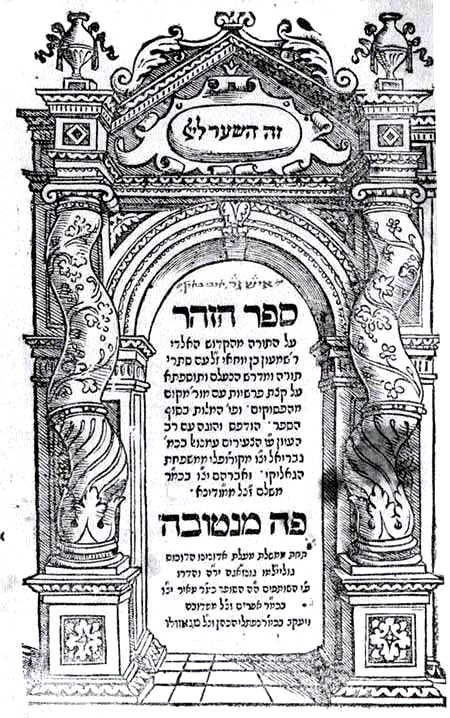
The Title Page of the Zohar

Abraham ibn Ezra read the words “He will send His angel before you” in Genesis 24:7 as a prayer. Ibn Ezra argued that if it were a prophecy, Abraham would not have said in Genesis 24:8, “And if the woman is not willing to follow you . . . .”

The Zohar taught that when Abraham's servant reached Haran and met Rebekah (in the words of Genesis 24:11) "at the time of evening," it was the time of the afternoon (מִנְחָה, mincha) prayer. Thus, the moment when Isaac began the afternoon prayer coincided with the moment when Abraham's servant encountered Rebekah. So, too, Rebekah came to Isaac (as reported in Genesis 24:64) at the very moment of Isaac's afternoon prayer.

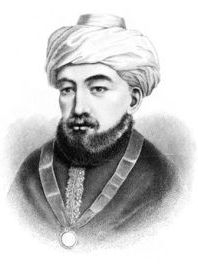
Maimonides

Reading Genesis 24:14, Obadiah ben Jacob Sforno distinguished what Abraham's servant did from divination. According to Sforno, Abraham's servant did not make what he said a sign whereby he might recognize Isaac's destined wife, because that would be divination; rather he prayed that it might occur the way that he described. If an individual says something not as a prayer, but in the nature of, "If such-and-such happens, then I shall do this," then the individual is guilty of divination.

The Zohar taught that Rabbi Simeon discoursed on Malachi 1:6, “A son honors his father, and a servant his master,” saying that Eliezer illustrated a servant's honoring his master by carrying out all Abraham's wishes and paying him great respect, as Genesis 24:34–35 reports, “And he said, ‘I am Abraham’s servant; and the Lord blessed my master Abraham.’” Eliezer had with him silver, gold, precious stones, and camels, and was himself quite handsome; yet he did not present himself as Abraham’s friend or family, but openly declared, “I am the servant of Abraham,” in order to extol his master and make him an object of honor in the eyes of Rebekah's family.

Maimonides cited Laban and Bethuel's words regarding Rebekah in Genesis 24:51, "Let her be a wife to the son of your master, as the Lord spoke," as an example of the proposition that Scripture ascribes to God events evidently due to chance.

=== Genesis chapter 25 ===
Rashbam identified the "concubines" to whom Genesis 25:6 refers as Hagar and Keturah.

The Zohar, however, deduced from the plural of "concubines" in Genesis 25:6 that Abraham had two concubines beside Sarah and Hagar and thus like Jacob had four spouses.

== In modern interpretation ==
The parashah is discussed in these modern sources:

=== Genesis chapter 23 ===
John Van Seters argued that the Abraham cycle was a postexilic invention of the 5th century CE or later.

=== Genesis chapter 24 ===
Genesis 24:22 refers to a gold ring of half a shekel or a bekah (בֶּקַע) in weight and gold bracelets of ten shekels in weight. This table translates units of weight used in the Bible into their modern equivalents:

Weight Measurements in the Bible
Unit	Texts	Ancient Equivalent	Modern Equivalent
gerah (גֵּרָה)	Exodus 30:13; Leviticus 27:25; Numbers 3:47; Numbers 18:16; Ezekiel 45:12	1/20 shekel	0.6 gram; 0.02 ounce
bekah (בֶּקַע)	Genesis 24:22; Exodus 38:26	10 gerahs; half shekel	6 grams; 0.21 ounce
pim (פִים)	1 Samuel 13:21	2/3 shekel	8 grams; 0.28 ounce
shekel (שֶּׁקֶל)	Exodus 21:32; 30:13, 15, 24; 38:24, 25, 26, 29	20 gerahs; 2 bekahs	12 grams; 0.42 ounce
mina (maneh, מָּנֶה)	1 Kings 10:17; Ezekiel 45:12; Ezra 2:69; Nehemiah 7:70	50 shekels	0.6 kilogram; 1.32 pounds
talent (kikar, כִּכָּר)	Exodus 25:39; 37:24; 38:24, 25, 27, 29	3,000 shekels; 60 minas	36 kilograms; 79.4 pounds

== Commandments ==
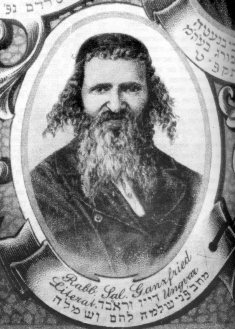
Shlomo Ganzfried, editor of the Kitzur Shulchan Aruch

According to Maimonides and Sefer ha-Chinuch, there are no commandments in the parashah.

The Kitzur Shulchan Aruch taught that people who have animals who are dependent on them for their food are prohibited from eating until they feed their animals, based on Deuteronomy 11:15, "I will grant grass for your cattle in your field, that you may eat and be satisfied," which gives precedence to animals eating before people. But the Kitzur Shulchan Aruch noted that people came before animals with regard to drinking in Genesis 24:14, which says, "Drink and I will also draw for your camels," and Numbers 20:8 which says, "And you will provide water for the congregation and their cattle."

== In the liturgy ==
The parashah is reflected in these parts of the Jewish liturgy:

Some Jews refer to the ten trials of Abraham in Genesis 12–25 as they study chapter 5 of Pirkei Avot on a Sabbath between Passover and Rosh Hashanah.

In the Blessing after Meals (Birkat Hamazon), at the close of the fourth blessing (of thanks for God's goodness), Jews allude to God's blessing of the Patriarchs described in Genesis 24:1, 27:33 and 33:11.

The Sages deduced from Isaac's "meditation . . . toward evening" in Genesis 24:63 that Isaac began the practice of the afternoon (מִנְחָה, mincha) prayer service.

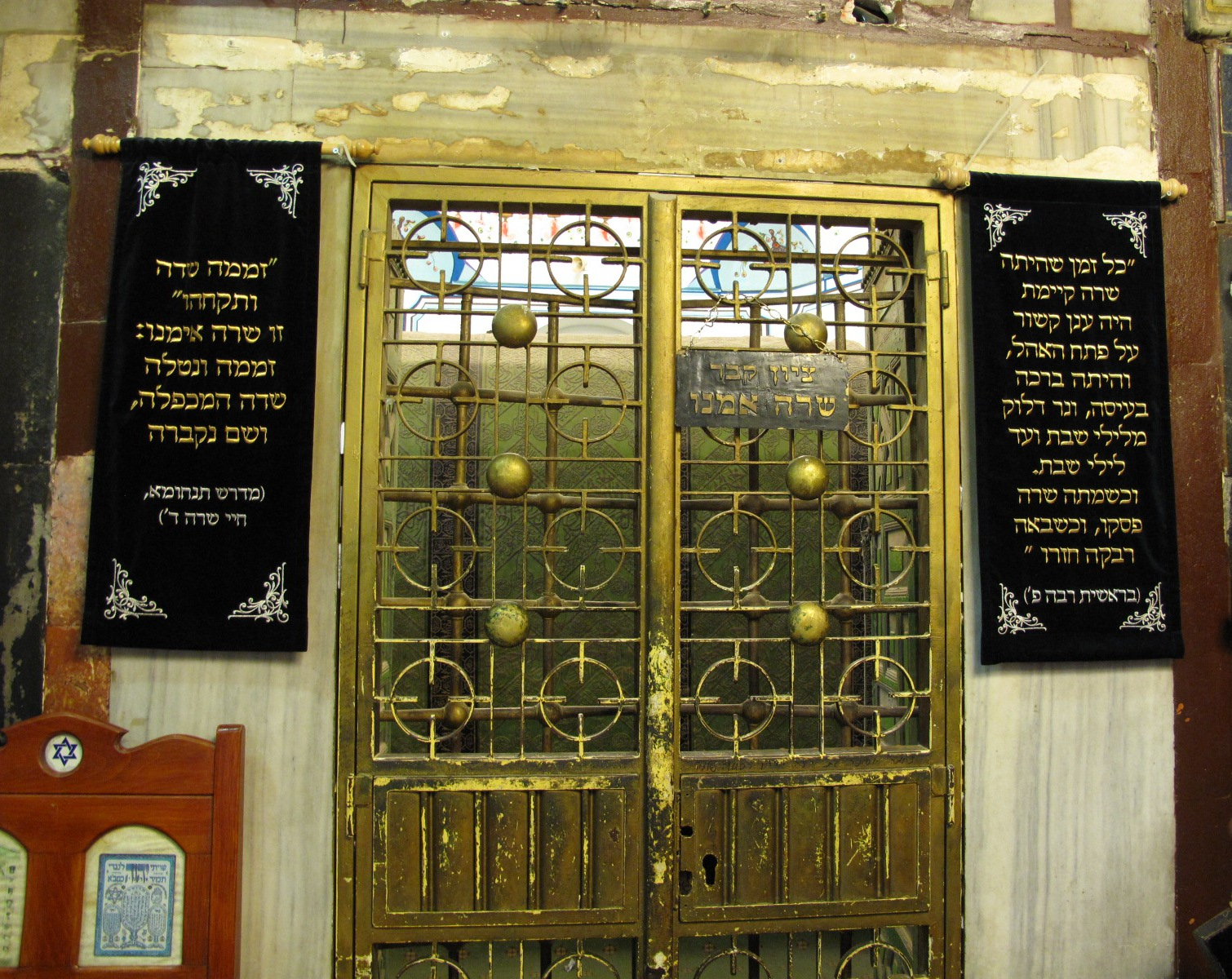
Room containing the cenotaph of Sarah in the Tomb of Machpela complex

== The Weekly Maqam ==
In the Weekly Maqam, Sephardi Jews each week base the songs of the services on the content of that week's parashah. For Parashat Chayei Sarah, Jews from Aleppo apply Maqam Hijaz, the maqam that expresses mourning and sadness in Syrian Jewish traditions, because the parashah contains the deaths of both Sarah and Abraham. Jews from Damascus, meanwhile, will use Maqam Saba, which is generally the Maqam for painful occasions across the Arab world.

== Tomb of Sarah ==
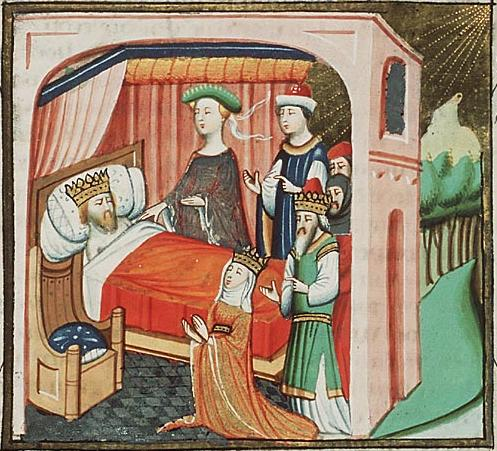
Abishag at the bed of David, with Bathsheba, Solomon, and Nathan (from a Dutch Bible circa 1435)

The tomb of Sarah is located in the Cave of Machpelah in Hebron along with that of Abraham and the other Biblical Matriarchs and Patriarchs. Every year on the Shabbat in which Parashat Chayei Sarah is read in synagogue services, thousands of people visit the site. Known as Shabbat Hebron, the weekend can attract more than 35,000 people.

== Haftarah ==
A haftarah is a text selected from the books of Nevi'im ("The Prophets") that is read publicly in the synagogue after the reading of the Torah on Sabbath and holiday mornings. The haftarah usually has a thematic link to the Torah reading that precedes it.

The specific text read following Parashah Chayei Sarah varies according to different traditions within Judaism. Examples are:

- for Ashkenazi Jews, Sephardi Jews, and Dardai communities: 1 Kings 1:1–31
- for Yemenite Jews: 1 Kings 1:1–36, 46
- for Karaite Jews: Isaiah 51:2–22
- for Italian Jews: 1 Kings 1:1–34
