= Tomb of Othniel Ben Kenaz =

Jewish heritage site in Hebron

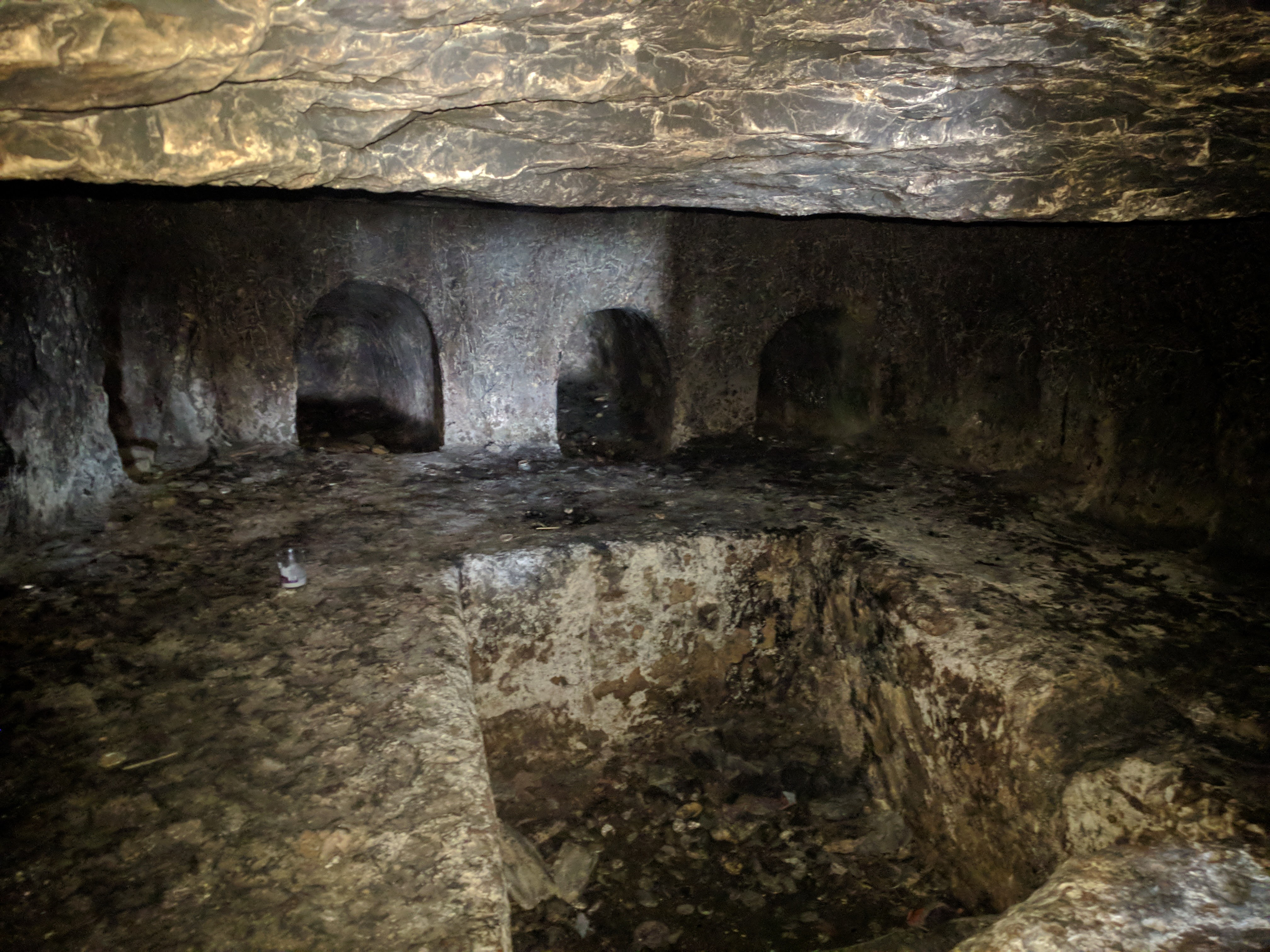
- Inside the main chamber of the burial cave

- Location within Israel

Religion
- Affiliation: Judaism

Location
- Location: West Bank
- Coordinates: 31°32′00″N 35°05′42″E

Architecture
- Type: Burial cave
- Established: Probably after the Mishnah time period (c. after 6th–7th centuries BCE)

The Tomb of Othniel Ben Kenaz is a burial cave located in Hebron. The cave contains ten burial niches, one of which is for Othniel, the first of the Israelite judges. The cave is a popular destination for the Jewish people and holiday prayer services are held there.

== History ==
The burial cave is currently located 200 meters west of the Beit Hadassah building in Hebron. It might have been built in a time period within the Mishnah (6th–7th centuries BCE) due to its architecture, which is dated to around that period. Prayer services for holidays including the Lag BaOmer or Tisha B'Av have been held at the site as well.

=== Mamluk and Ottoman periods ===
During the rule of the Mamluk Sultanate, a housing estate was built above the burial cave. The cave itself served as a well-ventilated basement where sheep were reared, because the area was not comfortable to live in and there were no human remains discovered upon excavation. However, the cave was reportedly under a vineyard by the time the Ottoman Empire took over leadership of the West Bank (after 1516).

Menachem Mendel, a hotelier of Jerusalem, reported in his 1839 book Sefer Korot Ha-Itim about the condition of the burial cave and how an entrance fee had to be paid in order to be granted access. He says;

Outside of the city, I went to the grave of Othniel ben Kenaz and, next to him, are laid to rest nine students; these in the niches in the wall of a shelter standing in a vineyard. I gave 20 pa’res to the owner of the vineyard.

Writing in the 19th century, the traveller J. J. Benjamin narrated the following about the cave in his book Eight Years in Asia and Africa:

Likewise outside the city, towards the south, in a vineyard, which was purchased by the Jews, are the graves of the father of King David and of the first Judge, Othniel, the son of Kinah.

=== Post-war history ===
After the 1948 Arab–Israeli War had ended, Israeli soldiers entered the site to renovate the cave before installing a sign or plaque in Hebrew and Arabic which indicated the burial of Othniel within the cave.

In 2022, clashes between Israelis and Palestinians occurred at the site. The Israeli Defence Force were called in to quell the violence.

== Architecture ==
The cave has an area of 130 square metres. There are ten compartments in the walls of the cave to align with burial practices stated in the Mishnah. These ten compartments are actually burial niches; Othniel is buried in one of them, while nine of his students are buried in the others. However, J.J Benjamin states that Jesse, the father of David is buried in one of the nine remaining burial niches.

== Religious significance ==
The site has been venerated by the Jews for generations. It is a popular religious destination for Jews, both locals and tourists. Annually, Shabbat Chayei Sarah is celebrated there on a Saturday, where the Torah is recited. On religious holidays like Lag BaOmer and Tisha B'Av, prayer services are held in the cave. During the mass pilgrimages to the site, the IDF is responsible for ensuring the safety and security of Jewish pilgrims.

== See also ==
- List of burial places of Abrahamic figures
