= Genesis 25 =

Genesis 25 may refer to:

- The Jewish parashah Chayei Sarah, covering verses 1 to 18 of this chapter in the Book of Genesis, or
- The Jewish parashah Toledot, covering verses 19 to 34 of the same chapter.
