= Haran =

Biblical character

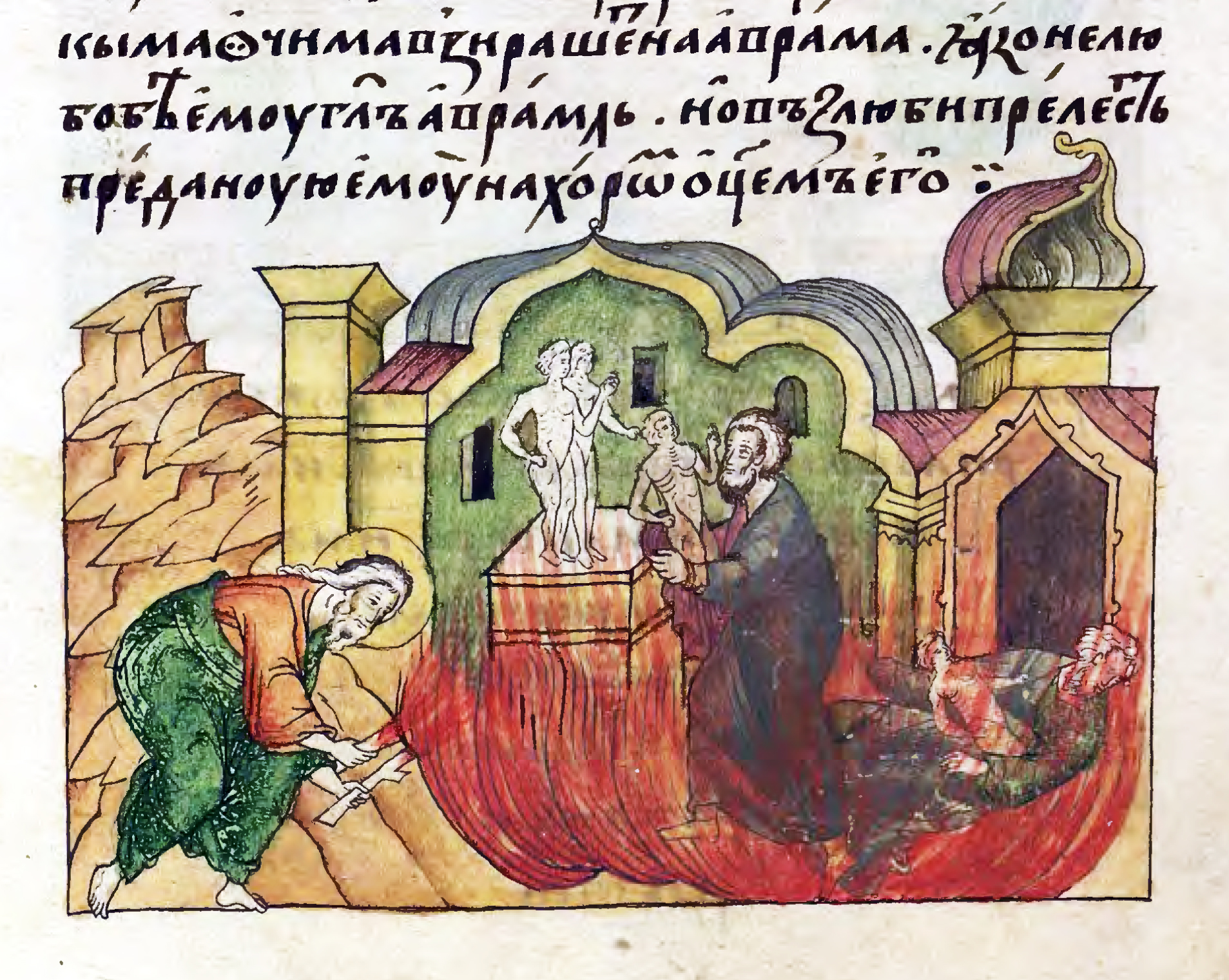
- Death of Haran
- Born: Ur of the Chaldees
- Died: Paddan Aram/Harran
- Other name: Aran
- Children: Lot (son), Milcah (daughter), Iscah (daughter)
- Parent: Terah (father)
- Relatives: Abraham (brother); Nahor (brother)

Haran (Hebrew: הָרָן Hārān) is a man in the Book of Genesis in the Hebrew Bible. He was a son of Terah, brother of Abraham, and father of son Lot and daughters Milcah and Iscah. He died in Ur of the Chaldees. Through Lot, Haran was the ancestor of the Moabites and Ammonites.

== Haran and his family ==
Terah, a descendant of Shem son of Noah, was the father of Abram/Abraham, Nahor, and Haran. Their home's location is not certain, but it is usually supposed to have been in Mesopotamia. Besides Lot and Milcah, Haran fathered a daughter Iscah.

After Haran died in Ur of the Chaldees "before his father Terah", his family travelled towards Canaan, the Promised Land. However, Terah stopped at Harran [Hebrew חָרָן, Ḥārān]) and settled there, as did Nahor and Milcah, whereas Lot accompanied Abraham and others onwards to Canaan.

According to legends from the Book of Jubilees, Terah owned his father's and grandfather's sculpture workshop, where he made idols and sold them successfully. This greatly irritated the pious Abraham. In one version, Abraham simply smashes the statues in his father's workshop, whereas in another, Abraham sets fire to the temple where his father's idols were shown, and Haran died in the fire while trying to save them.

== Etymology ==
The name Haran possibly comes from the Hebrew word har, meaning "mountain", with a West Semitic suffix appearing with proper names, anu/i/a. Thus, it has been suggested that Haran may mean "mountaineer". Personal names which resemble Haran include ha-ri and ha-ru, from texts of second millennium BC Mari and Alalakh, and ha-ar-ri, from one of the Amarna letters, but their meanings are uncertain. The initial element of Haran can be found in the Phoenician personal name hr-b`l, and also in the Israelite personal name hryhw from Gibeon.

== Others called Haran ==
Haran is the English name of two other people mentioned in the Bible.

- Haran, son of Caleb (Hebrew: חָרָן – Ḥārān) (1 Chronicles 2:46).
- Haran, son of Shimei (Hebrew: הָרָן – Hārān) was a Levite who lived in the time of David and Solomon (1 Chronicles 23:1–9).
