= Nahor, son of Terah =

Biblical character, son of Terah

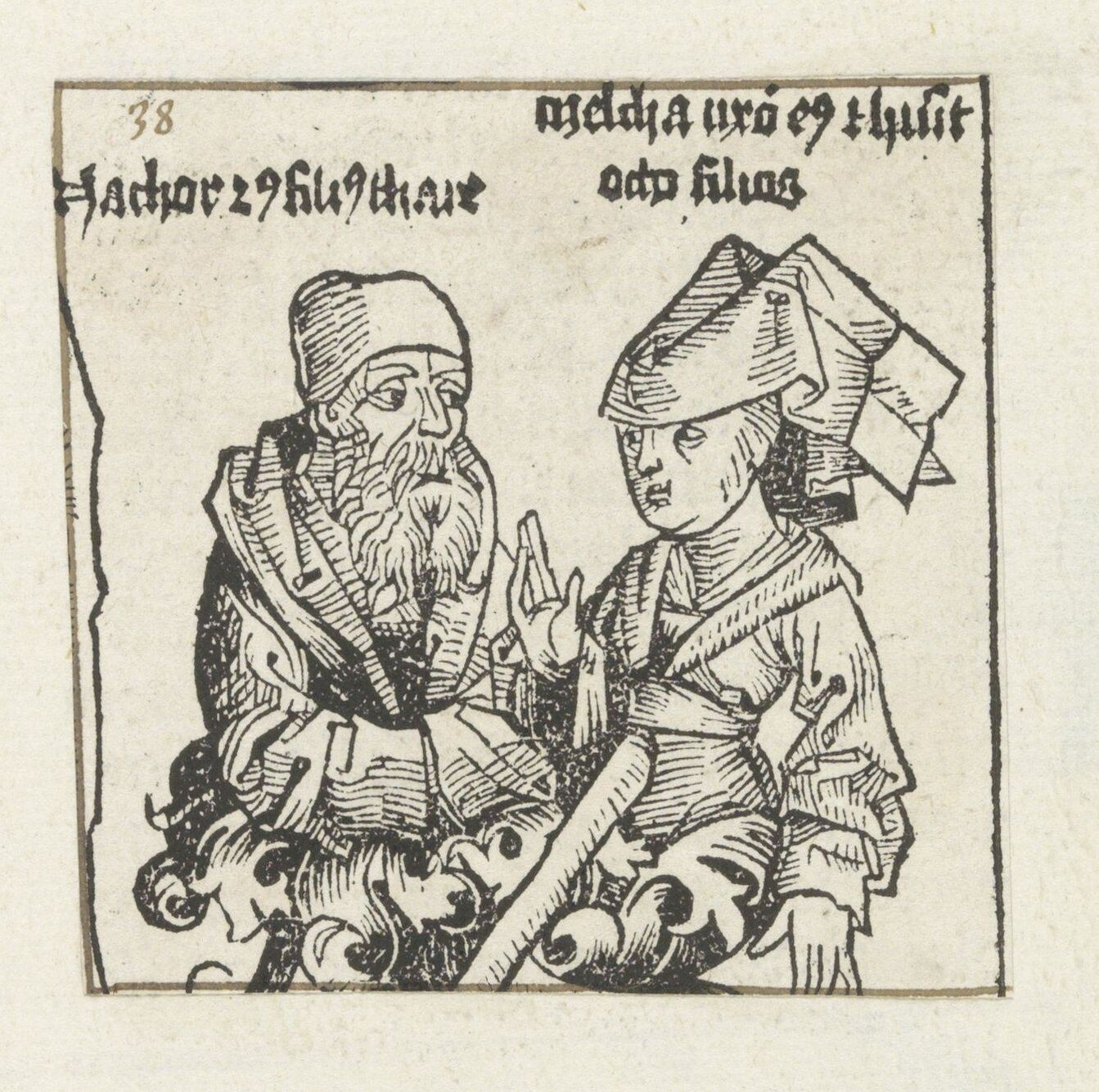
- Nahor and his wife Milcah from Hartmann Schedel's Nuremberg Chronicles
- Born: unknown Ur Kaśdim, Kaldea, Sumer (present-day southern Iraq)
- Died: unknown Haran (present-day southeastern Turkey)
- Spouses: Milcah, Reumah (concubine)
- Children: Uz, Buz, Kemuel, Kesed, Hazo, Pildash, Jidlaph, Bethuel, Tebah, Gaham, Tahash, Maacah
- Parent: Terah (father)
- Relatives: Abraham (brother); Haran (brother); Lot (nephew); Milcah (niece); Iscah (niece); Nahor (paternal grandfather)

In the account of Terah's family mentioned in the Book of Genesis (Genesis 11:26–32), Nahor (Hebrew: נָחוֹר – Nāḥōr), also spelled Nachor, is listed as the son of Terah, amongst two other brothers, Abram and Haran (v.26,27). His grandfather was Nahor I, son of Serug. Nahor married the daughter of his brother Haran, Milcah, his niece (v.29). They may all have been born and raised in the city of Ur: the biblical account states that "Haran died before his father Terah in the land of his birth, in Ur of the Chaldeans" (Genesis 11:28).

== Narrative in the Book of Genesis ==
When Abram had an encounter with God, this brother directed his family to leave their native land and go to the land of Canaan. Terah, their father, coordinated the gathering of his family to journey west to their destination (Genesis 11:31). They followed the Euphrates River, with their herds, to the Paddan Aram region. This was about halfway along the Fertile Crescent between Mesopotamia and the Mediterranean, in what is now southeastern Turkey. In this region, Nahor and his family settled except for his brother Haran, who had died sometime ago back in Ur (v.28). The city where they settled, Harran, is the place where Nahor's father would die (Genesis 11:32).

Nahor II continued his own travels and settled in the region of Aram Naharaim, where he founded the town of Nahor (Gen.24:10). Here, he and Milcah had eight sons (Genesis 22:20–23):

1. Uz, the firstborn
2. Buz
3. Kemuel
4. Kesed
5. Hazo
6. Pildash
7. Jidlaph
8. Bethuel, father of Rebekah, the wife of Isaac

Nahor and his concubine, Reumah, also had four sons: Tebah, Gaham, Tahash, and Maacah (Genesis 22:24), giving him twelve sons in total.

== In the Book of Joshua ==
In his final speech to the Israelite leaders assembled at Shechem, Joshua recounts the history of God's formation of the Israelite nation, beginning with "Terah the father of Abraham and Nachor, [who] lived beyond the Euphrates River and worshiped other gods" (Joshua 24:2).

== In popular culture ==
Nahor is portrayed by Kevin McNally in the film Abraham (1993). The character of Nahor's concubine Reumah is portrayed by Evelina Meghangi in the same film.

== See also ==
- Harran, the city where the family first settled (spelled differently in Hebrew from the family name of Haran).
