= Milcah =

Biblical character

- Born: Ur Kaśdim, Kaldea, Sumer (present-day southern Iraq)
- Other name: Milkāh
- Spouse: Nahor
- Parent: Haran
- Relatives: Lot (brother), Iscah (sister), Abraham (uncle), Nahor (uncle)

Milcah (Hebrew: מִלְכָּה, romanized: Mīlkā, related to the Hebrew word for "queen") was the daughter of Haran and the wife of Nahor, according to the genealogies of Genesis. She is identified as the mother of Bethuel and grandmother of Rebecca and Laban in biblical tradition, and some texts of the Midrash have identified her as Sarah's sister.

== Sister of Sarah ==
One of the Yahwist (contested) passages from Genesis identifies Haran as the father of Iscah and Milcah. Some rabbinic texts within the Midrashic tradition have identified the aforementioned Iscah as Sarah. According to the Babylonian Talmud, Rabbi Isaac Nappaha, who was one of the Israeli rabbis, said that Iscah and Sarah were the same person: "And why was she called Iscah? Because she saw through the Holy Spirit".

== Ancestor of Rebecca ==
She is identified as the grandmother of Rebecca in the Book of Genesis, but some scholars believe that Milcah may have originally been Rebecca's mother. They have argued that Bethuel, who is identified as Rebecca's father by the priestly source, was a later addition to the text, and that Rebecca was the daughter of Milcah and Nahor.

According to Bible in the book of Genesis 24:15, Milcah is the Grandmother of Rebecca and her father is Bethuel.

== Marriage to Nahor and descendants ==
According to Genesis Chapter 22, Milcah and Nahor have eight children: Uz, Buz, Kemuel, Chesed, Hazo, Pildash, Jidlaph, and Bethuel. Targum Jonathan says that Providence granted Milcah conception in the merit of her sister Sarah. Milcah's son Bethuel moves to Padan-aram (also called Aram-Naharaim) and fathers Rebekah. Milcah's granddaughter Rebekah eventually marries Milcah's cousin Isaac and gave birth to Jacob who became Israel. There is a midrash that Milcah was the forebear of all prophets in the non-Jewish world.

== Incest ==
Ibn Ezra wrote in his commentary on Gen. 11:29 that Haran, Milcah's father, was a different person from Haran, Abraham's brother. Milcah was married to Nahor, who was also a brother of Abraham. Under Ibn Ezra's interpretation Milcah's husband was not also her uncle.

In the Babylonian Talmud, Rabbi Isaac presumes that the two men with the name Haran are one person. If that is true, then Milcah married to her uncle. Although Leviticus would later outlaw marriages between aunt and nephew (Lev. 18:14, 20:19), it did not rule out marriage between uncle and niece. (See, e.g., Gunther Plaut, The Torah: a Modern Commentary, 881. New York: UAHC, 1981.) The Talmud approved of a man who married his sister's daughter. (Yevamot 62b-63a.) And in the Talmud, Rabbi Isaac equates Milcah's sister Iscah with Sarah (then Sarai), in which case Abraham would have married his brother Haran's daughter.

== See also ==
- Bethuel
- Chayei Sarah
- Genesis
- Tanakh
- Hebrew Bible
