= Paddan Aram =

Biblical region

Paddan Aram or Padan-aram (Hebrew: פַדַּן אֲרָם, romanized: Paddan ʾĂrām) was a biblical region referring to the northern plain of Aram-Naharaim. Paddan Aram in Aramaic means the field of Aram, a name that distinguishes the flatland from the mountainous regions to the north and east. In the Book of Genesis, Abraham, the patriarch of the Abrahamic religions, describes Aram as "my land" (Genesis 24:4).

== In the Hebrew Bible ==
Paddan Aram designates the area of Harran in upper Mesopotamia. "Paddan Aram" and "Haran" may be dialectical variations regarding the same locality as paddanū and harranū are synonyms for "road" or "caravan route" in Akkadian.

Padan-aram or Padan appears in 11 verses in the Hebrew Bible, all in Genesis. Adherents of the documentary hypothesis often attribute most of these verses to the priestly source and the remainder to a later redactor.

The city of Harran, where Abraham and his father Terah settled after leaving Ur of the Chaldees, while en route to Canaan, according to the Genesis 11:31, was located in Paddan Aram, that part of Aram-Naharaim "Aram between the Rivers" that lay along the Euphrates. Abraham's brother Nahor settled in the area. Abraham's nephew Bethuel, son of Nahor and Milcah, and father of Laban and Rebecca, lived in Padan-aram. Abraham sent his steward back there to find a wife among his kinfolk for his son, Isaac. The steward found Rebecca.

Isaac and Rebecca's son Jacob was sent there to avoid the wrath of his brother Esau. There Jacob worked for Laban, fathered eleven sons and daughter, Dinah, (Gen. 35:22–26; 46:15), and amassed livestock and wealth. (Gen. 31:18.) From there, Jacob went to Shechem and the Land of Israel, where his twelfth son was born to him. (Gen. 33:18.)

== In rabbinic interpretation ==
In the Midrash, Isaac bar Judah taught that the people of Padan-aram were rogues and Rebekah was like a lily among the thorns. (Genesis Rabbah 63:4 see also Leviticus Rabbah 23:1 (deceivers); Song of Songs Rabbah 2:4 (tricksters); Zohar, Bereshit 1:136b (wicked); Rashi to Gen. 25:20 (wicked).) Rabbi Isaac thus considered Rebecca's sojourn in Padan-aram as emblematic of Israel's among the nations. (Zohar, Bereshit 1:137a.)

== See also ==
- Padanaram Settlement, a modern community in Indiana named for Padan Aram.
- Padanaram, Massachusetts, a village in the town of Dartmouth, Massachusetts.
