= Iscah =

Female biblical figure

- Born: Ur Kaśdim, Kaldea, Sumer (present-day southern Iraq)
- Died: unknown
- Other names: Yiskāh, Iescha
- Parent: Haran
- Relatives: Lot (brother), Milcah (sister), Abraham (uncle), Nahor (uncle)

Iscah (Hebrew: יִסְכָּה Yīskā; Greek: Ἰεσχά, romanized: Iescha) is the daughter of Haran and the niece of Abraham in the Book of Genesis. The passage in which Iscah is mentioned is extremely brief. As a result rabbinical scholars have developed theories to explain it, typically adopting the claim that Iscah was an alternate name for Sarah (Sarai), the wife of Abraham, particularly that it denoted her role as a prophetess.

The Babylonian Talmud connects the name Iscah to an Aramaic verbal rooting, meaning "to see". It connects the name with prophetic foresight. Modern scholars are not convinced by the Talmud's explanation, and Iscah's etymology is currently regarded as uncertain.

"Iscah" may be the source of the name "Jessica", via a character in William Shakespeare's play The Merchant of Venice.

== Biblical text ==
The only reference to Iscah is in a brief passage in the Book of Genesis:

And Abram and Nahor took them wives: the name of Abram's wife [was] Sarai; and the name of Nahor's wife, Milcah, the daughter of Haran, the father of Milcah, and the father of Iscah. — Genesis 11:29 KJV

== Rabbinical interpretation ==
Since Haran is described as the father of both Iscah and Milcah, Rabbinical scholars concluded that Iscah was another name or title for Sarai. This was formulated in the Targum Pseudo-Yonathan. Howard Schwartz explains:

The difficult genealogy of Abraham and Sarah in Genesis 11:29 led to confusion as to the identity of Iscah. The resolution found in Targum Pseudo-Yonathan, the Talmud, and other rabbinic sources is that Sarah was Iscah, and that Iscah was a seer. This meaning is derived from the Aramaic root of Iscah, which denotes seeing. This led to the tradition that Sarah was a prophetess as great or greater than Abraham. The implication is that Iscah is a kind of alter ego for Sarah, and that when she turned to her prophetic side, she became Iscah.

Rabbi Isaac commented "Iscah was Sarah, and why was she called Iscah? Because she foresaw the future by divine inspiration." Schwarz describes Iscah as an "extension of Sarah's personality beyond its normal bounds".

== Modern views ==
Historian Savina J. Teubal takes the view that the name of Iscah was probably included in the text of Genesis because Iscah represented an important genealogy:

Of Harran's descendants, Milcah and her sister Iscah are recorded by J, but Lot is not mentioned with them. The inclusion of Iscah must have had some significance that either J or his source chose not to elucidate. Nevertheless a strong tradition must have barred the redactors from omitting Iscah's name, a tradition, presumably, in which a sister had an important function; this tradition is apparent also in Genesis 4:22, in which Naamah, 64 sister of Tubal-Cain, is mentioned only by name. It can be surmised that Naamah and Iscah were originally recorded to categorize the descent group (or other characteristic) of their siblings Tubal-Cain and Milcah. In non- patriarchal terms, Naamah and Tubal-Cain were uterine siblings, as were Milcah and Iscah. It is also possible that Milcah is named before her sister Iscah because she was younger, just as Rachel is named before Leah. Among Harran's descendants, the sequence of Lot's birth is not significant and is not mentioned in the genealogy of J because he was not the uterine sibling of Milcah and Iscah, did not belong to the same descent group as they, and was therefore not considered by Sarah or Abram as heir.

== Jessica ==
The name "Jessica" comes from a character in Shakespeare's play The Merchant of Venice, the daughter of Shylock. Iscah may have been rendered "Jeska" in some English Bibles available in Shakespeare's day. The Tyndale Bible has "Iisca" as does the Coverdale Bible, the Geneva Bible has "Iscah", and the earlier Wycliffe Bible has "Jescha". The Matthew Bible (1537) has "Iesca".
