= Haran (disambiguation) =

Haran may refer to:

== Places ==
- Haran, Azerbaijan
- Haran, Iran (disambiguation)
- Harran, an ancient city in Upper Mesopotamia
- Harran in the Bible (Hebrew: חָרָן, Ḥārān), a place in the Bible

== People ==
Haran (Hebrew: הָרָן), the name of three different men mentioned in the Hebrew Bible

== People (surname) ==
- Brady Haran (born 1976), Australian independent film-maker and video journalist
- Cyril Haran (1931–2014), Gaelic footballer and manager, priest, scholar and schoolteacher
- John Haran (born 1976), Gaelic footballer
- K. Haran (Haran Kaveri, born 1989), composer of film scores and sound tracks in Malaysian Tamil cinema
- Mary Cleere Haran (1952–2011), American cabaret singer.
- Tadhg Haran (born 1991), Irish hurler
- Elizabeth Haran (born 1954), Australian-Zimbabwean writer

== Other ==
- 葉蘭 (haran), a Japanese name for Aspidistra elatior, a plant leaf used in bento boxes
- HaRaN, an acronym for the Talmudic scholar Nissim of Gerona

== See also ==
- Harran (disambiguation)
