= Azar (Quranic figure) =

Legal guardian of Abraham in Islam

- ءَازَرَ
- Born: Azar ibn Nahur ibn Saruh ibn Ra'u ibn Falakh; Ur al-Chaldees, Bilād ar-Rāfidayn
- Died: Unknown (Note: Presumably after Isma'il and Ishaq were already born); Bilād ar-Rāfidayn
- Occupation: Idol-sculptor
- Children: Ibrāhīm al-Khalīlullāh (biological or adopted son)
- Father: Nahur ibn Saruh
- Relatives: Lut ibn Haran (grandson or grandnephew); Isma'il ibn Ibrahim (grandson or grandnephew); Ishaq ibn Ibrahim (grandson or grandnephew)

Azar ibn Nahur ibn Saruh ibn Ra'u ibn Falakh ibn Hud (Note: Assuming Hud is the same as the biblical Eber) (Arabic: ءَازَرَ, romanized: ʿĀzara) was a Mesopotamian idol-sculptor and the legal guardian of Abraham according to the Quran. Many Sunni and Shia scholars argue over whether Azar was the father or paternal uncle of Abraham. He was a descendant of Noah, through Shem.

== Etymology ==
Western and classical scholars observe that the Hebrew name Terah (or Tharra) was corrupted or changed into forms like Athar or Atar in Greek and Syriac translations in early Christian patristic and historical literature, such as the Historia Ecclesiastica by the fourth-century bishop Eusebius. Some historians argue that this warped variant—Athar/Azar—passed phonetically into early regional usage and into the pre-Islamic or early Arabic context.

The name "Azar" itself is believed by early Islamic exegetes to be related to the Arabic root word A-Z-R (أ - ز - ر), meaning "strength."

== In the Quran ==
Azar was an idolater and well-known idol-sculptor in Ur of the Chaldees, Mesopotamia. Azar would send his son, (Note: Or nephew) Ibrahim, to sell the idols that he sculpted in the marketplace, despite Ibrahim's opposition to idolatry. During one of the many festivals that would take place in the city, the people would gather in their temple and place offerings of food before their idols. Ur's most prominent temple is the Great Ziggurat, which can be seen today. Ibrahim would ask them and Azar, "What are these statues to which you are so devoted?" The people would reply, "We found our forefathers worshipping them." Ibrahim responded "Indeed, you and your forefathers have been clearly astray." The people would reply, "Have you come to us with the truth, or is this a joke?" Ibrahim declared, "In fact, your Lord is the Lord of the heavens and the earth, Who created them [both]. And to that I bear witness." Azar and the people would reject this call to monotheism from Ibrahim and would continue worshipping idols.

After surviving being burnt alive in a huge fire, (Note: Maryam 19:49 says "So after he had left them and what they worshipped besides Allah, We granted him Isaac and Jacob, and made each of them a prophet." Implying that this conversation took place after Ibrahim survived the fire.) Ibrahim would approach Azar again and call him to Islam, saying, "O my dear father! Why do you worship what can neither hear nor see, nor benefit you at all? O my dear father! I have certainly received some knowledge which you have not received, so follow me and I will guide you to the Straight Path! O my dear father! Do not worship Satan. Surely Satan is ever rebellious against the Most Compassionate. O my dear father! I truly fear that you will be touched by a torment from the Most Compassionate, and become Satan’s companion [in Hell]." To Ibrahim's surprise, Azar would respond by not just rejecting the message, but also threatening to stone Ibrahim to death and disowning him, saying, "How dare you reject my idols, O Ibrahim! If you do not desist, I will certainly stone you [to death]. So be gone from me forever!" Ibrahim responded, "Peace be upon you! I will pray to my Lord for your forgiveness. He has truly been Most Gracious to me. As I distance myself from [all of] you and from whatever you invoke besides Allah, I will [continue to] call upon my Lord [alone], trusting that I will never be disappointed in invoking my Lord." Ibrahim proceeded to leave the entire region to migrate to Ash-Sham, never to see his father, Azar, again. Despite this, Ibrahim continued to seek forgiveness for Azar even after migrating to Ash-Sham and even after the birth of his sons, Isma'il and Ishaq, only stopping when he realized that Azar died an idolater.

== In Hadith ==
According to a narration from Abu Hurayra in Sahih al-Bukhari;

The Prophet (ﷺ) said, "On the Day of Resurrection Abraham will meet his father Azar whose face will be dark and covered with dust.(The Prophet (ﷺ) Abraham will say to him): 'Didn't I tell you not to disobey me?' His father will reply: 'Today I will not disobey you.' 'Abraham will say: 'O Lord! You promised me not to disgrace me on the Day of Resurrection; and what will be more disgraceful to me than cursing and dishonoring my father?' Then Allah will say (to him):' 'I have forbidden Paradise for the disbelievers." Then he will be addressed, 'O Abraham! Look! What is underneath your feet?' He will look and there he will see a Dhabh (an animal,) blood-stained, which will be caught by the legs and thrown in the (Hell) Fire."

— Sahih al-Bukhari 3350
