= Lot in Islam =

One of the prophets in Islam

Prophet Lūṭ Alayhi as-Salam
- لوط; Lot
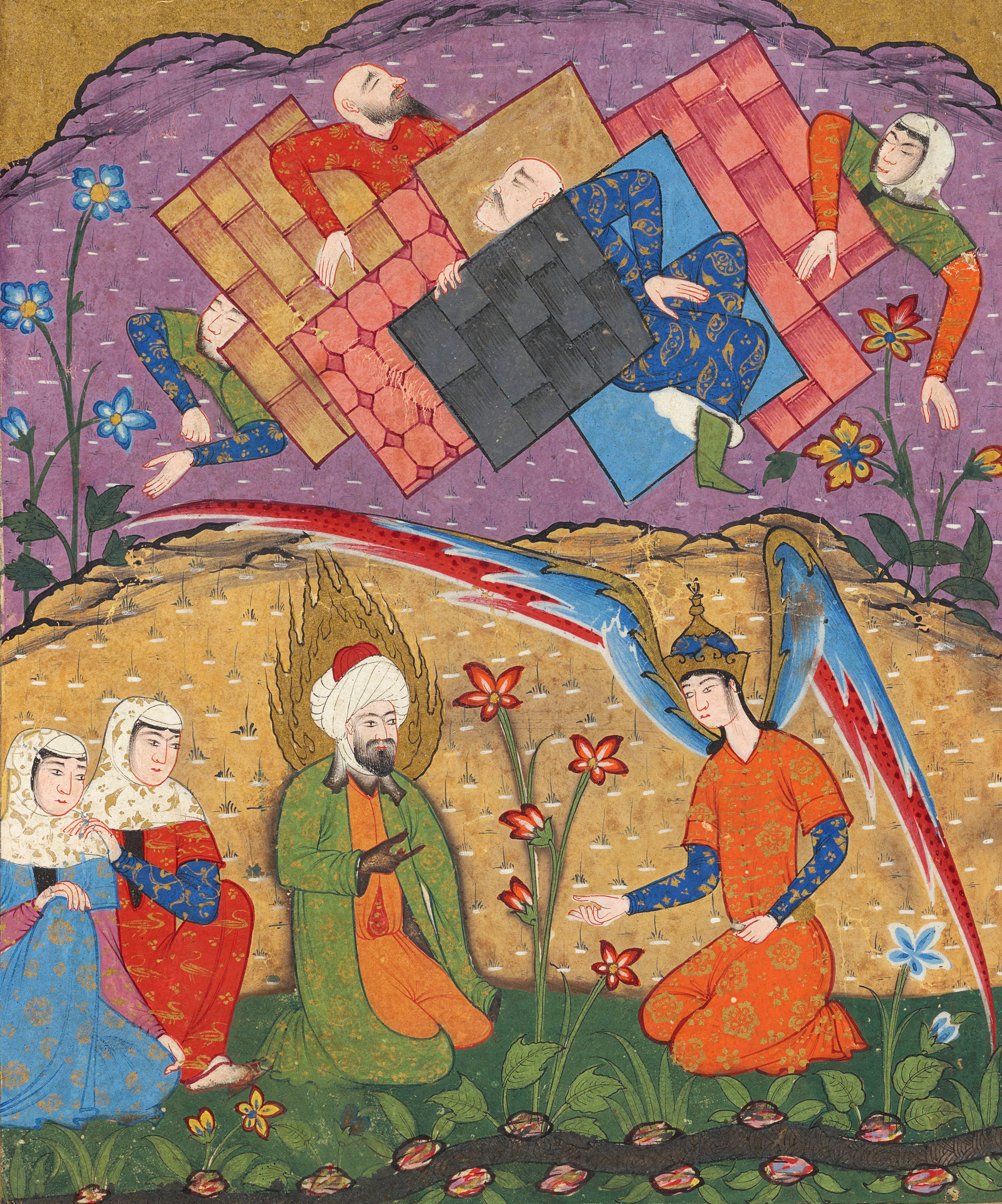
- Lut and his daughters sit in conversation with the angel Jibril while the background is littered with the ruins of the towns and corpses of their inhabitants.

Prophet of Islam
- Preceded by: Ibrahim
- Succeeded by: Ismail

Personal life
- Born: Lut ibn Haran Ur Kasdim (Note: Assuming Lut is identical with Lot.)
- Died: Bani Na'im
- Children: Lot's daughters
- Parent: Haran
- Relatives: Ibrāhīm (uncle); Ismā’īl (cousin); Ishāq (cousin)

Religious life
- Religion: Islam

Lut (Arabic: لوط, romanized: Lūṭ, [luːtˁ]) is a prophet and messenger of God who was mentioned in the Quran. According to Islamic tradition, Lut was born to Haran and spent his younger years in Ur, later migrating to Canaan with his uncle Abraham. He was sent to the cities of Sodom and Gomorrah as a prophet, and was commanded to preach to their inhabitants on monotheism.

Though Lut was not born among the people he'd been sent to preach to, the people of Sodom are still regarded as his "brethren" (Arabic: إِخْوَٰن, romanized: ikhwān) in the Quran. Like the Biblical narrative, the Quran states that Lut's messages were ignored by the inhabitants of the cities, and Sodom and Gomorrah were subsequently destroyed. The destruction of the cities is traditionally presented as a warning against homosexuality in Islam as well as other things.

While the Quran does not elaborate upon Lut's later life, Islam holds that all prophets were examples of moral and spiritual 'righteousness'.

== Family ==
Muslim tradition is debated about who Abraham's father is. Some maintain that his father was Terah and his uncle was Azar (Arabic: آزر, romanized: Āzar), which could be derived from the Syriac Athar. Other's believe that Azar was Abraham's father and the same person as Terah. Abraham had two children, Isaac and Ismael, who both later became prophets. Abraham's nephew is said to have been the prophet Lut, who was one of the other people who migrated with Abraham out of their community. Abraham himself is said to have been a descendant of Nuh through his son Shem.

== Quranic narrative ==
The Quran states that one day, a group of angels visited Abraham as guests in the guise of men in order to inform him of the fact that his wife Sarah was pregnant with Isaac. While there, they also told him that they had been sent by God to the "guilty people" of Lut to destroy them with "a shower of stones of clay". Lut and those who believed in him, were to be spared, but his wife was to die in the destruction, with the angels stating that "she is of those who lag behind". The Quran also draws upon Lut's wife as an "example for the unbelievers" as she was married to a righteous man but refused to believe in his message and was thus condemned to Hell.

The people of the twin cities transgressed against the bounds of God. According to the Quran, their sins included inhospitality and robbery. They hated strangers and robbed travellers, apart from other abuses and rape. It was their sin of sexual misconduct as well which was seen as particularly egregious, with Lut strongly chiding them for approaching men with sexual desire instead of women. Lut told and tried to help them to abandon their sinful ways, but they ridiculed him and threatened to evict him from the cities. Lut prayed to God and begged to be saved from the consequences of their sinful acts.

Then three angels, disguised as handsome men, came to Lut as guests. He grieved the men, as he felt powerlessness to protect them from the people of the cities. The cities' residents becoming aware of the visitors demanded that Lut surrender his guests to them. Distressed and fearful that they would incur the wrath of God, suggested rather lawful marriage to his daughters as pious and purer alternatives to their unlawful wishes, and perhaps as a source of guidance. But they were unrelenting and replied "You certainly know that we have no need for your daughters. You already know what we desire!", referring to his male guests.

The exegetes Ibn Kathir, Al-Qurtubi and Al-Tabari do not read 'daughters' to mean Lut's literal daughters. They argue that since a prophet is like a father to his nation, Lut was directing the evildoers to turn away from their sins and engage in healthy and pious relationships with the daughters of the nation, i.e. women in general.

The angels then revealed their true identities to Lut and said to him, “Indeed, we will save you and your family, except your wife; she is to be of those who remain behind". They advised Lut to leave the cities during the night, telling him not to look back. Keeping his faith in God, Lut left the cities in the darkness of night, bringing with him his followers and believing family members. Finally, morning came, and the Decree of God passed whereupon the Quran reads, “When Our command came, We turned the cities upside down and rained down on them clustered stones of baked clay," And thus was sealed the fate of the twin cities, falling into destruction and despair and marking the end of the civilizations of Sodom and Gomorrah.

== Other mentions in the Quran ==
Lut is referenced a relatively large number of times in the Quran. Many of these passages place the narrative of Lut in a line of successive prophets including Noah, Hud, Salih and Shuayb. Islamic scholars have stated that these particular prophets represent the early cycle of prophecy as described in the Quran. These narratives typically follow similar patterns: a prophet is sent to a community; the community pays no heed to his warnings but instead threatens him with punishment; God asks the prophet to leave with his followers and the community and its people are subsequently destroyed in a punishment. Elsewhere in the Quran, Lut is mentioned alongside Ismael, Elisha and Jonah as men whom God favored above the nations (Arabic: ٱلْعَـٰلَمِينَ, romanized: al-'aalameen, lit. 'the worlds').

== Homosexuality ==
Many schools of Islamic jurisprudence state that homosexual sex is a sin, based in part on the story of Lut. Because the Quran states that Lut berated his people for sexually pursuing men, in addition to attempting to assault strangers, the incident is traditionally seen as demonstrating Islam's disapproval of both rape and homosexuality. Lut's struggle with the people of the twin cities is seen as either concerning homosexuality in general or specifically homosexual anal sex. These interpretations have sometimes widened to condemn homosexuality beyond the physical act, including psychological and social dispositions.

== Monument ==
Many Muslims believe that Bani Na'im (Arabic: بني نعيم, romanized: Banī Naʾīm, lit. 'children of bliss') in Palestine houses the tomb of Lut in the center of the town. The tomb is located within a rectangular mosque with an inner court and minaret. The lintel of the mosque's northern gate is built from stones dating to the Byzantine era when a church had possibly stood at the site. Bani Na'im's association with Lut predates Islam, as the works of the Catholic scholar Jerome in the 4th century CE state that the tomb is located in a town named Capharbaricha, which is likely the former name of Bani Na'im.

Tradition holds that the tomb of his daughters is located on a nearby hill. To the southeast of Bani Na'im is a shrine dedicated to Lut, known as Maqam an-Nabi Yaqin (Arabic: مقام النبي يقين, lit. 'Shrine of the Truthful Prophet'). Local legend claims Lut prayed at the site and that the imprints of his feet are still visible in a rock there. Similar alleged footprints of prophets and other holy men are found at Islamic shrines throughout the Middle East.

== See also ==
- Biblical narratives and the Quran
- Legends and the Quran
- Muhammad in Islam
- Stories of the Prophets
