= Harran (disambiguation) =

Harran may refer to:

== Places ==
- Harran (biblical place), an ancient city in Upper Mesopotamia

=== Norway ===
- Harran, Norway, a village in Grong Municipality in Trøndelag county, Norway
- Harran Municipality, a former municipality in the old Nord-Trøndelag county, Norway

=== Syria ===
- Harran al-Awamid, a town in Rif Dimashq Governorate, southern Syria.
- Harran, Idlib, a village in Idlib Governorate, northern Syria
- Harran, as-Suwayda, an ancient village in Shahba District, As-Suwayda Governorate, southwestern Syria

=== Turkey ===
- Harran, a major ancient city in Upper Mesopotamia (in present-day Turkey)

=== Yemen ===
- Harran, Yemen, a village in west central Yemen

== Other ==
- Battle of Harran, a battle in 1104 between crusader states Antioch and Edessa
- Harran Sulci, a region on Saturn's moon, Enceladus
- Harran University, a university in Şanlıurfa, Turkey
- Harran Zureikat, American football player
- Fall of Harran, the Babylonian siege and capture of Harran in 608 BC
- Harran, the fictional city-state that serves as the setting for the survival horror video game Dying Light.

== See also ==
- Haran (Hebrew: הָרָן), the name of three different men mentioned in the Hebrew Bible
