= Abraham in Islam =

Islamic view of Abraham

Prophet ʾIbrāhīm
- إِبْرَاهِيْمُ Abraham
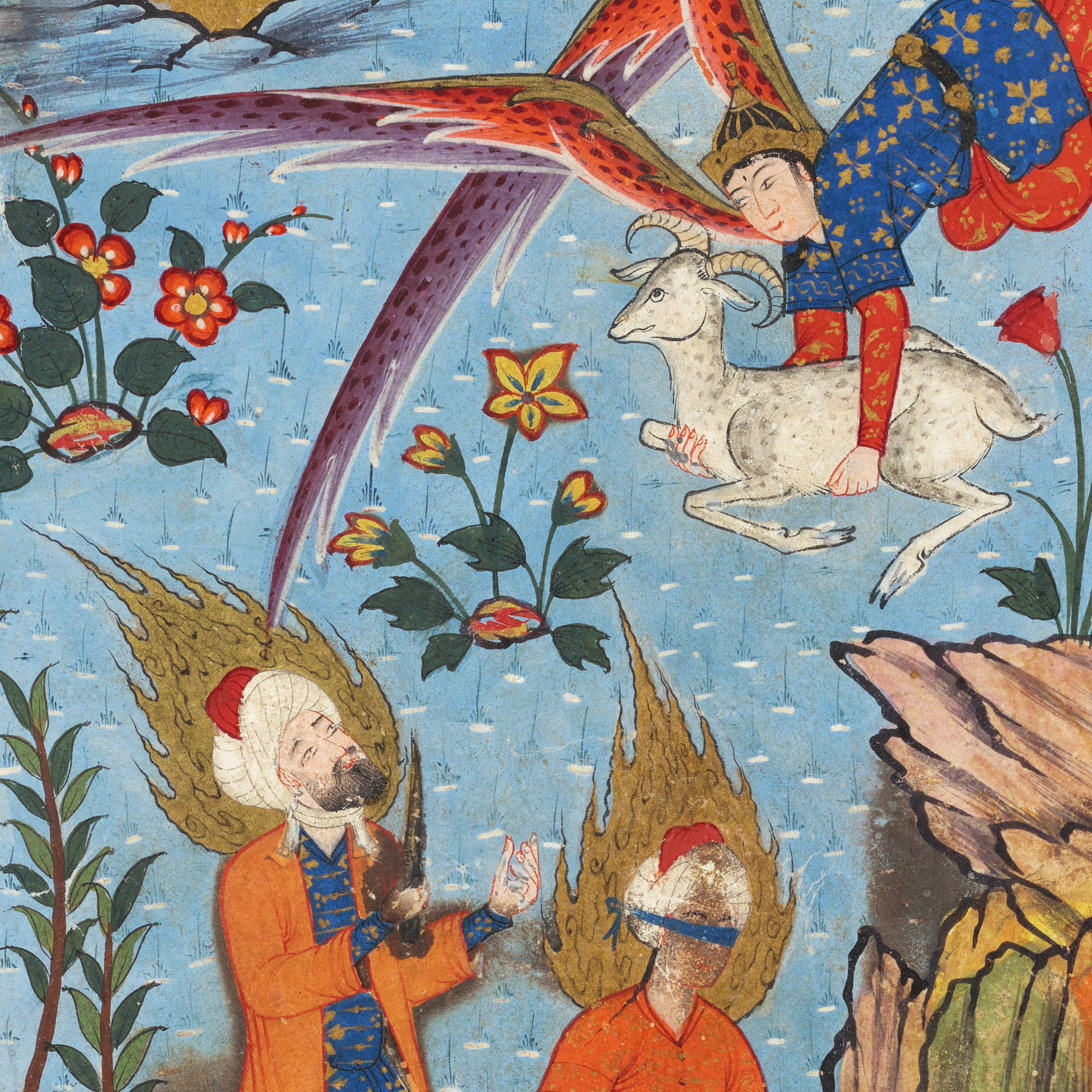
- Ibrahim's sacrifice of his son, Ismail, is stopped by Jibril delivering a sheep.

Prophet of Islam
- Preceded by: Salih
- Succeeded by: Lut

Personal life
- Born: 1996 BCE Ur al-Chaldees, Bilād ar-Rāfidayn
- Died: 1821 BCE (aged 175) Hebron, Shaam
- Resting place: Ibrahimi Mosque, Hebron
- Spouse: Hajar (Hagar), Sarah, Keturah
- Children: Isma'il (Ishmael), Isḥaq (Isaac)
- Parent(s): Tarakh; Mahalath (mother)
- Known for: Being an ancestor of the Ishmaelites and the Israelites; Building the Kaaba
- Other name: Khalīlullāh (Friend of God)
- Relatives: Lut (nephew)

Religious life
- Religion: Islam

Abraham in Islam, known as Ibrahim, (Note: Arabic: إِبْرَاهِيْمُ, romanized: ʾIbrāhīm; Arabic pronunciation: [ʔɪbraːˈhiːm]; the name appears in early Quranic manuscripts in two different spellings, either أبرهَم (Abraham) or إبرهيم (Ibrahīm)) is a prophet and messenger of God and is the ancestor to the Ishmaelite Arabs and Israelite Hebrews. Abraham plays a prominent role as an example of faith in Judaism, Christianity, and Islam. In Islam, Abraham fulfilled all the commandments and trials wherein God nurtured him throughout his lifetime. As a result of his unwavering faith in God, Abraham was promised by God to be a leader to all the nations of the world. The Quran extols Abraham as a model, an exemplar, obedient and not an idolater. In this sense, Abraham has been described as representing "primordial man in universal surrender to the Divine Reality before its fragmentation into religions separated from each other by differences in form". Muslims believe that the Kaaba in Mecca was built by Abraham and his son Ishmael as the first house of worship on earth. The Islamic holy day 'Eid ul-Adha is celebrated in commemoration of Abraham's willingness to sacrifice his son on God's command, as well as the end of the Hajj pilgrimage to the Kaaba.

Muslims believe that Abraham became the leader of the righteous in his time and that it was through him that Ishmaelites and Israelites came. Abraham, in the belief of Islam, was instrumental in cleansing the world of idolatry at the time. Paganism was cleared out by Abraham in both the Arabian Peninsula and Canaan. He spiritually purified both places as well as physically sanctifying the houses of worship. Abraham and Isma'il (Ishmael) further established the rites of pilgrimage (Ḥajj), which are followed by Muslims today. Muslims maintain that Abraham further asked God to bless both the lines of his progeny, of Isma'il and Isḥaq (Isaac), and to keep all of his descendants in the protection of God.

== In the Quran ==
The Quran repeatedly establishes Abraham's role as patriarch and mentions numerous important descendants who came through his lineage, including Isaac, Jacob and Ishmael. In the later chapters of the Quran, Abraham's role becomes yet more prominent. The Quran mentions that Abraham and Ishmael were the reformers who set up the Ka‘bah in Mecca as a center of pilgrimage for monotheism The Quran consistently refers to Islam as "the Religion of Abraham" (millat Ibrahim) and Abraham is given a title as Hanif (The Pure, "true in Faith" or "upright man"). The Quran also mentions Abraham as one whom God took as a friend (Khalil), hence Abraham's title in Islam, Khalil-Allah (Friend of God). The term is considered by some to be a derivation of the patriarch's title, Qal El. Other instances in the Quran which are described in a concise manner are the rescue of Abraham from the fire into which he was thrown by his people'; his pleading for his father; his quarrel with an unrighteous and powerful king and the miracle of the dead birds.

All these events and more have been discussed with more details in Muslim tradition, and especially in the Stories of the Prophets and works of universal Islamic theology. Certain episodes from the life of Abraham have been more heavily detailed in Islamic text, such as the arguments between Abraham and the evil king, Nimrod, the near-sacrifice of his son, and the story of Hagar and Ishmael, which Muslims commemorate when performing pilgrimage in Mecca. An important Islamic religious holiday, Eid al-Adha, commemorates Abraham's willingness to sacrifice his son Ishmael as an act of obedience to God, before God intervened to provide him with a sheep to sacrifice instead. In some cases, some believe these legends in Islamic text may have influenced later Jewish tradition.

== Biography in Islamic scripture ==
=== Youth ===
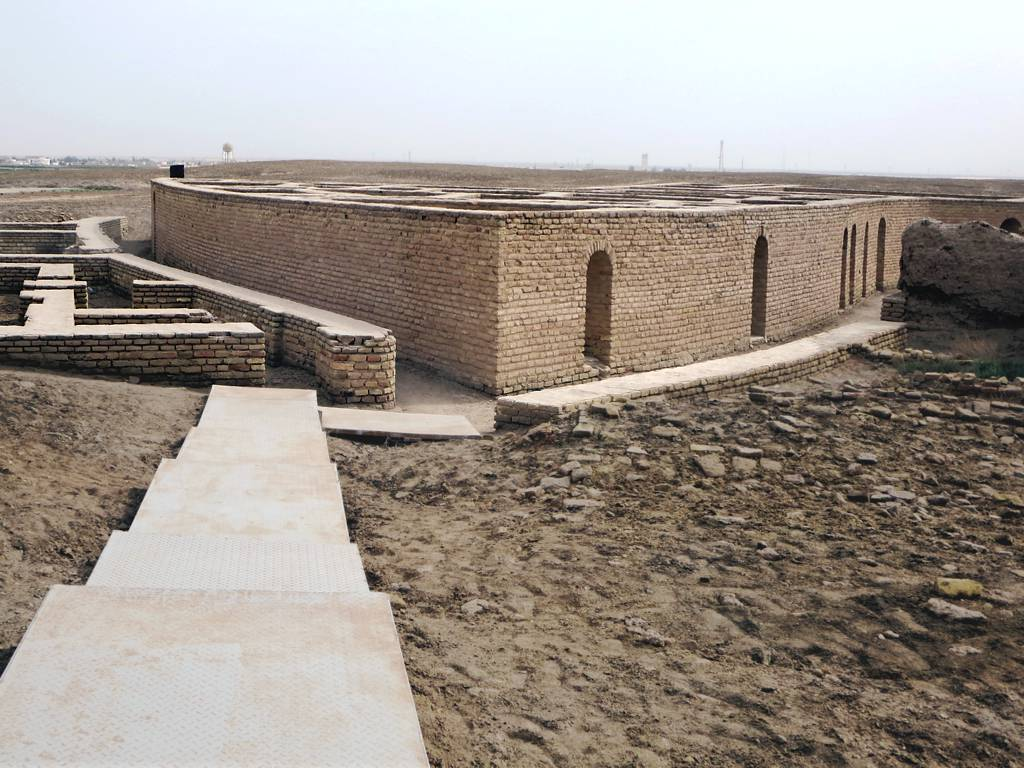
Ruins in the ancient Iraqi city of Ur, 2016, where Ibrahim is thought to have been born, and are thus named "Abraham's House" (30°57′42.75″N 46°06′21.3″E)

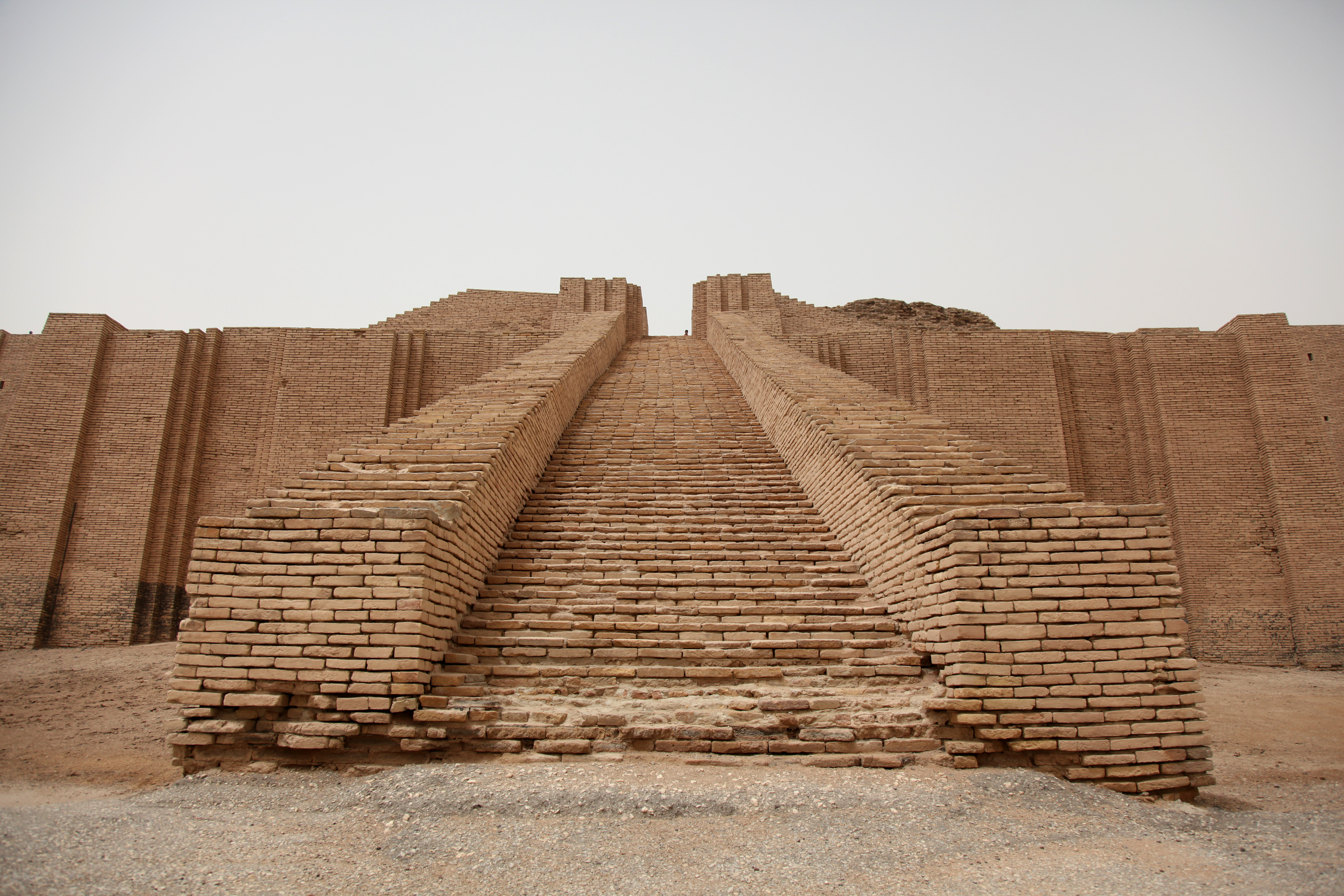
The Ziggurat of Ur, in 2010.

Ibrahim was born in a house of idolaters in the ancient city of Ur of the Chaldees, likely the place called 'Ur' in present-day Iraq, in which case, the idolaters would have been practitioners of the hypothesized Ancient Mesopotamian religion. His father Azar was a well-known idol-sculptor that his people worshiped. As a young child, Ibrahim used to watch his father sculpting these idols from stones or wood. When his father was finished with them, Ibrahim would ask his father why they could not move or respond to any request and then would mock them; therefore, his father would always scold him for not following his ancestors' rituals and mocking their idols.

Despite his opposition to idolatry, his father Azar would still send Ibrahim to sell his idols in the marketplace. During one of the many festivals that would take place in the city, the people would gather in their temple and place offerings of food before their idols. Ur's most prominent temple is the Great Ziggurat, which can be seen today. Ibrahim would ask them, "What are you worshipping? Do these idols hear when you call them? Can they help you or hurt you?" The people would reply, "It is the way of our forefathers." Ibrahim declared "I am sick of your gods! Truly I am their enemy."

=== The great fire ===
The decision to have Abraham burned at the stake was affirmed by the temple priests and the king of Babylon, Nimrod. The news spread like fire in the kingdom and people were coming from all places to watch the execution. A huge pit was dug up and a large quantity of wood was piled up. Then the biggest fire people ever witnessed was lit. The flames were so high up in the sky that even the birds could not fly over it for fear of being burnt themselves. Ibrahim's hands and feet were chained, and he was put in a catapult, ready to be thrown in. During this time, Angel Gabriel came to him and said: "O Abraham! Is there anything you wish for?" Abraham could have asked to be saved from the fire or to be taken away, but Ibrahim replied, "God is sufficient for me, He is the best disposer of my affairs." The catapult was released and Ibrahim was thrown into the fire. God then gave an order to the fire, "O fire! Be coolness and safety for Ibrahim." A miracle occurred, the fire obeyed and burned only his chains. Abraham came out from it as if he was coming out from a garden, peaceful, his face illuminated, and not a trace of smoke on his clothes. People watched in shock and exclaimed: "Amazing! Abraham's God has saved him from the fire!"

=== Confrontation with Nimrod ===
The Quran discusses a very short conversation between an unrighteous ruler and Abraham. Although the king in the Quran is unnamed, and this fact has been recognized as being least important in the narrative, outside of the Quran, namely in some of the tafasir, this king has been suggested to be Nimrod. This Tafsir by Ibn Kathir, a 14th-century scholar, has many embellishments in the narrative like Nimrod claiming divinity for himself. The Tafsir describes Nimrod's quarrel with Ibrahim, how he (Nimrod) became extremely angry and in his 'utter disbelief and arrant rebellion' became a tyrant.

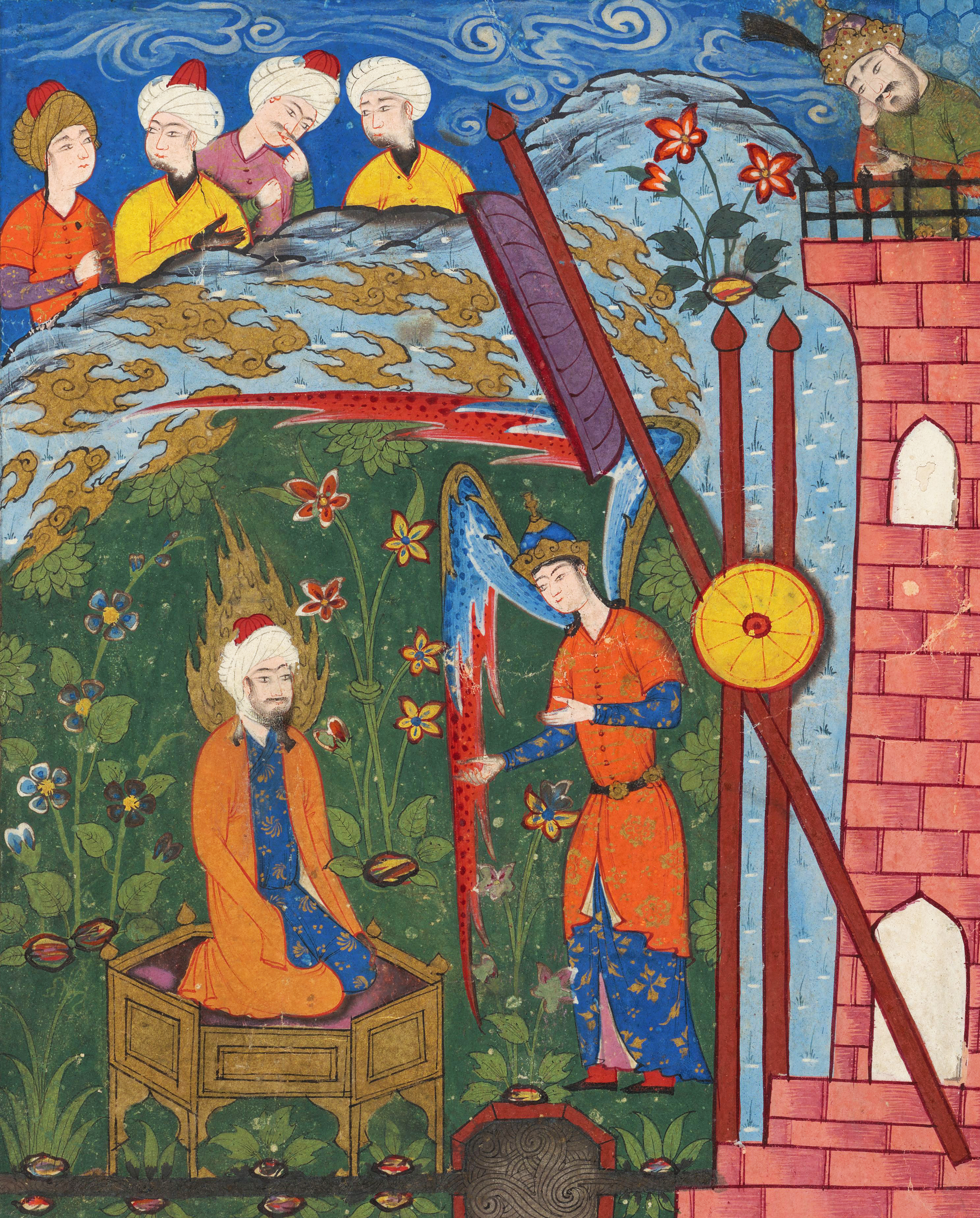
Illustration of Ibrahim being rescued from Nimrod's fire by the angel Jibril from a Persian 1577 manuscript.

According to Romano-Jewish historian Flavius Josephus, Nimrod was a man who set his will against that of God. Nimrod proclaimed himself as a living god and was worshipped as such by his subjects. Nimrod's consort Semiramis was also worshipped as a goddess at his side. Before Abraham was born, a portent in the stars tells Nimrod and his astrologers of the impending birth of Abraham, who would put an end to idolatry. Nimrod therefore orders the killing of all newborn babies. However, Abraham's mother escapes into the fields and gives birth secretly. Flavius Josephus mentions that Abraham confronts Nimrod and tells him face-to-face to cease his idolatry, whereupon Nimrod orders him burned at the stake. Nimrod has his subjects gather enough wood so as to burn Abraham in the biggest fire the world had ever seen. Yet when the fire is lit and Abraham is thrown into it, Abraham walks out unscathed. In Islam, it is debated whether the decision to have Ibrahim burned at the stake came from Nimrod and the temple priests or whether the people themselves became vigilantes and hatched the plan to have him burned at the stake. According to Muslim commentators, after Abraham survived the great fire, notoriety in society grew bigger after this event. Nimrod, who was the King of Babylon felt that his throne was in danger, and that he was losing power because upon witnessing Ibrahim coming out of the fire unharmed, a large part of society started believing in God and Abraham being a prophet of God. Up until this point, Nimrod was pretending that he himself was a god. Nimrod wanted to debate with him and show his people that he, the king is indeed the god and that Ibrahim was a liar. Nimrod asked Ibrahim, "What can your God do that I cannot?" Ibrahim replied, "My Lord is He who gives life and death." Nimrod then shouted, "I give life and death! I can bring a person from the street and have him executed, and I can grant my pardon to a person who was sentenced to death and save his life." Abraham replied, "Well, my lord God makes the sun rise from the East. Can you make it rise from the West?" Nimrod was confounded. He was beaten at his own game, on his own territory and in front of his own people. Abraham left him there speechless and went back to his mission of calling people to worship God.

This event has been noted as particularly important because, in the Muslim perspective, it almost foreshadowed the prophetic careers of future prophets, most significantly the career of Moses. Abraham's quarrel with the king has been interpreted by some to be a precursor to Moses's preaching to Pharaoh. Just as the ruler who argued against Abraham claimed divinity for himself, so did the Pharaoh of the Exodus, who refused to hear the call of Moses and perished in the Red Sea. In this particular incident, scholars have further commented on Abraham's wisdom in employing "rational, wise and target-oriented" speech, as opposed to pointless arguments.

Abraham, in the eyes of many Muslims, also symbolized the highest moral values essential to any person. The Qur'an details the account of the angels coming to Abraham to tell him of the birth of Ismael. It says that, as soon as Abraham saw the messengers, he "hastened to entertain them with a roasted calf." This action has been interpreted by all the scholars as exemplary; many scholars have commentated upon this one action, saying that it symbolizes Abraham's exceedingly high moral level and thus is a model for how men should act in a similar situation. This incident has only further heightened the "compassionate" character of Abraham in Muslim theology.

=== Sacrifice ===
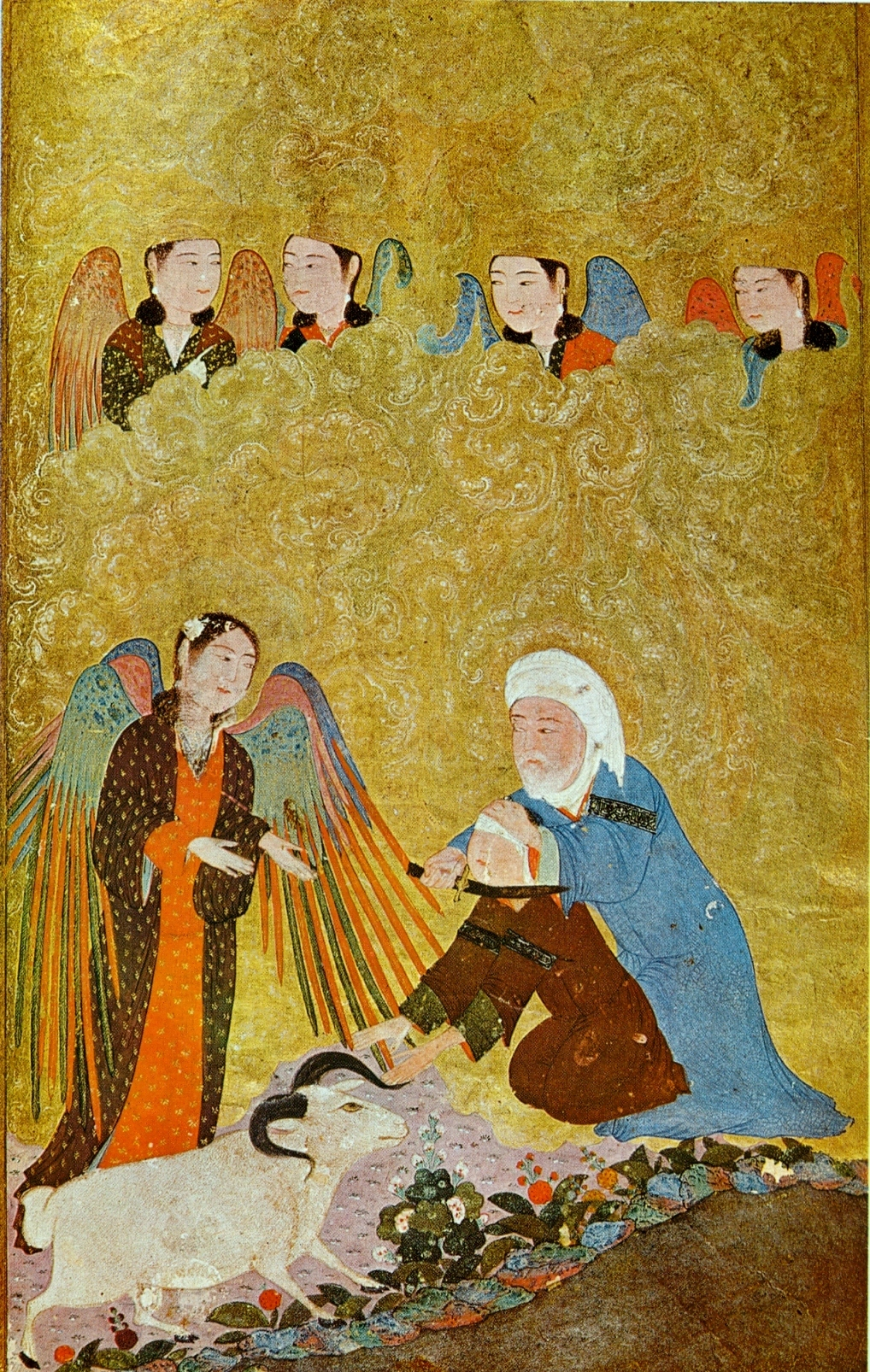
Ibrahim's Sacrifice; Timurid Anthology, 1410–1411

The classical Quranic exegete and historian Tabari offered two versions, whom Abraham was ordered to sacrifice. According to the first strand, Abraham wished for a righteous son, whereupon an angel appeared to him informing him, that he will get a righteous son, but when he was born and reached puberty, he must be sacrificed for God. Later, the angel appeared to Hagar to inform her about the upcoming child. When Ishmael was grown, someone appeared to Abraham, invites him to keep his vow.

When Ishmael was grown, someone appeared to Abraham in a dream and said to him: "Keep your vow which you made! God bestowed upon you a boy by Hagar so that you may sacrifice him" So he said to Ishmael: "Let us go offer a sacrifice to God!" So he took a knife and some rope and went with him until they reached a place in the mountains. The boy said to him: "Oh father! Where is your sacrifice?" He replied: "Oh my son, I saw in a dream, that I will slaughter you. So pay attention to what you see". He said, "Oh my father, do what you have been commanded; you will find me, Insha-Allah (if God wills), one of the patient". Ishmael then said to him: "Make tight my bonds, so that I will not struggle to pull back your clothes so that none of my blood will be shed on them for Hagar will see it and be grieved. Hurry! Pass the knife over my throat so that death will be easy for me. When you come to Hagar, greet her'. Abraham began to approach him and, while crying, tied him up. Ishmael too was crying such that the tears gathered by the cheek of Ishmael. He then drew the knife along his throat but the knife did not cut, for God had placed a sheet of copper on the throat of Ishmael. When he saw that, he turned him on his forehead and nicked him on the back of the head just as God has said in Quran 37:103: When they had both submitted and he flung on his forehead, that is they had submitted the affair to God. A voice called out: 'Abraham, you have fulfilled the vision!" He turned around and behold, there was a ram. He took it and released his son and he bent over his son saying: "Oh my son, today you have been given to me". That comes in God's saying in Quran 37:107: We ransomed him with a great sacrifice.

The second strand, provided by Tabari, states that Abraham was about to sacrifice his son Ishmael, and Iblis appeared in form of a man to prevent the sacrifice.

Iblis (Satan), who had taken on the form of a man, said: "Where are you going, O Shaikh?" He replied: " I am going to these mountains because I must do something there'. Iblis said: "By God, I have seen that Shaytan has come to you in a dream and ordered you to slaughter this little son of yours. And you intend to do that slaughtering!" Thereupon Abraham recognized him and said: "Get away from me, enemy of God! By God, I will most certainly continue to do what my Lord has commanded". Iblis, the enemy of God, gave up on Abraham but then he encountered Ishmael, who was behind Abraham carrying the wood and the large knife. He said to him: "O young man, do you realize where your father is taking you?" He said: "To gather wood for our family from the mountains". He replied: "By God, his actual intention is to sacrifice you!" He said: "Why?!" Iblis replied: "He claims that his Lord has ordered him to do so!" Ishmael replied: "He must do what his Lord commands, absolutely!" When the young man had rebuffed him, Iblis went to Hagar, the mother of Ishmael who was still at home. Iblis said to her: "Oh mother of Ishmael! Do you realize where Abraham is going with Ishmael?" She replied: "They have gone to gather wood for us in the mountains". He said: "He has actually gone in order to sacrifice him!" She replied: "It cannot be! He is too kind and too loving towards him to do that!" Iblis said: "He claims that God has ordered him to do that!" Hagar said: "If his Lord has ordered him to do that then he must submit to the command of God!" So the enemy of God returned exasperated at not being able to influence the family of Abraham as he wished.

This great sacrifice denotes the importance of the ram that replaced Ibrahim's son. Tafsir ibn Kathir records Ibn Abbas' explanation of the verse, according to Muhammad's teachings. The explanation is as follows:

"And We ransomed him with a great sacrifice" (37:107). It was reported that Ibn `Abbas (may God be pleased with him) said, "A ram which had grazed in Paradise for forty years."

— Tafsir Ibn Kathir 37:107

The Tafsir further goes on to say that the ram's horns were preserved until the time of Muhammad:

Imam Ahmad recorded that Safiyyah bint Shaybah said, "A woman from Bani Sulaym, who was the midwife of most of the people in our household, told me that the Messenger of God sent for `Uthman bin Talhah, may God be pleased with him.'' On one occasion she said, "I asked `Uthman, `Why did the Prophet call you' He said, `The Messenger of God said to me, I saw the horns of the ram when I entered the House (i.e., the Ka`bah), and I forgot to tell you to cover them up; cover them up, for there should not be anything in the House which could distract the worshipper.)''' Sufyan said, "The horns of the ram remained hanging in the House until it was burned, and they were burned too.'' The Quraysh had inherited the horns of the ram that Abraham sacrificed, and they had been passed down from generation to generation, until the Messenger of God was sent. And God knows best.

From that day onwards, every Eid al-Adha once a year Muslims around the world slaughter an animal to commemorate Abraham's sacrifice and to remind themselves of self-abnegation in the way of God, and they would share the meat among friends, family, the poor and the needy. This is called Qurbani ("sacrifice").

=== Miracles ===
Abraham encountered several miracles of God during his lifetime. The Quran records a few main miracles, although different interpretations have been attributed to the passages. Some of the miracles recorded in the Quran are:

- Abraham was shown the kingdom of the Heavens and the Earth.
- Abraham and the miracle of the birds.
- Abraham was thrown into a fire, which became "cool" and "peaceful" for him.

The first passage has been interpreted both literally, allegorically, and otherwise. Although some commentators feel that this passage referred to a physical miracle, where Abraham was physically shown the entire kingdom of Heaven (Jannah), others have felt that it refers to the spiritual understanding of Abraham; these latter scholars maintain that the Chaldeans were skilled in the observance of the stars, but Abraham, who lived amongst them, saw beyond the physical world and into a higher spiritual realm. The second passage has one mainstream interpretation amongst the Quranic commentators, that Abraham took four birds and cut them up, placing pieces of each on nearby hills; when he called out to them, each piece joined and four birds flew back to Abraham. This miracle, as told by the Quranic passage, was a demonstration by God to show Abraham how God gave life to the dead. As the physical cutting of the birds is not implied in the passage, some commentators have offered alternative interpretations, but all maintain that the miracle was for the same demonstrative purpose to show Abraham the power God has to raise the dead to life. The third passage has also been interpreted both literally and metaphorically, or in some cases both. Commentators state that the 'fire' refers to the main aspects. They maintained that, firstly, the fire referred to the physical flame, from which Abraham was saved unharmed. The commentators further stated that, secondly, the fire referred to the 'fire of persecution', from which Abraham was saved, as he left his people after this with his wife Sarah and his nephew Lot.

== Title ==
Abraham is given the title Khalilullah in Islam. The Quran says:

And who is better in faith than those who ˹fully˺ submit themselves to Allah, do good, and follow the Way of Abraham, the upright? Allah chose Abraham as a close friend.

— Surah An-Nisa 4:125

This particular title of Abraham is so famous in Muslim culture and tradition that, in the areas in and around Mecca, Abraham is often referred to solely as The Friend. This title of Friend of God is not exclusive to Islamic theology. Although the other religious traditions do not stress upon it, Abraham is called a Friend of God in the second Book of Chronicles and the Book of Isaiah in the Hebrew Bible (Old Testament) as well as in the New Testament.

== Relationship with Islamic shrines ==
One of Abraham's most important features in Islamic theology is his role as the constructor of the Kaaba. Although tradition recounts that Adam constructed the original Kaaba, which was demolished by the Great Flood at the time of Noah, Abraham is believed to have rebuilt it in its original form. The Quran, in the Muslim perspective, merely confirms or reinforces the laws of pilgrimage. The rites were instituted by Abraham and for all Muslims, as they perform the pilgrimage, the event is a way to return to the perfection of Abraham's faith. Just as Medina is referred to as the "City of the Prophet [Muhammad]" or simply the "City of Muhammad", Mecca is frequently cited as the "City of Abraham", because Abraham's reformation of the monotheistic faith is believed to have taken place in Mecca. Likewise, Islamic belief links the original sanctuary of Al-Aqsa in the Old City of Jerusalem to Abraham.

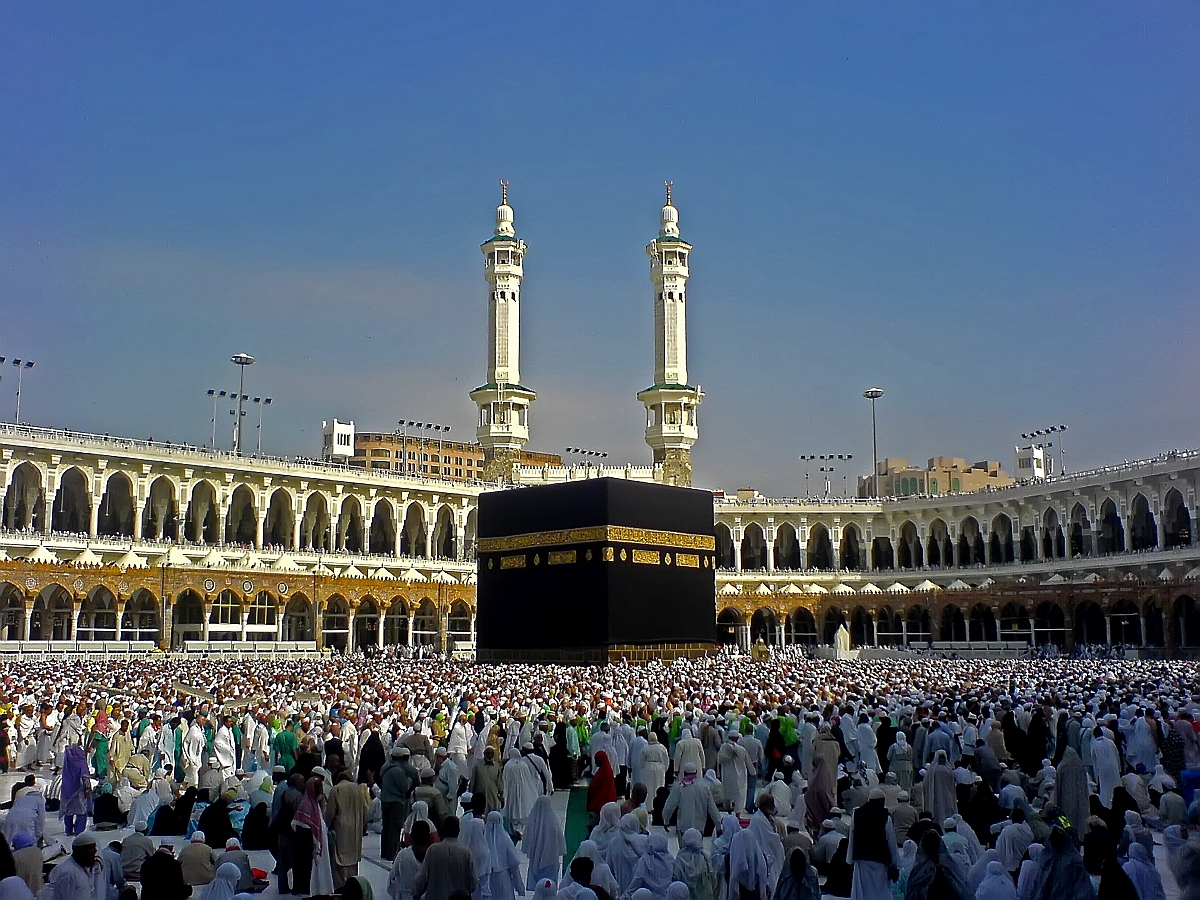
The most significant mosque in Islam, that is the Mosque of the Kaaba in the Hejazi city of Mecca, is believed to date to the time of Abraham and Ishmael

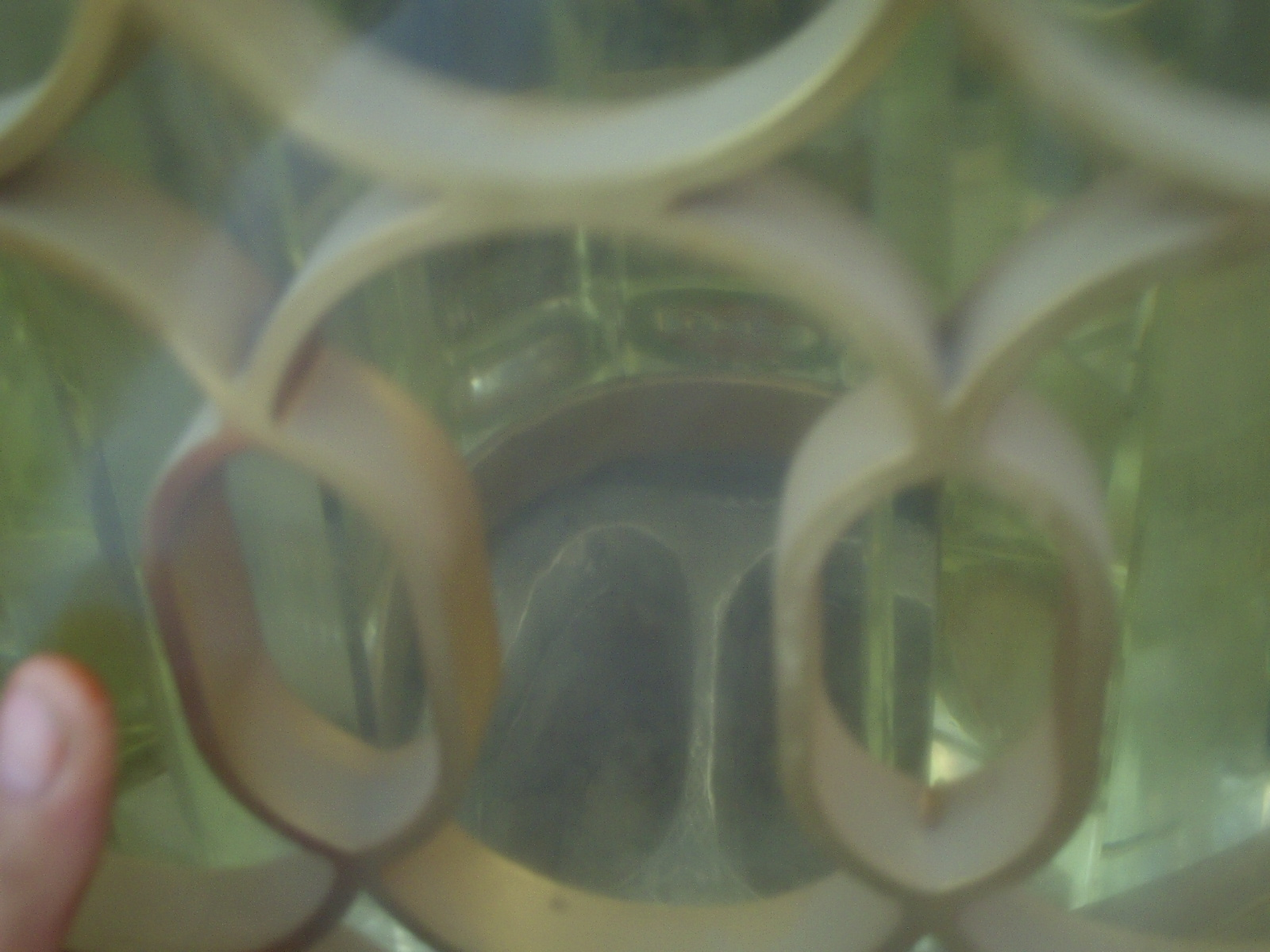
The Maqam (Station) of Abraham which is believed by Muslims to contain his footprints, near the Kaaba in Al-Masjid Al-Haram

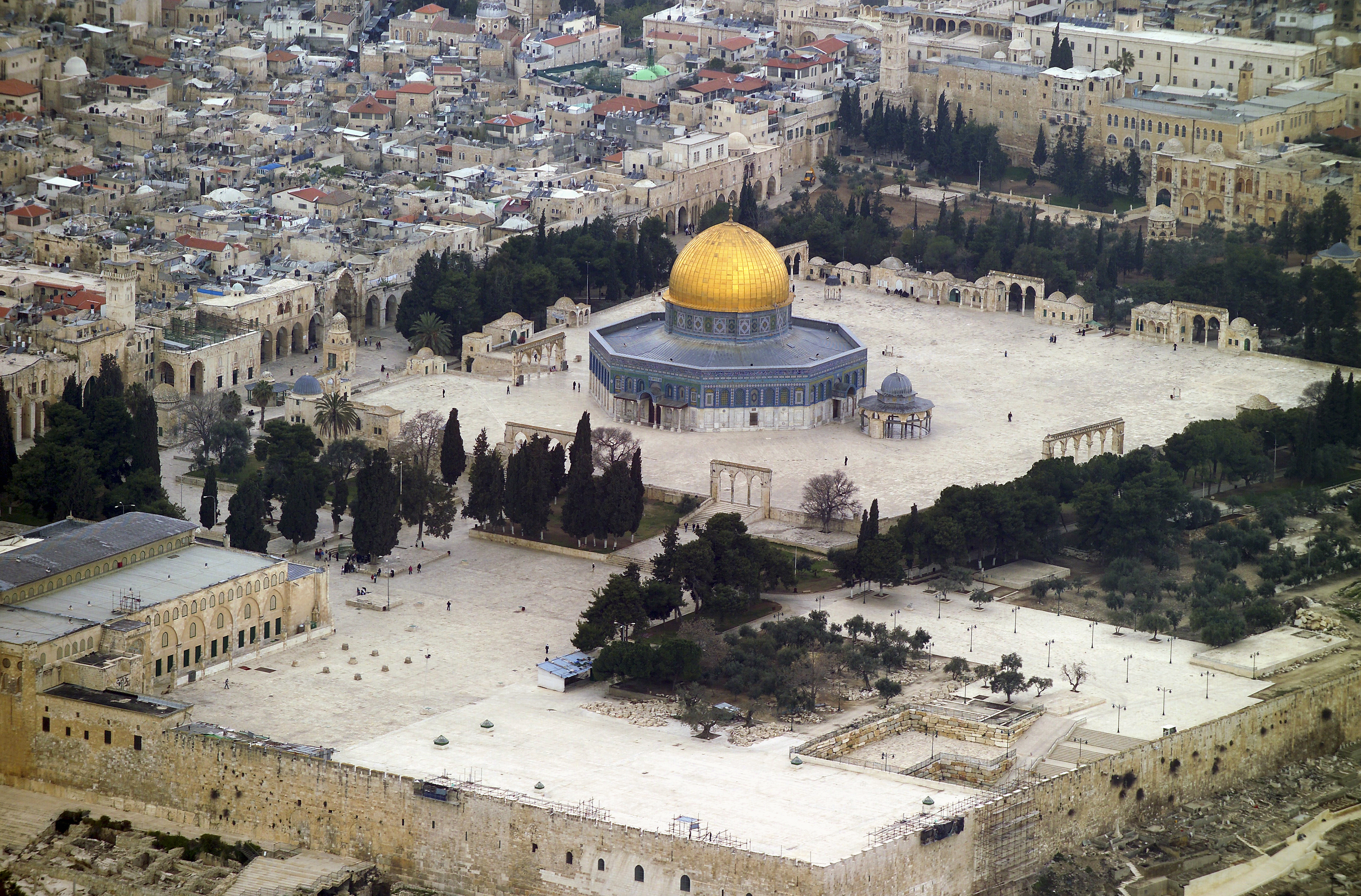
Masjid Al-Aqsa, also known as the Temple Mount, Old City of Jerusalem in Shaam, is also believed to date to the lifetime of Abraham

== Suhuf ==
The Quran refers to certain Scrolls of Abraham. All Muslim scholars have generally agreed that no scrolls of Abraham survive, and therefore this is a reference to a lost body of scripture. The Scrolls of Abraham are understood by Muslims to refer to certain revelations Abraham received, which he would have then transmitted to writing. The exact contents of the revelation are not described in the Qur'an.

The 87th chapter of the Quran, Surah al-Ala, concludes by saying the subject matter of the sura has been in the earlier scriptures of Abraham and Moses. It is slightly indicative of what were in the previous scriptures, according to Islam:

So ˹always˺ remind ˹with the Quran˺—˹even˺ if the reminder is beneficial ˹only to some˺.
Those in awe ˹of Allah˺ will be mindful ˹of it˺.
But it will be shunned by the most wretched,
who will burn in the greatest Fire,
where they will not ˹be able to˺ live or die.
Successful indeed are those who purify themselves,
remember the Name of their Lord, and pray.
But you ˹deniers only˺ prefer the life of this world,
even though the Hereafter is far better and more lasting.
This is certainly ˹mentioned˺ in the earlier Scriptures—
the Scriptures of Abraham and Moses.

— Surah Al-Ala 87:9–19

Surah an-Najm mentions some more subject matters of the earlier scriptures of Abraham and Musa (Moses):

Or has he not been informed of what is in the Scripture of Moses,
and ˹that of˺ Abraham, who ˹perfectly˺ fulfilled ˹his covenant˺?
˹They state˺ that no soul burdened with sin will bear the burden of another,
and that each person will only have what they endeavoured towards,
and that ˹the outcome of˺ their endeavours will be seen ˹in their record˺,
then they will be fully rewarded,
and that to your Lord ˹alone˺ is the ultimate return ˹of all things˺.
Moreover, He is the One Who brings about joy and sadness.
And He is the One Who gives life and causes death.
And He created the pairs—males and females—
from a sperm-drop when it is emitted.
And it is upon Him to bring about re-creation.
And He is the One Who enriches and impoverishes.
And He alone is the Lord of Sirius.
And He destroyed the first ˹people of˺ ʿĀd,
and ˹then˺ Thamûd, sparing no one.
And before ˹that He destroyed˺ the people of Noah, who were truly far worse in wrongdoing and transgression.
And ˹it was˺ He ˹Who˺ turned the cities ˹of Sodom and Gomorrah˺ upside down.
How overwhelming was what covered ˹them˺!
Now, which of your Lord's favours will you dispute?
This ˹Prophet˺ is a warner like earlier ones.
The approaching ˹Hour˺ has drawn near.
None but Allah can disclose it.
Do you find this revelation astonishing,
laughing ˹at it˺ and not weeping ˹in awe˺,
while persisting in heedlessness?
Instead, prostrate to Allah and worship ˹Him alone˺!

— Surah An-Najm 53:36–62

Yet some scholars suggested it to be a reference to the Sefer Yetzirah, as Jewish tradition generally ascribed its authorship to Abraham. Other scholars, however, wrote of a certain Testament of Abraham, which they explained was available at the time of Muhammad.

The Quran contains numerous references to Abraham, his life, prayers, and traditions and has a dedicated chapter named Ibrahim. On a relevant note, surah al-Kahf was revealed as an answer from God to the Jews who inquired of Muhammad about past events. Here God directly instructed Muhammad in surah Al-Kahf, not to consult the Jews for verifying the three stories about which they inquired.

Some will say, "They were three, their dog was the fourth," while others will say, "They were five, their dog was the sixth," ˹only˺ guessing blindly. And others will say, "They were seven and their dog was the eighth." Say, ˹O Prophet,˺ "My Lord knows best their ˹exact˺ number. Only a few people know as well." So do not argue about them except with sure knowledge,1 nor consult any of those ˹who debate˺ about them.

— Surah Al-Kahf 18:22

The reason being God declaring He Himself is relating what needs to be verified in another verse of al-Kahf:

We relate to you ˹O Prophet˺ their story in truth. They were youths who truly believed in their Lord, and We increased them in guidance.

— Surah Al-Kahf 18:13

Regarding consultation with the People of the Book, it is also narrated by Abu Hurairah in hadith:

Narrated Abu Huraira: The people of the Scripture (Jews) used to recite the Torah in Hebrew and they used to explain it in Arabic to the Muslims. On that God's Apostle said, "Do not believe the people of the Scripture or disbelieve them, but say: 'We believe in God and what is revealed to us.'"

— Muhammad al-Bukhari, Sahih al-Bukhari, 6:60:12

Therefore, relating to any ascription of the Scrolls of Abraham by the people of the book is not required.

== Significance as a patriarch ==
Abraham is also extremely important as a leader of Islam and as a patriarch of the Islamic faith. Muslims recognize Abraham as the ancestor through whom many other prophets and saints (Wali) came, including Moses, Jesus (Isa) and Muhammad. The Quran lists, in the sixth chapter, some of the greatest figures to have through Abraham's progeny:

This was the argument We gave Abraham against his people. We elevate in rank whoever We please. Surely your Lord is All-Wise, All-Knowing.
And We blessed him with Isaac and Jacob. We guided them all as We previously guided Noah and those among his descendants: David, Solomon, Job, Joseph, Moses, and Aaron. This is how We reward the good-doers.
Likewise, ˹We guided˺ Zachariah, John, Jesus, and Elias, who were all of the righteous.
˹We also guided˺ Ishmael, Elisha, Jonah, and Lot, favouring each over other people ˹of their time˺.
And ˹We favoured˺ some of their forefathers, their descendants, and their brothers. We chose them and guided them to the Straight Path.

— Quran 6:83–87

Abraham's narrative in the Quran indirectly refers to his role as one of the great patriarchs. The Quran says that God made Abraham "an Imam to the Nations" and father to Muslims, and his narrative records him praying for his offspring. The Quran further states that Abraham's descendants were given "the Book and Wisdom", and this fact is reinforced in a verse which states that Abraham's family was one of those in which the gift of prophecy was established as a generic trait. The Quran emphasizes upon Abraham's significance as it states that Abraham's family, Noah, Adam and the family of Amram were the four selected by God above all the worlds. As a result of his significance as a patriarch, Abraham is sometimes given the title Father of the Prophets. Of Abraham's immediate sons, the Quran repeatedly establishes the gifts God bestowed upon them. Ishmael, along with Elisha and Dhul-Kifl (possibly Ezekiel), is regarded as being "of the Company of the Good." and one of the men who was given "favour above the nations." In addition, Ishmael is described as being "true to what he promised, and he was a messenger (and) a prophet." Likewise, the Quran says of Isaac that he was "of the company of the Elect and the Good." and was "a prophet,- one of the Righteous." and further describes him as "of Power and Vision."

== Burial place ==
Muslims believe that Abraham was buried, along with his wife Sarah, at the Sanctuary of Ibrahim (Cave of the Patriarchs) in the Old City of Hebron, in the Levant. Known in Arabic as al-Ḥaram al-Ibrāhīmī it is also thought to be the burial site of his son Isaac, his wife Rebecca, their son Jacob, and his wife Leah.

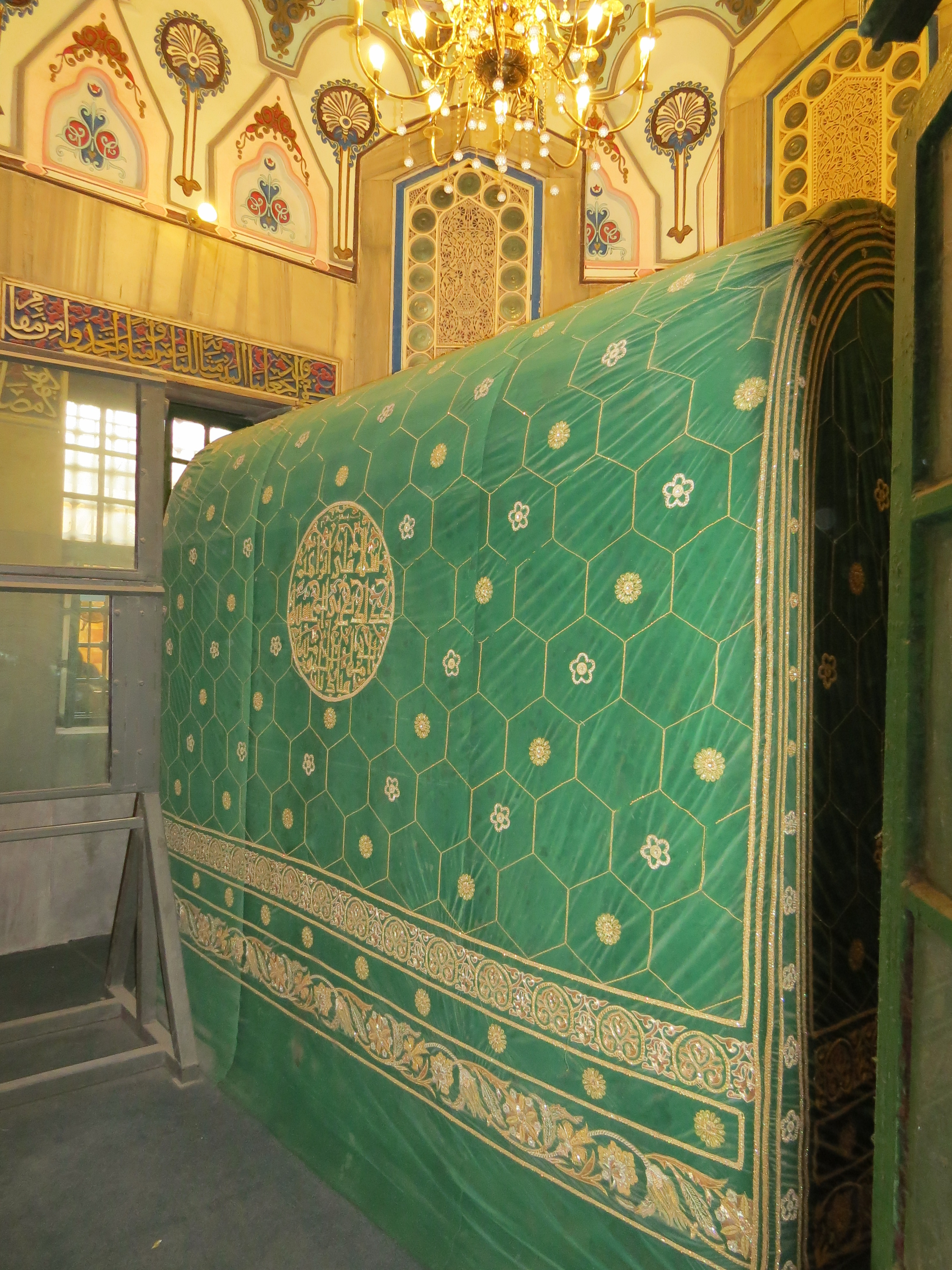
Cenotaph over Abraham's grave in his mosque at Hebron

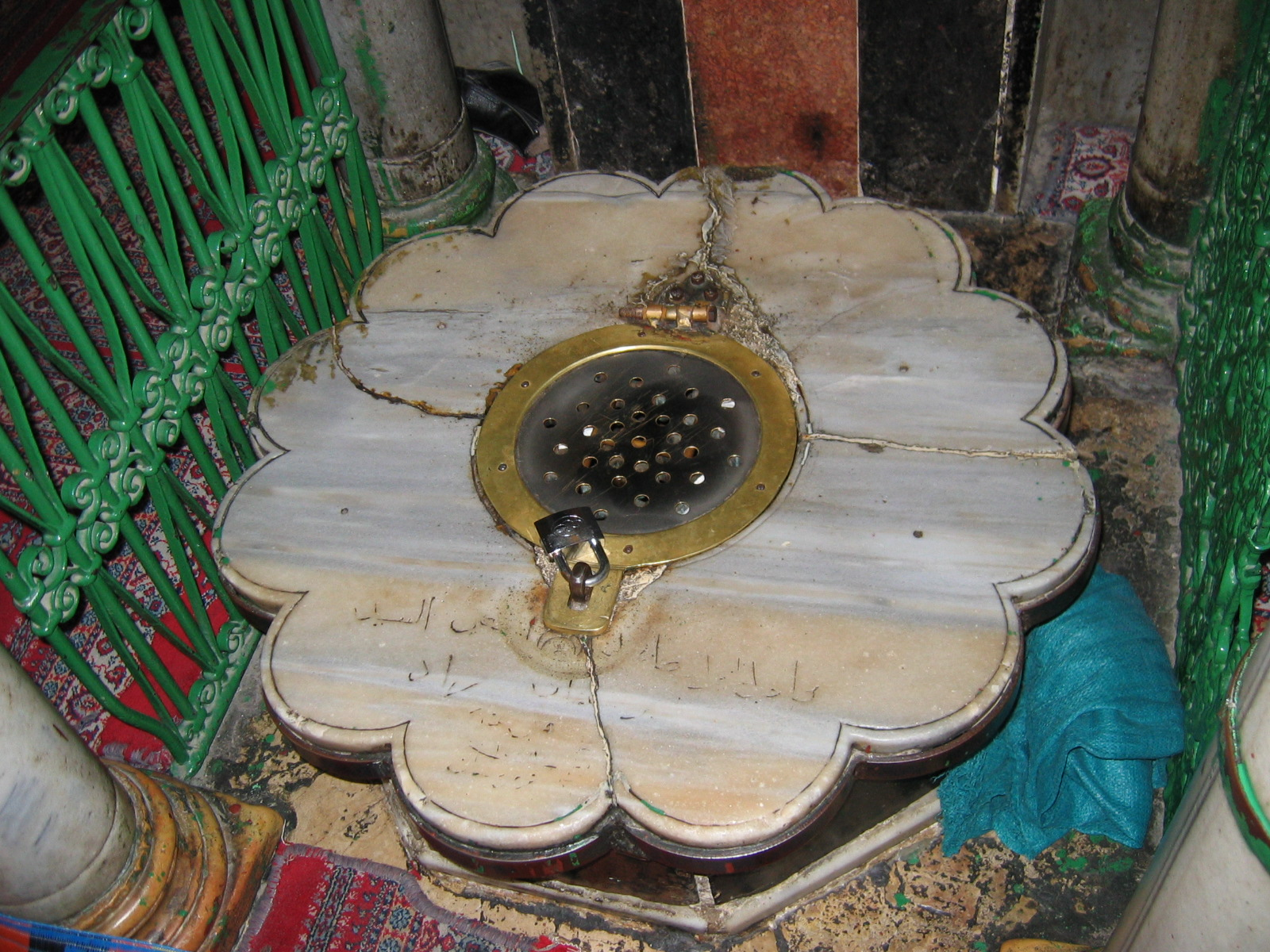
In the section of the cave which is a mosque, this grate allows visitors to look down into a shaft measuring 40 feet (12 metres), which leads to the ground level of the cave where Abraham and Sarah are buried

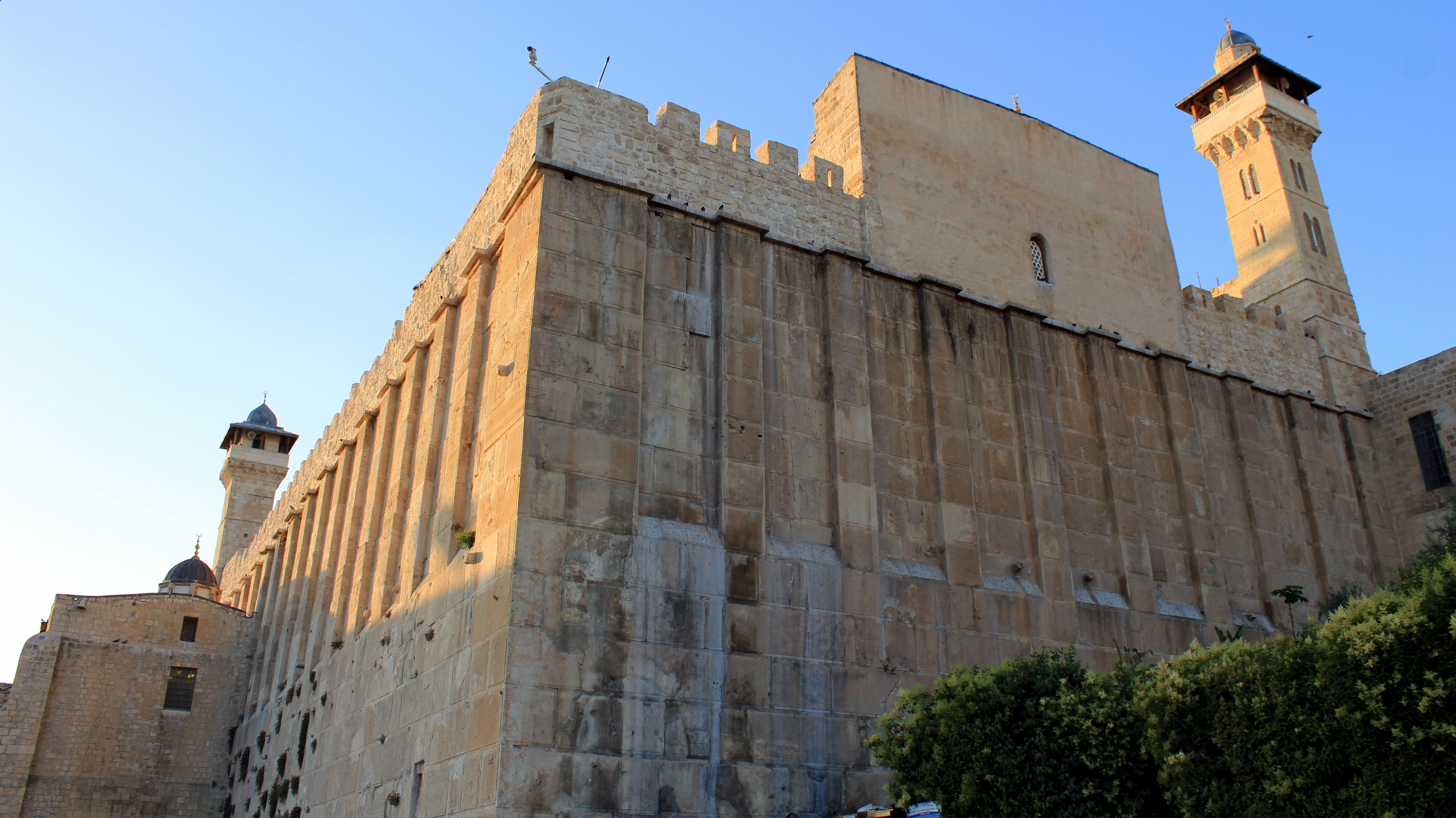
Exterior view of the Cave of the Patriarchs in the Old City of Hebron, the Holy Land

== See also ==
- Abraham (disambiguation)
- Ibrahim (disambiguation)
- Ibrahim (name)
- Islamic architecture
- Biblical and Quranic narratives
- List of legends in the Quran
- Muhammad in the Quran
