= Genesis 11 (disambiguation) =

Genesis 11 is the biblical story of the Tower of Babel.

It may also refer to:

- Genesis 11:10-26, which concerns Shem's descendants
- Genesis 11:27-32, which relates to Terah and his descendants
