= Terah =

Figure in the Hebrew Bible; son of Nahor

Terah תֶּרַח
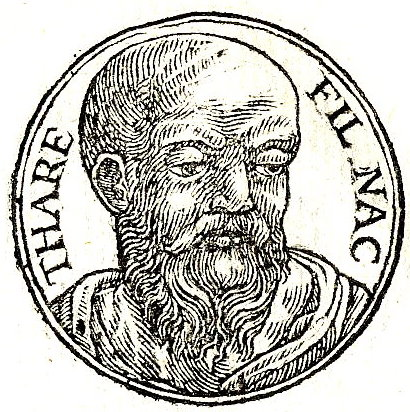
- Illustration of Terah with Latin text from Promptuarii Iconum Insigniorum
- Born: 1948 AM; Ur Kaśdim, Chaldea, Sumer (present-day southern Iraq)
- Died: 2018 AM; Haran (present-day southeastern Turkey)
- Children: Abraham (son); Nahor (son); Haran (son)
- Parent(s): Nahor ben Serug (father) 'Ijaska bat Nestag (mother, according to Book of Jubilees)
- Relatives: Azar (brother as some Islamic traditions)

Terah, also spelled Terach (Hebrew: תֶּרַח, romanized: Teraḥ), was a biblical figure in the Book of Genesis. He is listed as the son of Nahor and father of the patriarch Abraham. As such, he is a descendant of Shem's son Arpachshad. Terah is mentioned in Genesis 11:24–32, Joshua 24:2, and 1 Chronicles 1:17–27 in the Hebrew Bible, and in Luke 3:34 in the New Testament.

== Biblical narrative ==
Terah is first mentioned in Genesis 11:24, which states that his father was Nahor. Genesis 11:26–32, Joshua 24:2, and 1 Chronicles 1:17–27 of the Hebrew Bible all concern Terah. He is mentioned in Genesis 11:26–32 as a son of Nahor, the son of Serug, descendants of Shem. He had three sons: Abram (better known by his later name Abraham), Haran, and Nahor II. The family lived in Ur of the Chaldees. His grandchildren were Lot, Milcah and Iscah, whose father, Haran, had died at Ur.

In the Book of Joshua, in his final speech to the Israelite leaders assembled at Shechem, Joshua recounts the history of God's formation of the Israelite nation, beginning with "Terah the father of Abraham and Nahor, who lived beyond the Euphrates River and worshiped other gods". Terah is also mentioned in a biblical genealogy given in 1 Chronicles.

In the Genesis narrative, Terah took his family and left Ur to move to the land of Canaan. Terah set out for Canaan but stopped in the city of Haran along the way, where he died. R. N. Whybray observes that this narrative "in fact function[s] as the beginning of the story of Abraham"; in introducing the "principal characters in that story, Abraham, his wife Sarai (Sarah), and his brother Lot", the passage completes "the link between the primeval world and that of the patriarchs, Abraham, Isaac, and Jacob, the 'fathers' of Israel".

In the New Testament, Luke 3:34 includes Terah within the genealogy of Jesus Christ. His name is recorded as "Thara" in the King James Version, and as "Thare" in the Latin Vulgate.

== Jewish tradition ==
=== Children ===
Genesis 11:26 states that Terah lived 70 years, "and begot Abram, Nahor, and Haran". The Talmud says that Abraham was 52 years old at year 2000 AM (Anno Mundi), which means that he was born in the year 1948 AM.

=== Occupation ===
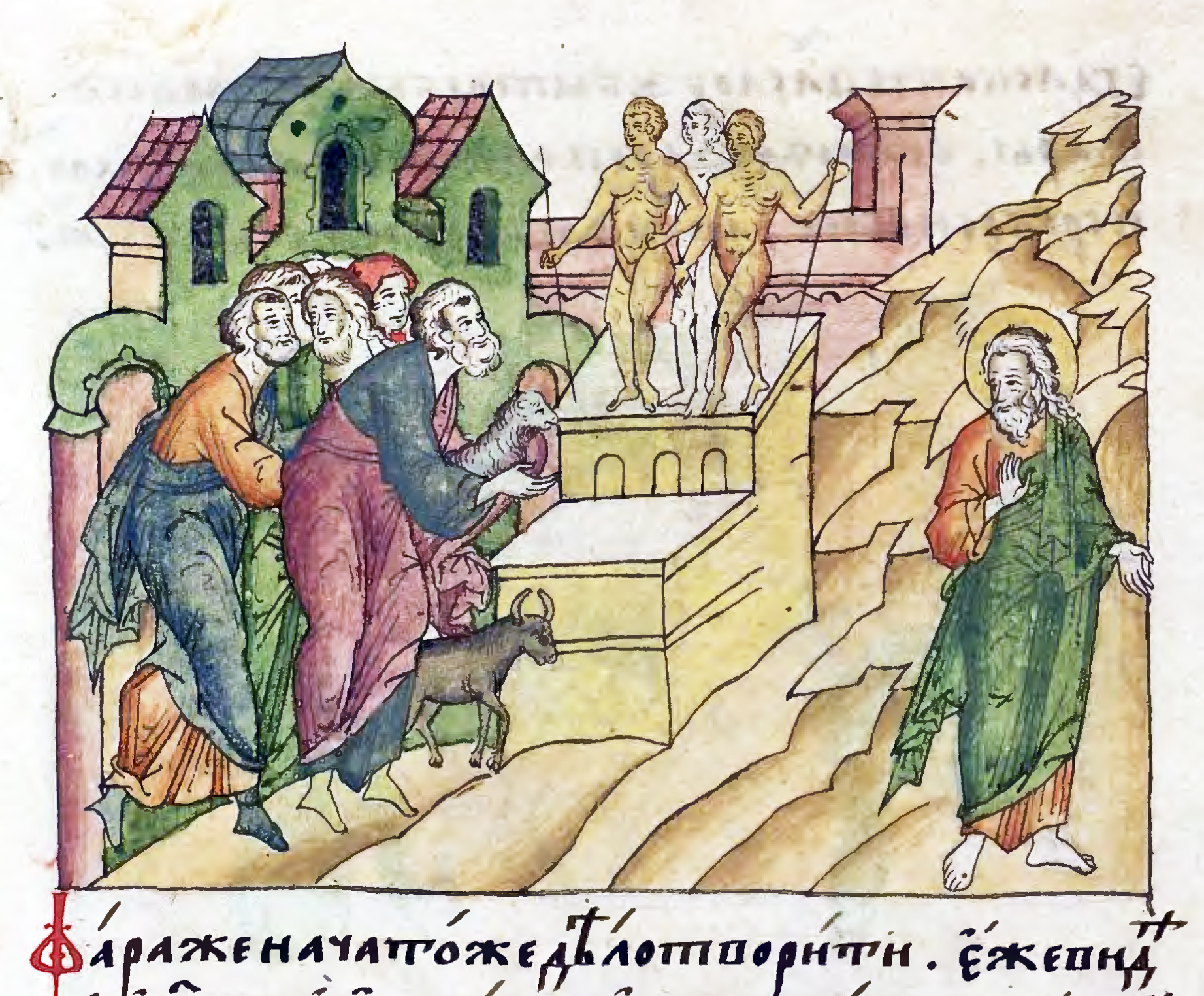
Terah with idols, young Abraham leaving in disgrace

According to rabbinic literature Terah was a wicked (Numbers Rabbah 19:1; 19:33), idolatrous priest (Midrash HaGadol on Genesis 11:28) who manufactured idols (Eliyahu Rabbah 6, and Eliyahu Zuta 25). Abram, in opposition to his father's idol shop, smashed his father's idols and chased customers away. Terah then brought his unruly son before Nimrod, who threw him into a fiery furnace, yet Abram miraculously escaped (Genesis Rabbah 38:13). The Zohar says that when God saved Abram from the furnace, Terah repented (Zohar Genesis 1:77b) and Rabbi Abba B. Kahana said that God assured Abram that his father Terah had a portion in the World to Come (Genesis Rabbah 30:4; 30:12).

Rabbi Hiyya relates this account in the Genesis Rabbah:

Terah left Abram to mind the store while he departed. A woman came with a plateful of flour and asked Abram to offer it to the idols. Abram then took a stick, broke the idols, and put the stick in the largest idol's hand. When Terah returned, he demanded that Abram explain what he'd done. Abram told his father that the idols fought among themselves and the largest broke the others with the stick. "Why do you make sport of me?" Terah cried, "Do they have any knowledge?" Abram replied, "Listen to what you are saying!"

=== Leader of the journey ===
Terah is identified as the person who arranged and led the family to embark on a mysterious journey to Canaan. It is shrouded in mystery to Jewish scholars as to why Terah began the journey and as to why the journey ended prematurely. It is suggested that he was a man in search of a greater truth that could be found in the land of Canaan, and that it was Abram who picked up the torch to continue his father's quest, which Terah himself was unable to achieve.

The name of Terah's son "Haran" who died in Ur is very similar to the name of the city where the family settled, "Charan." One explanation as to why Terah did not finish the journey centres on his emotional state. He grieved over the loss of Haran who died "in his father's face." As often in biblical narratives, the names of places and the sounds of the names often indicates something behind the text. It is likely that the author of the text is conveying the idea that Terah settled in Charan, even though he intended to go to Canaan, because he became stuck in his grief and could not get over it. Then, once Terah had died, Abram - now the leader of the family - heads out to finish the mission and, eventually, arrives there.

=== When Abram leaves Haran ===
In Jewish tradition, when Terah died at age 205, Abraham (70 years younger) was already 135 years old. Abram thus left Haran at age 75, well before Terah died. The significance of Terah not reaching Canaan was a reflection of his character, a man who was unable to go "all the way". Although on a journey in the right direction, Terah fell short at arriving to the divine destination—in contrast to Abram, who did follow through and achieved the divine goal, and was not bound by his father's idolatrous past. Abram's following God's command to leave his father, thus absolved him from the mitzvah of honoring parents, and as Abraham, he would go on to create a new lineage distinct from his ancestors.

== Samaritan tradition ==
In the Samaritan Pentateuch Terah dies aged 145 years and Abram leaves Haran after his death.

== Christian tradition ==
In the Christian tradition Abram left Haran after Terah died. The Christian views of the time of Terah come from a passage in the New Testament at Acts 7:2–4 where Stephen said some things that contrast with Jewish rabbinical views. He said that God appeared to Abraham in Mesopotamia, and directed him to leave the Chaldeans—whereas most rabbinical commentators see Terah as being the one who directed the family to leave Ur Kasdim from Genesis 11:31: "Terah took his son Abram, his daughter-in-law Sarai (his son Abram's wife), and his grandson Lot (his son Haran's child) and left Ur of the Chaldeans to go to the land of Canaan." Stephen asserts that Abram left Haran after Terah died.

== Islamic tradition ==
Within the Quran a figure named Azar is referred as the 'ab' (أب; father, forefather) of Ibrahim. The name Terah is not mentioned. Within Islamic scholarship there is debate as to whether Azar is identified with Terah, Azar is Ibrahim's paternal uncle and Terah is his father, or Terah is not Ibrahim's father.

Some are of the opinion that Azar is not the father of Ibrahim. The actual name of the father of Ibrahim is Tarakh, not Azar. Ibn Hajar's position is that in fact Azar is the paternal uncle of Ibrahim and that Arabs use the term "ab" to refer to the paternal uncle also and that Allah used this expression in the Qur'an 2:133 where Isma'il, the paternal uncle of Ya'koob,is referred to as an "ab".

Some commentators said: Terah's, had two names: Azar and Terah, as Al-Tabari narrated in Jami' al-Bayan (11/466) with his chain of transmission on the authority of Saeed bin Abdul Aziz. He said: He is Azar, and he is Terah, such as "Israel" and "Jacob".

It is also maintained by some that Azar's real name was Nakhoor, and that though Azar earlier worshipped Allah, he abandoned his forefathers' religion when he became the minister of Namrud.

=== In Shi'a Islam ===
==== Terah as Abraham's father ====
There is a consensus among Shia Muslim scholars and exegetes that Azar was not the biological father of Abraham but rather his paternal uncle while Terah is believed to be his father. Shaykh Tusi maintained that Azar was not Abraham's father and cited a hadith from Muhammad according to which none of the prophet's ancestors up to Adam were polytheists. By this he argued that since Azar was an idolater and Abraham was one of the prophet's ancestors, it is not possible for Azar to be Abraham's father. According to Grand Ayatollah Naser Makarem Shirazi in Tafsir Nemooneh, all Shiite exegetes and scholars believe that Azar was not Abraham's father. Allamah Tabatabai in his Tafsir al-Mizan appealed to the Quranic verses in which Abraham prayed for his parents, that they show that his father was someone other than Azar. In Dua Umm Dawood, a supplication recited by Shi'ite Muslims cited to be from Imam Ja'far al-Sadiq, the supplicant sends blessings on a person by the name of 'Turakh'. In Nahj al-Balagha, Imam Ali is reported to have said in a sermon, "I testify that Muhammad is His servant and messenger, and the chief of His creation; whenever Allah divided the line of descent, He put him in the better one.." Likewise, in Ziyarat Arbaeen, a recitation with which Shiite Muslims pay respect to Imam Husayn, it is recited "I bear witness that you were a light in the sublime loins and purified wombs..", through which it is believed that none of his ancestors up to Adam were impure, which includes Muhammad, Imam Ali and Lady Fatimah and hence including Abraham's biological father.

The Twelver Shi'ite website Al-Islam.org treats Azar as being Abraham's uncle, not his biological father. To justify this view, it references a passage of the Quran, which mentions that the sons of Yaʿqūb (Jacob) referred to his uncle Ismāʿīl (Ishmael), father Is-ḥāq (Isaac) and grandfather Ibrāhīm (Abraham) as his ābāʾ (Arabic: آبَـاء):

Were you there to see when death came upon Ya'qub? When he said to his sons, "What will you worship after I am gone?" they replied, "We shall worship your God and the God of your abaʾ, Ibrahim, Isma'il, and Is-haq, one single God: we devote ourselves to Him."

— Qur'an, 2:133

Therefore, the singular word ab does not always mean progenitor, and can be used for an uncle or caretaker or a forefather, unlike the word wālid (Arabic: وَالِـد, progenitor). Thus, Al-Islam.org denies that Abraham's biological father was 'Azar', and instead agreed with Ibn Kathir that he was the biblical figure 'Terah', who nevertheless treated him as a polytheist.

==== As Abraham's uncle ====
In contrast to Al-Islam.org, Shi'ite scholar and jurist Mohammad Taqi al-Modarresi believed Terah to be the uncle of Abraham, not his father.

== In popular culture ==
Terah is portrayed by Vittorio Gassman in the film Abraham (1993).
