= Harran, Idlib =

Harran, Idlib حران
- Village
- Location in Syria
- Coordinates: 35°34′1″N 36°48′11″E
- Country: Syria
- Governorate: Idlib
- District: Maarrat al-Nu'man District
- Subdistrict: Maarrat al-Nu'man Nahiyah

Population (2004)
  - Total: 456
- Time zone: UTC+2 (EET)
  - Summer (DST): UTC+3 (EEST)
- City Qrya Pcode: C3970

Harran, Idlib (Arabic: حران) is a Syrian village located in Maarrat al-Nu'man Nahiyah in Maarrat al-Nu'man District, Idlib. According to the Syria Central Bureau of Statistics (CBS), Harran, Idlib had a population of 456 in the 2004 census.
