= Haran, Iran =

Haran (Persian: هران or هرن) may refer to:

- Haran, Isfahan (هران - Harān)
- Haran, Markazi (هرن -Haran)
