= Isaac in Islam =

Islamic view of Isaac the son of Abraham

Prophet ʾIsḥāq Alayhi as-Salam
- إِسْحَاق; Isaac
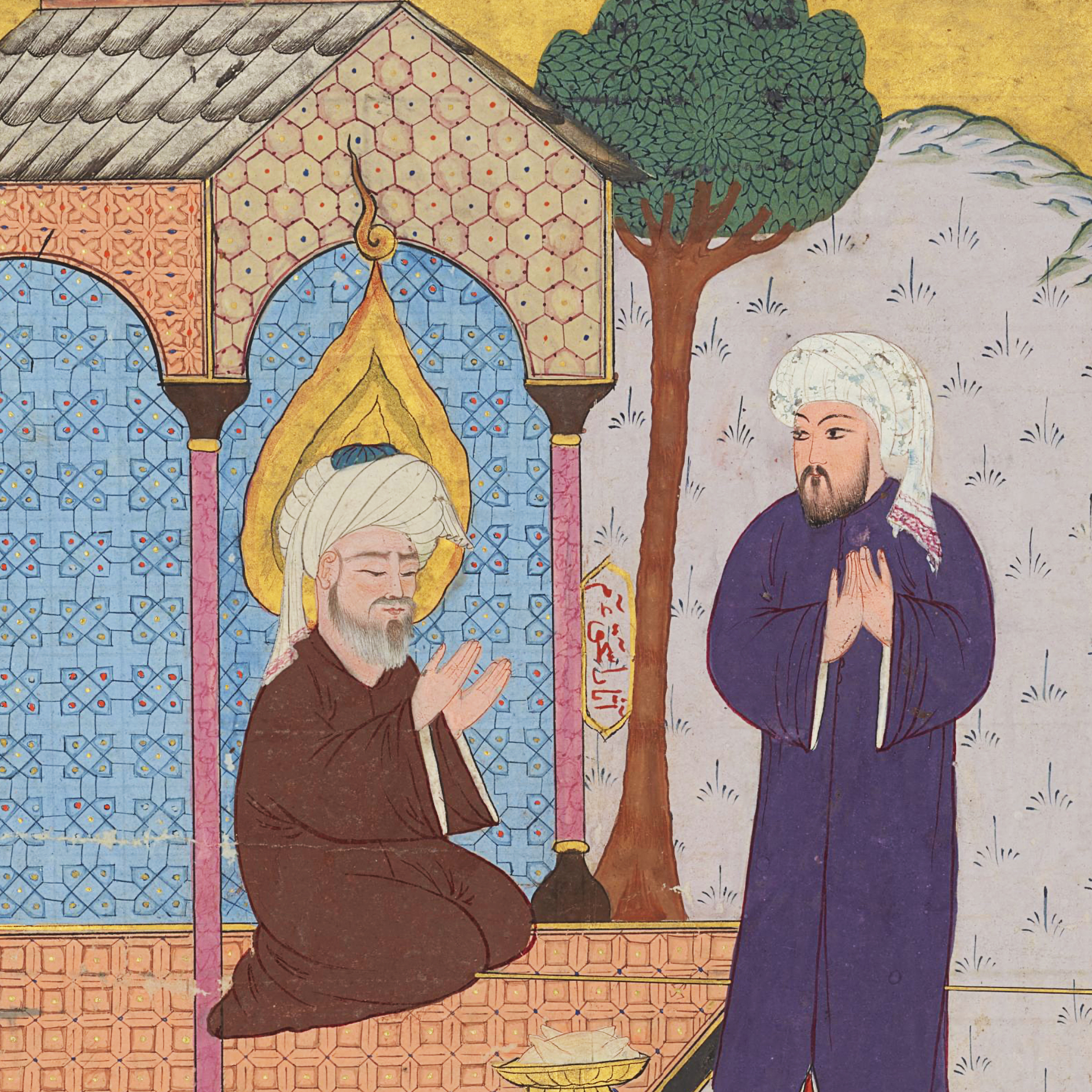
- Ottoman depiction of Isaac praying.

Prophet of Islam
- Preceded by: Ismail
- Succeeded by: Yaqub

Personal life
- Born: Ishaq ibn Ibrahim Canaan
- Resting place: Cave of the Patriarchs, Hebron
- Children: Yaqub
- Parent(s): Ibrahim and Sarah
- Relatives: Ismail (half-brother), Lut (cousin), forefather of the Twelve Tribes of Israel

Religious life
- Religion: Islam

The biblical patriarch Isaac (Arabic: إِسْحَاق or إِسْحٰق^{[note]} ʾIsḥāq) is recognized as a prophet of God by Muslims. Like Judaism and Christianity, Islam maintains that Isaac was the son of the patriarch and prophet Ibrahim from his wife Sarah. Muslims hold ʾIsḥāq in deep veneration because they believe that both ʾIsḥāq and his older half-brother Ishmael continued their father's spiritual legacy through their subsequent preaching of the message of Allah after the death of Ibrahim. ʾIsḥāq is mentioned in fifteen passages of the Quran. Along with being mentioned several times in the Quran, ʾIsḥāq is held up as one of Islam's prophets.

== Early life ==
Because of Allah's grace and covenant with Ibrahim, his wife was gifted with a child in her old age. Isaac was the age of 10 when his half-brother Ishmael went out from Abraham's house into the desert. While in the desert Ishmael took a wife of the daughters of Moab named ʿAʾishah.

== In the Quran ==
ʾIsḥāq is mentioned seventeen times by name in the Quran, often with his father and his son, Yaʿqūb (Jacob). The Quran states that Ibrahim received "good tidings of Isaac, a prophet, of the righteous", and that God blessed them both (37: 112). "And We gave him glad tidings of Isaac, a prophet from among the righteous. And We blessed him and Isaac. And among their progeny are the virtuous and those who clearly wrong themselves" In a fuller description, when angels came to Ibrahim to tell him of the future punishment to be imposed on Sodom and Gomorrah, his wife (Sarah, in Torah and Bible), "laughed, and We gave her good tidings of Isaac, and after Isaac of (a grandson) Jacob" (11: 71–74); and it is further explained that this event will take place despite Ibrahim and his wife's old age. Several verses speak of Isaac as a "gift" to Ibrahim (6: 84; 19: 49–50), and 29: 26-27 adds that God made "prophethood and the Book to be among his offspring", which has been interpreted to refer to Abraham's two prophetic sons, his prophetic grandson Jacob, and his prophetic great-grandson Joseph. In the Quran, it later narrates that Abraham also praised God for giving him Ishmael and Isaac in his old age (XIV: 39–41).

Elsewhere in the Quran, Isaac is mentioned in lists: Joseph follows the religion of his forefathers Abraham, Isaac and Jacob (12: 38) and speaks of God's favor to them (12: 6); Yaʿqūb's sons all testify their faith and promise to worship the God that their forefathers, "Ibrahim, Ishmael and Isaac", worshiped (2: 127); and the Quran commands Muslims to believe in the revelations that were given to "Ibrahim, Ishmael, Isaac, Jacob and the Patriarchs" (2: 136; III: 84).

== Burial site ==
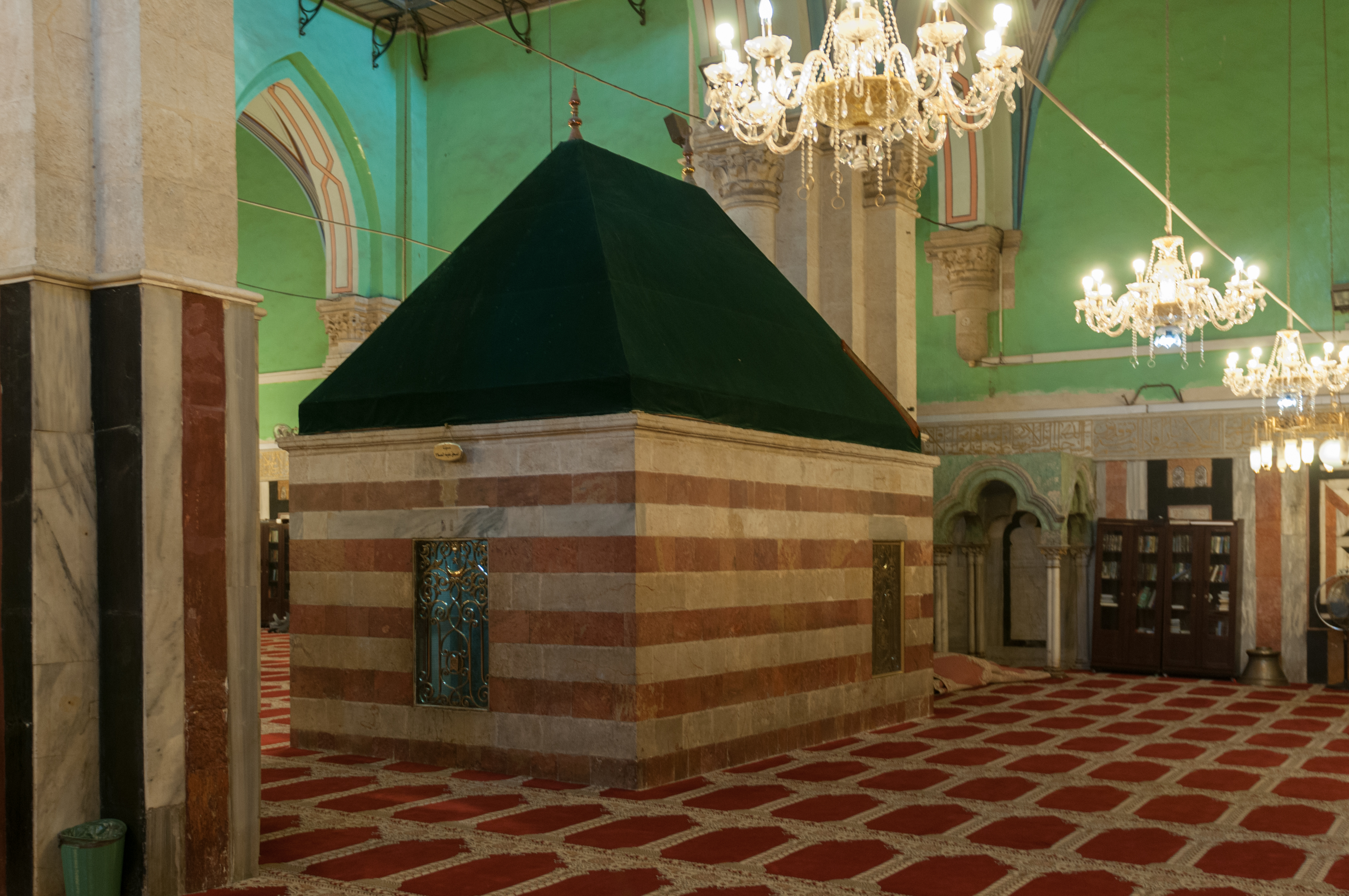
The Tomb of Isaac in Hebron

ʾIsḥāq's tomb and that of his wife (not mentioned by name in Quran, in the Torah and Bible she is named Rivqa, Rebekah ) are considered to be in the Cave of the Patriarchs in Hebron, the West Bank, known in Islam as the Masjid-i-Ibrahim ("Mosque of Ibrahim"). Alongside ʾIsḥāq's tomb, would be those of some of the other Abrahamic patriarchs and their wives: Ibrahim and his wife (Sarah, in Torah and Bible, is neither mentioned by name in the Quran), Yaqoub and Layaa ليا (or Layiah ليئة ).

== See also ==
- Biblical narratives and the Quran
- Prophets of Islam
- Stories of The Prophets

== Footnotes ==
- ^[note] إسحٰق (ʾIsḥ^{ā}q) is the traditional Quranic spelling after vocalizing with a super script ʾalif. In Modern Standard Arabic, it is normally written إسحاق (ʾIsḥāq); IPA: /ʔisħaːq/.

== Bibliography ==
- C.H. Becker, Islamstudien, i, 47
- ZDMG, xxxii, 359, ii
- Encyclopedia of Islam, W. M. Watt, Ishak
- Stories of the Prophets, Kisa'i; Ibn Kathir, The Story of Isaac and Jacob
