= Ishmael in Islam =

Islamic view of Ishmael

Prophet ʾIsmāʿīl Alayhi as-Salam
- إسماعيل
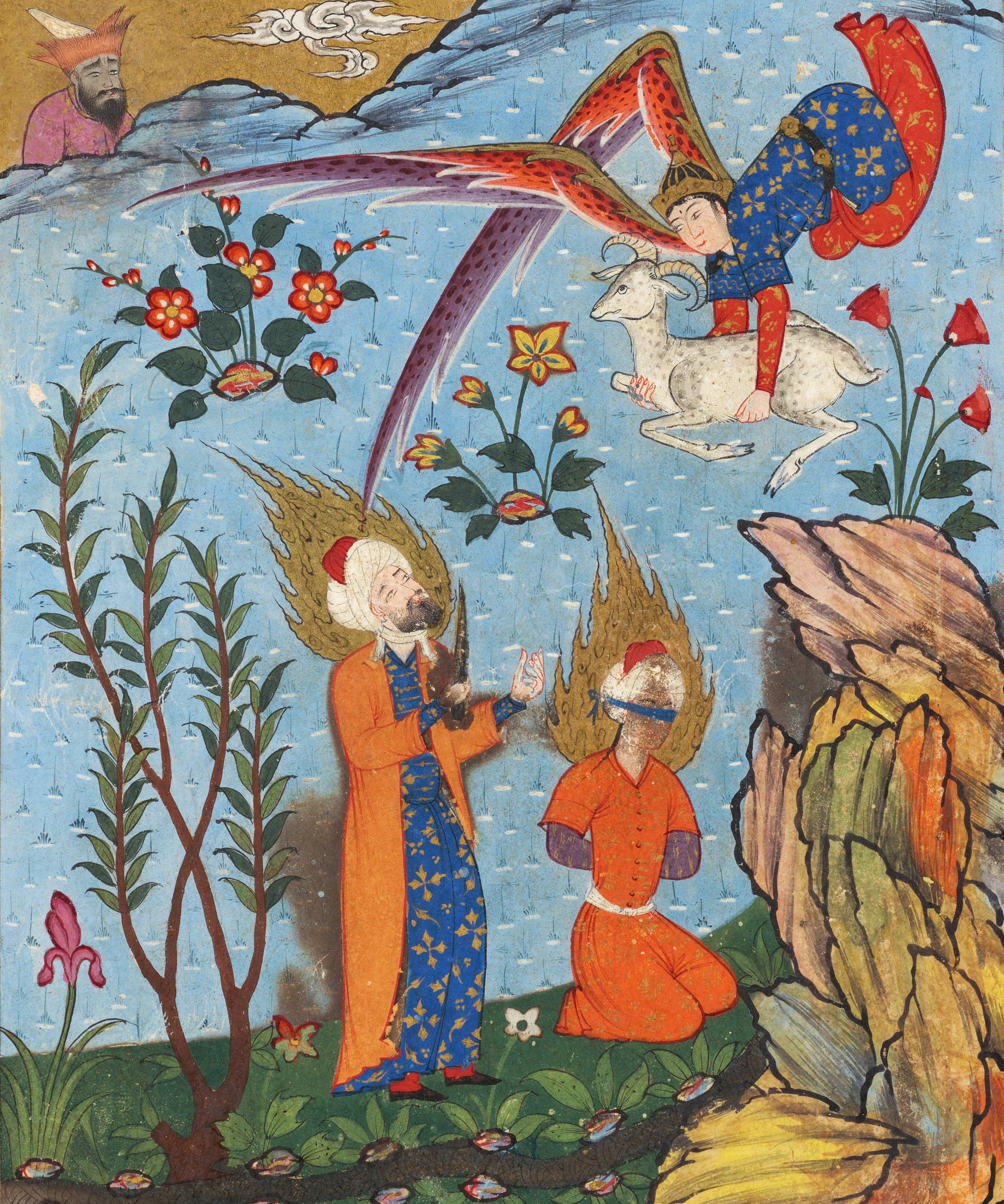
- Isma'il willingly kneeling blind-folded to be killed by his father, Ibrahim, who is stopped by Jibril delivering a sheep.

Prophet of Islam
- Preceded by: Lut
- Succeeded by: Ishaq

Personal life
- Born: Isma'il ibn Ibrahim Canaan
- Died: Makkah
- Children: Ishmaelites
- Parents: Ibrahim (father); Hajar (mother)
- Relatives: Ishaq (half-brother); Lut (cousin)

Religious life
- Religion: Islam

Ishmael (Arabic: إسماعيل ʾIsmāʿīl) is regarded by Muslims as an Islamic prophet. Born to Abraham and Hagar, he is the namesake of the Ishmaelites, who were descended from him. In Islam, he is associated with Mecca and the construction of the Kaaba within today's Masjid al-Haram, which is the holiest Islamic site. Muslims also consider him to be a direct ancestor to Muhammad. His paternal half-brother was Isaac, the forefather of the Israelites.

Islam's conception of Ishmael is similar to that of Judaism and Christianity. Sources for this narrative include the Quran and tafsir (i.e., Quranic exegesis); Muhammad's ahadith; historiographic collections by al-Tabari and other Muslim scholars; and Israʼiliyyat, which collectively refers to information and religious literature sourced primarily from the Jews for details about early prophets and messengers.

== Quranic narrative ==
=== Birth ===
Ishmael was the first son of Abraham; his mother was Hajar. There are many versions of the story, some of which include a prophecy about Ishmael's birth. One such example is from Ibn Kathir (d. 1373) whose account states that an angel tells the pregnant Hajar to name her child Ishmael and prophesies, "His hand would be over everyone, and the hand of everyone would be against him. His brethren would rule over all the lands." Ibn Kathir comments that this foretells of Muhammad's leadership.

=== Ishmael and Hagar taken to Mecca by Abraham ===
Ishmael and Hagar being taken to Mecca by Abraham in Islamic texts is an important part in the story of Ishmael, as it brings the focus to Mecca and is the beginning of Mecca's sanctification as a holy area. Islamic tradition says Abraham was ordered by God to take Hagar and Ishmael to Mecca, and later Abraham returned to Mecca to build the Kaaba. In many of these accounts, the Sakina (something like a wind or spirit sent by God), or the angel Gabriel (Jibreel) guides them to the location of the Kaaba, at which point Abraham builds it and afterwards, leaves the other two there (other versions discussed below say the construction of the Kaaba occurred later and that Ishmael took part in it). Generally, it is said that Hagar asks Abraham who he is entrusting herself and Ishmael to as he leaves them. He answers that he is entrusting them to God, to which Hagar then makes a reply that shows her faith, stating that she believes God will guide them. Hagar and Ishmael then run out of water and Ishmael becomes extremely thirsty. Hagar is distressed and searches for water, running back and forth seven times between the hills of Al-Safa and Al-Marwah. Hagar is later remembered by Muslims for this act during the Hajj, or pilgrimage, in which Muslims run between these same hills as part of the Sa'yee. When she returns to Ishmael, she finds either him or an angel scratching the ground with their heel or finger, whereupon water begins flowing and Hagar collects some or dams it up. This spring or well is known as Zamzam. At some point, a passing tribe known as the Jurhum sees birds circling the water and investigates. They ask Hagar if they can settle there, which she allows, and many versions say as Ishmael grew up he learned various things from the tribe. There are numerous versions of this story, each differing in various ways. The versions used in this summary, as well as others, can be found in al-Tabari's history and are recounted in Reuven Firestone's Journeys in Holy Lands.

=== Binding of Ishmael ===
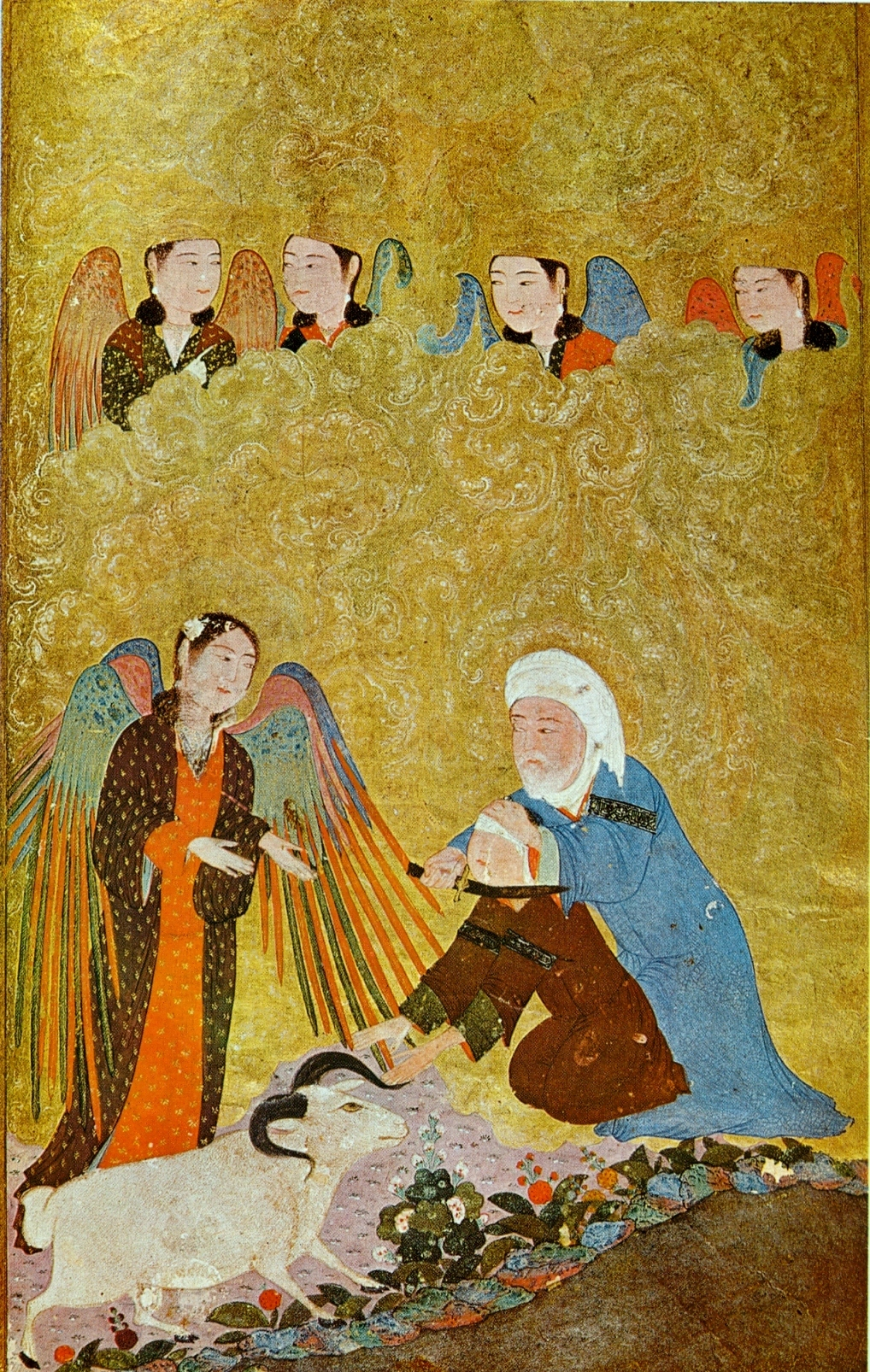
Ibrahim's Sacrifice. Timurid Anthology, 1410–11

The Binding of Ishmael (Arabic: عَقْد إِسْمَاعِيل, romanized: ʿAqd Ismāʿīl) refers to the narrative in Islamic tradition where Abraham is commanded by God to sacrifice his son, generally believed by Muslims to be Ishmael, though the Qur'an does not explicitly name the son. This contrasts with the Tawrat (the Arabic term for the Torah in Islamic context), which identifies Isaac as the son to be sacrificed in the Binding of Isaac. The story, known as the dhabih in Islamic tradition, is believed to have originated as an oral narrative, marked by variability and creative flexibility across versions, as noted by scholar Norman Calder. The narrative holds significant theological and cultural importance in Islam, particularly in relation to Eid al-Adha and the themes of obedience and sacrifice.

=== Construction of the Kaaba in Mecca ===
At some point, often believed to be after Hagar's death, Ishmael married a woman from the Jurhum, the tribe who settled in the area around Zamzam. Abraham visited Ishmael in Mecca and when he arrived at his home, Ishmael was not there. Instead Ishmael's wife greets Abraham, but she was not welcoming or generous to him. Abraham instructed her to tell Ishmael some version of the statement that he was not pleased with or to change "the threshold of his door." When Ishmael returns home and his wife told him that, he knows it is from his father and taking the advice, divorced the woman. He then married another woman from Jurhum. Abraham once again visited and was met by Ishmael's second wife, as Ishmael was out. This wife was very kind and provided food for him. Abraham instructed her to tell Ishmael some version of the statement that he was pleased with "the threshold of his door." When Ishmael arrived and his wife repeated Abraham's statement, Ishmael knew it was from his father and kept his wife.

There are many versions of the construction of the Kaaba that differ in fairly significant ways, although all have Abraham build or cleanse the Kaaba and then immediately after, or at an unknown time, God called Abraham to establish the Hajj, or pilgrimage. These narratives differ in when these events occurred, if and how there was supernatural involvement, the inclusion or omission of the Black Stone, and whether Ishmael assisted his father. Of those that say Ishmael took part in the construction, most describe Abraham visited Ishmael a third time in Mecca, during which they raised the Kaaba. Some say Ishmael looked for a final stone, but Abraham did not accept the one he brought back. Instead an angel had brought the Black Stone, which Abraham put into place. Ishmael was left at the Kaaba, in charge of its care and to teach others about the Hajj. The starting of the Hajj has many versions, and some scholars believe this reflects the late association of Abraham with the Hajj after Islam had developed to help remove its connection to early pagan rituals.

== In Islamic thought ==
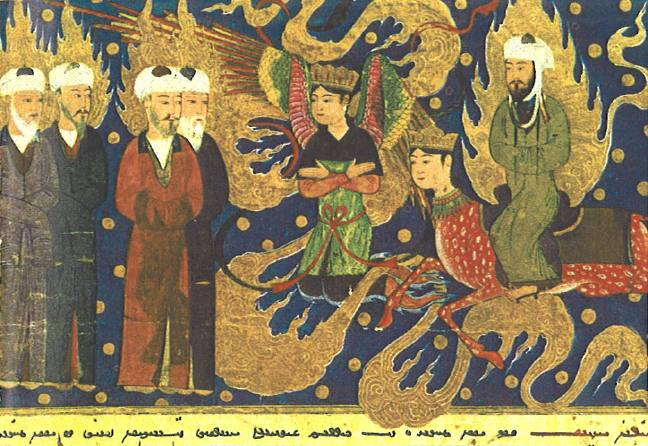
Muhammed meets the prophets Isma'il, Ishaq and Lot in Paradise. From the Apocalypse of Muhammad, written in 1436 in Herat, Afghanistan

=== Prophetic career ===
Ishmael is considered a prophet in Islam and is listed in the Quran with other prophets in many instances. In other verses, such as 21:85 and 38:48, Ishmael is praised for being patient, good, and righteous. A particular example which describes Ishmael individually is 19:54-55 – "And call to mind, through this divine writ, Ishmael. Behold, he was always true to his promise, and was an apostle [of God], a prophet, who used to enjoin upon his people prayer and charity, and found favour in his Sustainer's sight." As a descendant of Ishmael, Muhammad is the Prophet and continues the line of prophets from ancient times.

=== Genealogy: forefather of the Arabs ===
Ishmael's place as the "founder of the Arabs" was first stated by Josephus. As Islam became established, the figure Ishmael and those descended from him, the Ishmaelites, became connected, and often equated, with the term Arab in early Jewish and Christian literature. Before Islam developed as a religion, Ishmael was depicted in many ways, but after its establishment, Ishmael was almost always seen in a negative light in Jewish and Christian texts, as he becomes the symbol for the "other" in these religions. As the Islamic community became more powerful, some Jewish midrash about Ishmael was modified so that he was portrayed more negatively in order to challenge the Islamic view that Ishmael, and thus the Muslims, were the favoured descendants of Abraham. This became the genealogy according to Jewish sources and the Bible, in contrast with the genealogy of Arabs according to Muslims. The development of Islam created pressure for Islam to be somehow different from Judaism and Christianity, and accordingly, Ishmael's lineage to Arabs was stressed.

Today, some Christians believe that God fulfills his promises to Ishmael today by blessing the Arab nations with oil and political strength. In pre-Islamic times, there were three distinct groups of Arabs- the Ba'ida, Ariba, and Musta'riba. The Ba'ida were the "legendary Arabs of the past," while the Ariba were the "Southern Arabs." Ishmael's descendants became the Northern Arabs known as the Musta'riba or the "Arabized Arabs." The Musta'riba were described as Arabized since it is believed Ishmael learned Arabic when he moved to Mecca and married into the Arabic tribe of Jurhum. Ishmael's line is then traced from his son Kedar, then down through to Adnan, then to the Musta'riba, to the Quraysh. In this manner, Muhammad's ancestry leads back to Ishmael, joining "original biblical ancestry of Abraham with a distinctively Arab afinal stock," and connecting Muhammad with Mecca and the Kaaba.

== See also ==
- Abraham in Islam
- Binding of Isaac
- Muhammad in Islam
