= Harran (biblical place) =

Ancient city in Upper Mesopotamia

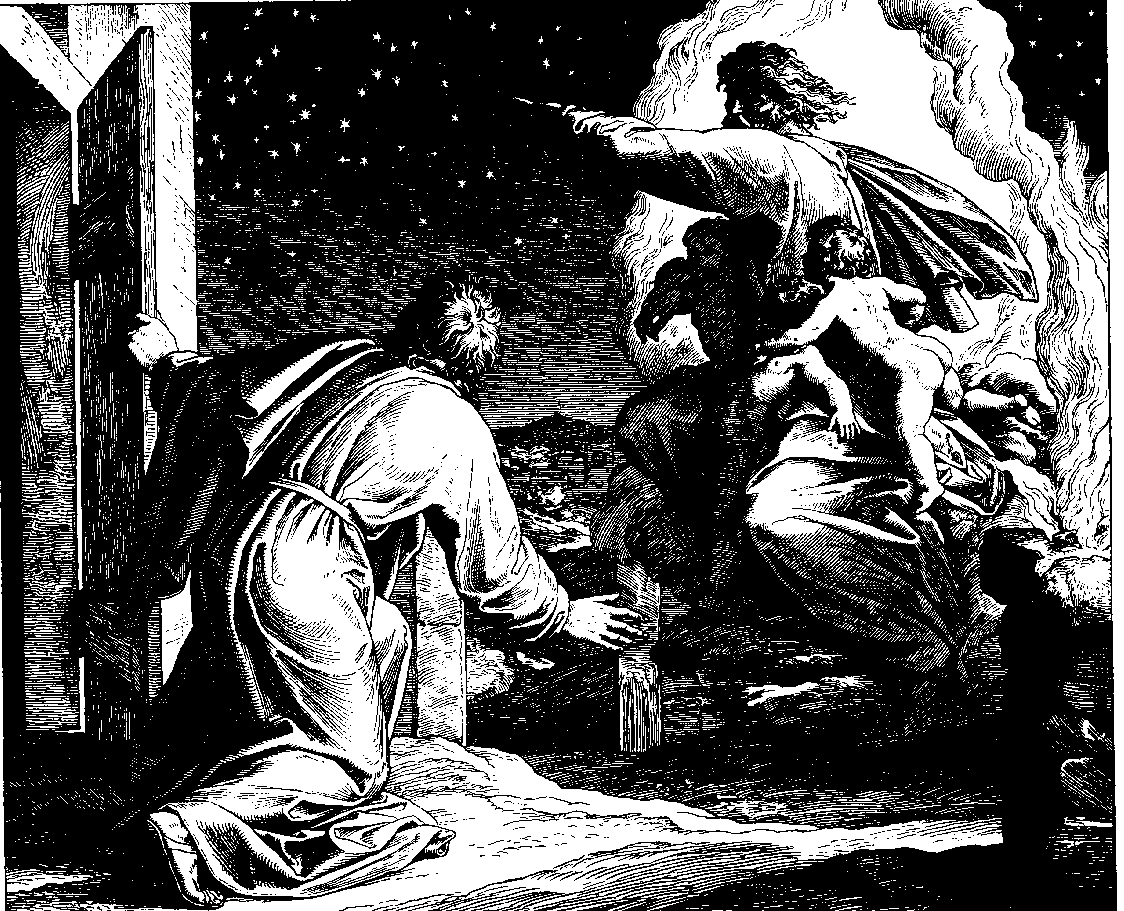
Abram Leaves Haran, 1860 woodcut by Julius Schnorr von Karolsfeld

Harran (Hebrew: חָרָן, Ḥārān) is a city mentioned in the Hebrew Bible, whose ruins might be in the city of Harran, which lie within present-day Turkey. Haran first appears in the Book of Genesis as the home of Terah and his descendants, and as Abraham's temporary home. Later biblical passages list Haran among some cities and lands subjugated by Assyrian rulers and among Tyre's trading partners.

== Name ==
Although the placename can be found in English as Haran, Charan, and Charran, it should not be confused with the personal name Haran, one of Abram's two brothers. The biblical placename is חָרָן (with a ḥet) in Hebrew, pronounced [ħaːraːn] and can mean "parched," but is more likely to mean "road" or "crossroad," cognate to Old Babylonian ḫaranu (MSL 09, 124-137 r ii 54'). The personal name Haran is spelled הָרָן (with a hei) in Hebrew and means "mountaineer".

== Identification ==
Location of Haran and other associated Biblical/Torah sites

Haran is usually identified with Harran, now a village of Şanlıurfa, Turkey. Since the 1950s, archeological excavations of Harran have been conducted, which have yielded insufficient discoveries about the site's pre-medieval history or of its supposed patriarchal age. The earliest records of Harran come from the Ebla tablets, c. 2300 BC. Harran's name is said to be from Akkadian ḫarrānum (fem.), "road"; ḫarrānātum (pl.).

== Biblical mentions ==
According to the Hebrew Bible, Haran was the place where Terah settled with his son Abraham (at that time called Abram), his grandson Lot, Abram's wife Sarah (at that time known as Sarai) during their planned journey from Ur Kaśdim (Ur of the Chaldees) to the Land of Canaan. Some interpreters like Nahmanides argue that Abraham was actually born in Haran and only later relocated to Ur before stopping in Haran en route to Canaan.

Abram lived there until he was 75 years old before continuing on to Canaan, in response to the command of God. Although Abram's nephew Lot accompanied him to Canaan, Terah and his other descendants remained in Paddan-Aram.

The region of Haran is referred to variously as Paddan Aram and Aram-Naharaim. In Genesis 28:10–19, Abraham's grandson Jacob left Beersheba and went toward Haran. Along the way he had his dream of Jacob's Ladder.

In 2 Kings (19:12) and Isaiah (37:12) Haran reappears in the late 8th to early 7th century BC context of the Neo-Assyrian Empire's conquests. It appears again in the Book of Ezekiel (27:23) as a former trading partner of the Phoenician city Tyre. In the New Testament, Haran is mentioned in the Acts of the Apostles (7:2–4), in a recounting of the story in Genesis wherein it first appears.

== See also ==
- Sabians
