= Ur of the Chaldees =

Birthplace of Abraham, possibly in Iraq

Ur Kasdim (Hebrew: אוּר כַּשְׂדִּים, romanized: ʾŪr Kaśdīm), commonly translated as Ur of the Chaldees, is a city mentioned in the Hebrew Bible as the birthplace of Abram (later Abraham), the patriarch of the Israelites and the Ishmaelites. In 1862, British East India Company officer Henry Rawlinson identified the location of Ur Kaśdim as Tell el-Muqayyar (Ur) near Nasiriyah in the Baghdad Eyalet of Ottoman Iraq. In 1927, Leonard Woolley excavated there and identified it as a Sumerian archaeological site where the Chaldeans were to settle around the 9th century BCE. More recent archaeologists have continued focus on the Nasiriyah area, where the ancient Ziggurat of Ur is located.

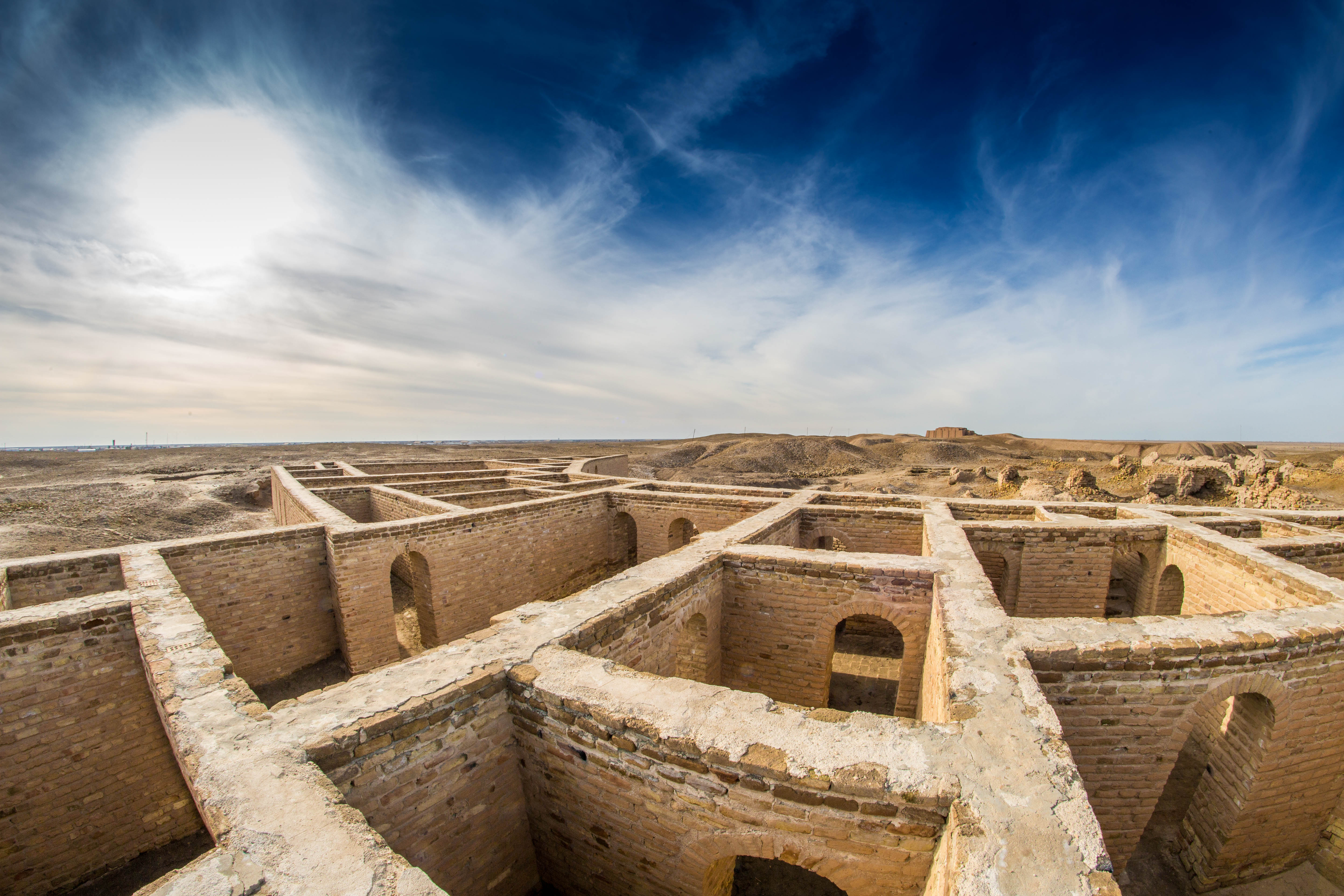
The ruins of Ur, Iraq, the dominant scholarly position for the location of Ur Kaśdim

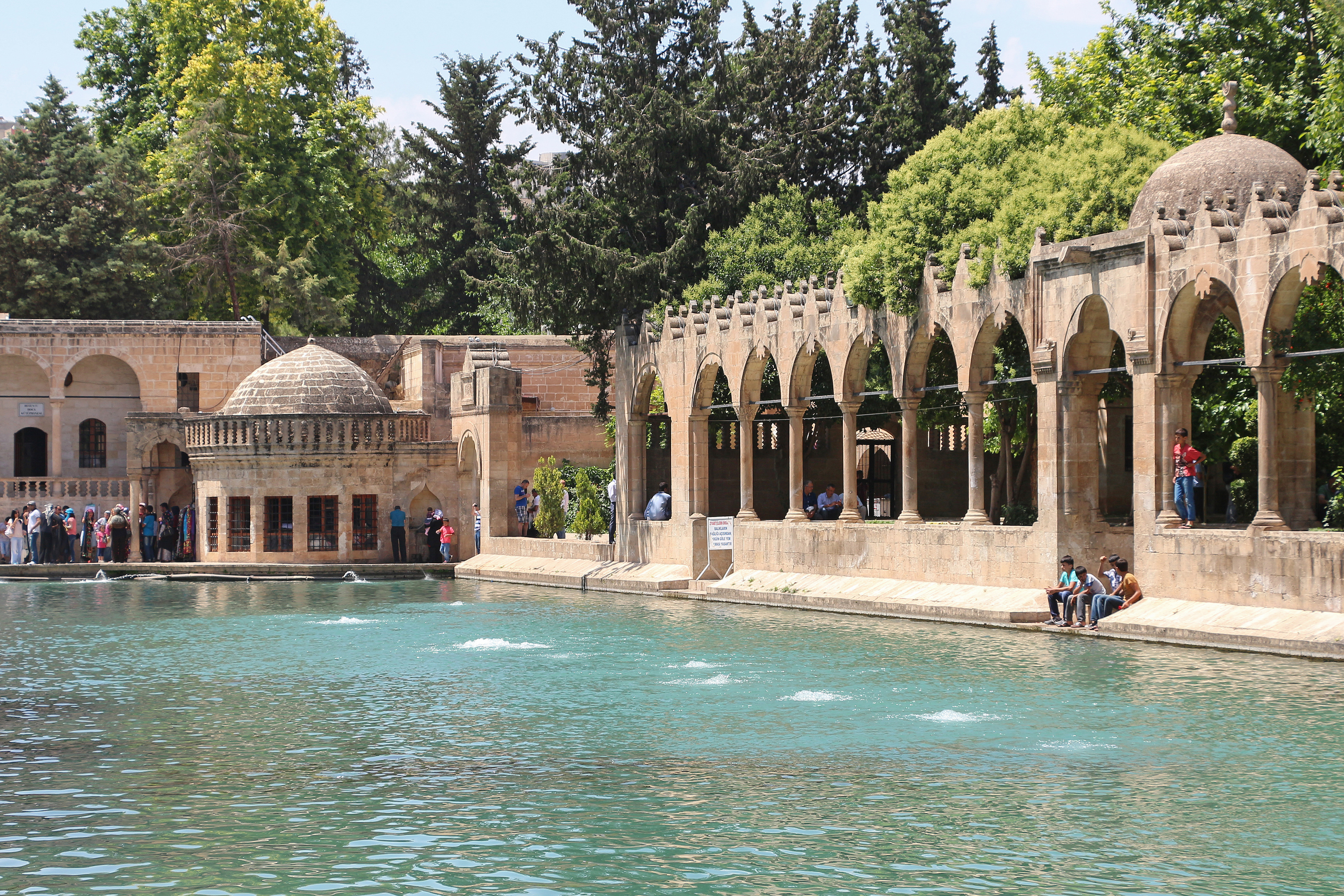
Abraham's Pool heritage site near Urfa, Turkey, an alternative candidate city for Ur Kaśdīm

A site with a local tradition of being Abraham's birthplace Ur Kaśdim and minority scholarly support is Urfa, in the Southeastern Anatolia Region of Turkey (in the vicinity of the city of Edessa).

== In tradition ==
=== Hebrew Bible ===
Ur Kaśdim is mentioned four times in the Hebrew Bible, in the Book of Genesis (Genesis 11:28, Genesis 11:31, Genesis 15:7), and the Book of Nehemiah (Nehemiah 9:7).

The distinction "Kaśdim" is usually rendered in English as "of the Chaldees", or in many cases "of the Chaldeans". Although not explicitly stated in the Tanakh, it is generally understood to be the birthplace of Abraham (although some commentators like Nahmanides understand that Abraham was born in Haran, but later migrated to Ur). Genesis 11:27–28 names it as the death place of Abraham's brother Haran, and the point of departure of Terah's household, including his son Abraham.

In Genesis 12:1, after Abraham and his father Terah have left Ur Kaśdim for the city of Haran (probably Harran), and God instructs Abraham to leave his native land (Hebrew moledet). Genesis 15:7 associates Abram's departure or removal from Ur with the revelation that it was the Lord who brought him away from there.

The traditional Jewish understanding of the word moledet is "birthplace" (e.g. in the Judaica Press translation). Similarly, in Genesis 24:4–10, Abraham instructs his servant to bring a wife for Isaac from his moledet, and the servant departs for Haran.

=== Septuagint ===
The Septuagint translation of Genesis does not include the term "Ur"; instead it describes the "Land of the Chaldees" (Greek χώρα Χαλδαίων, chōra Chaldaiōn). Some scholars have held that biblical Ur was not a city at all, but simply a word for land.

=== Deuterocanonical writings ===
The Book of Judith refers to a people who had migrated from Chaldea:

"This people are descended of the Chaldeans. And they departed from the way of their parents, and worshipped the God of heaven, the God whom they knew: and they cast them out from the face of their gods, and they fled into Mesopotamia, and sojourned there many days. And their God commanded them to depart from the place where they sojourned".

=== Jubilees ===
The Book of Jubilees states that Ur was founded in 1688 Anno Mundi (year of the world) by 'Ur son of Kesed", presumably the offspring of Arpachshad, adding that in this same year wars began on Earth. "And ’Ûr, the son of Kêsêd, built the city of ’Arâ of the Chaldees, and called its name after his own name and the name of his father." (Jubilees 11:3).

=== New Testament ===
In the New Testament, Saint Stephen refers to "the land of the Chaldeans" when he retells the story of Abraham in Acts 7.

== Location ==
=== Lower Mesopotamia ===
Eusebius, in his Preparation for the Gospel, preserves a fragment of the work Concerning the Jews by the 1st century BC historian Alexander Polyhistor, which in turn quotes a passage in Concerning the Jews of Assyria by the 2nd century BC historian Eupolemus. The passage claimed that Abraham was born in the Babylonian city Camarina, which it notes was also called "Uria". (Such indirect quotations of Eupolemus via Polyhistor are referred to as Pseudo-Eupolemus.) This site is identified by modern scholars with the Sumerian city of Ur located at Tell el-Mukayyar, which in ancient texts was named Uriwa or Urima.

==== Woolley's identification of Ur ====
In 1927 Leonard Woolley identified Ur Kaśdim with the Sumerian city of Ur (founded c. 3800 BC), in southern Mesopotamia, where the Chaldeans settled much later (around the 9th century BC); Ur lay on the boundary of the region later called Kaldu (Chaldea, corresponding to Hebrew Kaśdim) in the first millennium BCE. It was the sacred city of the moon god and the name "Camarina" is thought to be related to the much later appearing Arabic word for "moon": qamar. The identification of Sumerian Ur with Ur Kaśdim accords with the view that Abraham's ancestors may have been moon-worshippers, an idea based on the possibility that the name of Abraham's father Terah is related to the Hebrew root for moon (y-r-h).

Woolley's identification has become the mainstream scholarly opinion on the location of Biblical Ur Kasdim, in line with some earlier traditions that placed Ur Kasdim in Southern Mesopotamia. Woolley's identification was challenged with the discovery of the city of Harran in northern Mesopotamia, near the present-day village of Altınbaşak in modern Turkey (archaeological excavations at Harran began in the 1950s).

Recent archaeological work focuses on the area of Nasiriyah (in southern Iraq), where the remains of the ancient Ziggurat of Ur stand.

==== Identification with Uruk ====
According to T.G. Pinches and A.T. Clay, some Talmudic and medieval Arabic writers identified Ur of the Chaldees with the Sumerian city of Uruk, called Erech in the Bible and Warka in Arabic. Both scholars reject the equation. Talmud Yoma 10a identifies Erech with a place called "Urichus", and no tradition exists equating Ur Kaśdim with Urichus or Erech/Uruk.

=== Upper Mesopotamia ===
Some Jewish traditions identify Abraham's birthplace as somewhere in Upper Mesopotamia. This view was particularly noted by Nachmanides (Ramban). Nevertheless, this interpretation of moledet as meaning "birthplace" is not universal. Many Pentateuchal translations, from the Septuagint to some modern English versions, render moledet as "kindred" or "family".

Writing in the 4th century AD, Ammianus Marcellinus in his Rerum Gestarum Libri mentions a castle named Ur which lay between Hatra and Nisibis. A. T. Clay understood this as an identification of Ur Kaśdim, although Marcellinus makes no explicit claim in this regard. In her Travels, Egeria, recording travels dated to the early 380s AD, mentions Hur lying five stations from Nisibis on the way to Persia, apparently the same location, and she does identify it with Ur Kaśdim. However, the castle in question was only founded during the time of the second Persian Empire (224–651).

Since Upper Mesopotamia included northern Syria, which was inhabited by groups like the Amorites, some even consider Abraham to be among the Amorites that migrated to the Levant. Like Abraham and his descendants, the Amorites followed shepherding-based lifestyles. Nonetheless, the Biblical authors distanced themselves from the Amorites to assert their moral superiority.

==== Tradition of Sanliurfa ====
Another possible location for Ur of the Chaldees (Ur Kasdim) is the ancient Assyrian and Seleucid city Edessa, now called Şanlıurfa. According to some Jewish traditions, this is the site where Abraham was cast into a furnace by Nimrod as punishment for his monotheistic beliefs, but miraculously escaped unscathed.

The Turkish name for the city, Urfa, is derived from the earlier Syriac ܐܘܪܗܝ (Orhāy) and Greek Ορρα (Orrha), the city being a major centre of Assyrian-Syriac Christianity.

Islamic tradition holds that the site of Abraham's birth is a cave situated near the center of Şanlıurfa. The Halil-Ur Rahman Mosque lies in the vicinity of the cave.

Gary A. Rendsburg points out that this location makes better sense of the Biblical references, especially that if Teraḥ and family left Ur-Kasdim to travel to Canaan, but stopped en route in Ḥarran, then the location of Ur-Kasdim should be to the north of Ḥarran. In addition, Abraham's grandfather Nahor and great-grandfather Serug share names with cities located near Ḥarran in northern Mesopotamia ("Til-Nahiri" and Suruç), suggesting that Abraham's clan was well established in this area in the period before the migration from Ur-Kasdim.

==== Urkesh ====
According to A. S. Issar, Ur Kasdim is identified with the site of Urkesh – the capital of the Hurrian Kingdom, now in northeastern Syria. It is further hypothesized that the Biblical travel of Abraham's kin from Urkesh to Harran in order to reach Canaan is much more reasonable than a travel from the Sumerian city of Ur.
