= Joseph in Islam =

Prophet and son of Jacob in Islam

Prophet Yūsuf Alayhi as-Salam
- يُوسُف; Joseph
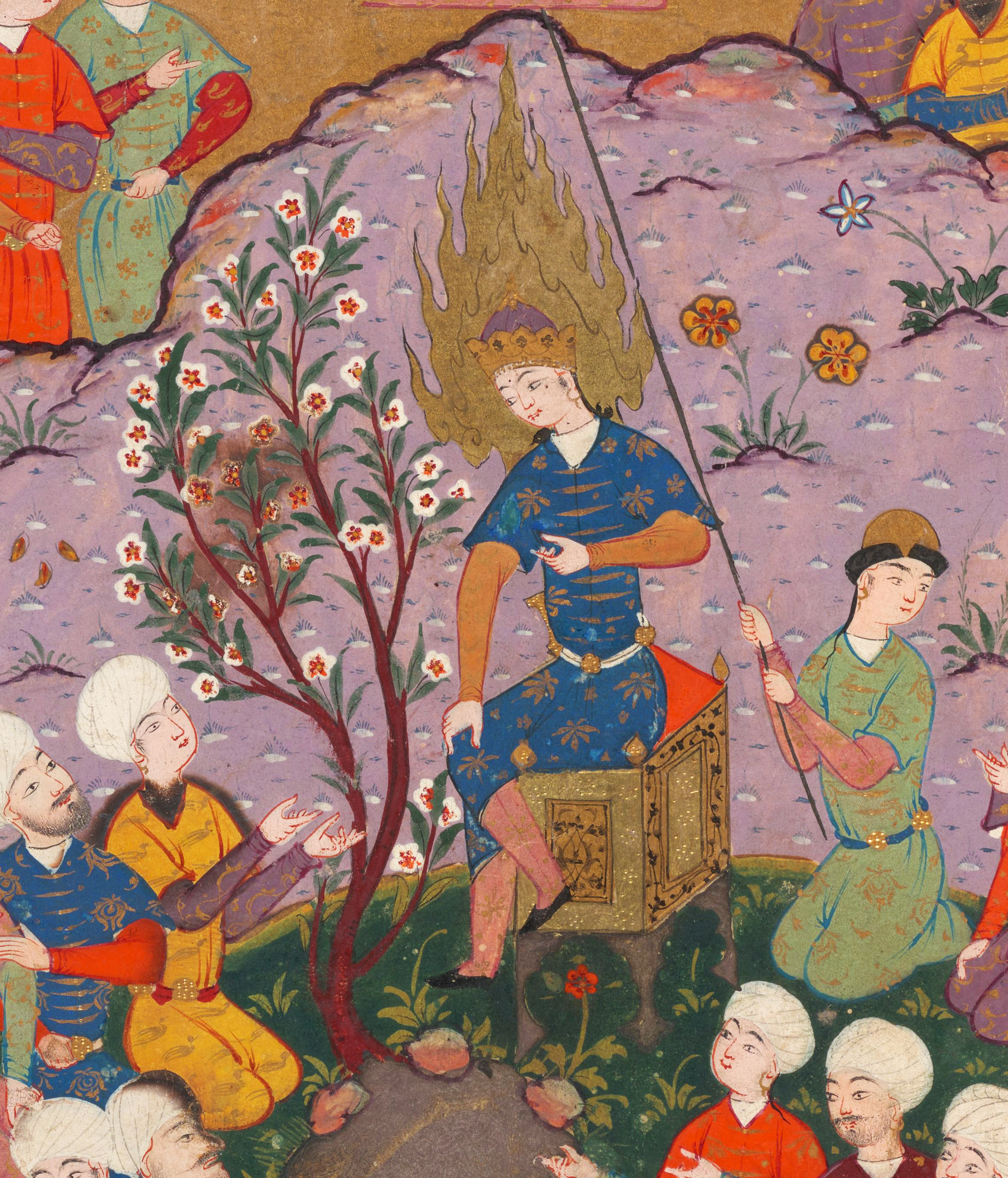
- Yusuf enthroned as governor in Egypt.

Prophet of Islam
- Preceded by: Yaqub
- Succeeded by: Ayyub

Governor of Egypt
- In office 1717 BCE – 1637 BCE

Personal life
- Born: Yusuf ibn Yaqub ibn Ishaq ibn Ibrahim; 1747 BCE Palestine
- Died: 1637 BCE (aged 110) Egypt
- Resting place: Cave of the Patriarchs, Hebron, West Bank
- Spouse: Asenath (Unconfirmed and unknown in Islamic tradition
- Parent: Ya'qub (father)

Religious life
- Religion: Islam

Yusuf (Arabic: يُوْسُف ٱبْن يَعْقُوْب ٱبْن إِسْحَاق ٱبْن إِبْرَاهِيْم, romanized: Yūsuf ibn Yaʿqūb ibn ʾIs-ḥāq ibn ʾIbrāhīm, lit. 'Yusuf, son of Ya'qub, son of Is-haq, son of Ibrahim') is a prophet and messenger of God mentioned in the Qur'an and corresponds to Joseph, a person from the Hebrew and Christian Bible who was said to have lived in Egypt before the New Kingdom. Amongst Yaqub's children, Yusuf reportedly had the gift of prophecy through dreams. Although the narratives of other prophets are presented in a number of surah, Yusuf's complete narrative appears in only one: Yusuf. Said to be the most detailed narrative in the Quran, it mentions details that do not appear in its biblical counterpart.

Yusuf is believed to have been the eleventh son of Ya'qub (Arabic: يعقوب) and, according to a number of scholars, his favorite. Ibn Kathir wrote, "Yaqub had twelve sons who were the eponymous ancestors of the tribes of the Israelites. The noblest, the most exalted, the greatest of them was Yusuf." The narrative begins with Yusuf revealing a dream to his father, which Yaqub recognizes. In addition to the role of God in his life, the story of Yusuf and Zulaikha (Al-Aziz(Potiphar)'s wife in the Old Testament) became a popular subject of Persian literature and was elaborated over centuries.

== In the Qur'an ==
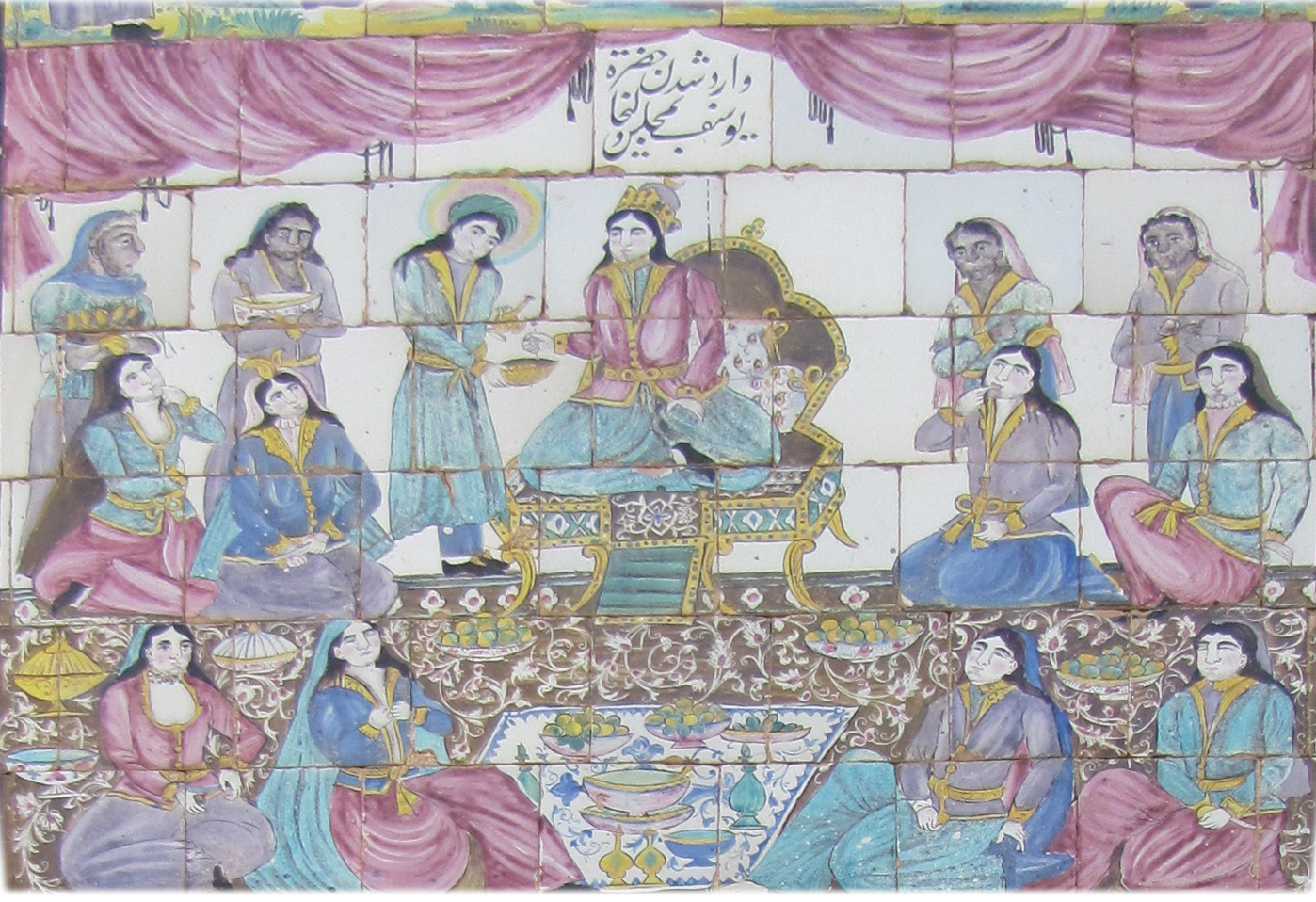
Yusuf at Zuleikha's party. Decorated tiles in the Takyeh Moaven-ol-Molk in Kermanshah, Iran

The story of Yusuf in the Qurʾān is a continuous narrative in its twelfth chapter, named Surah Yusuf (Arabic: يوسف سُورَة, lit. 'the chapter of Yusuf'). There are over one hundred verses in this chapter, encompassing many years; they "present an amazing variety of sciences and characters in a tightly-knit plot, and offer a dramatic illustration of some of the fundamental themes of the Qurʾān." The Qur'an notes the story's importance in the third verse: "and We narrate unto you aḥsanal-qaṣaṣ (Arabic: أحسن ٱلقصص, lit. 'best (or most beautiful) of stories')" (Qur'an, 12:3). Most scholars believe that this refers to Yusuf's story; others, including al-Tabari, believe that it refers to the Qur'an as a whole. It documents the execution of God's rulings despite the challenge of human intervention ("And God hath full power and control over His affairs; but most among mankind know it not").

=== Before the dream ===
Muhammad al-Ṭabari provides detailed commentary on the narrative in his chapter on Yusuf, relaying the opinions of other well-known scholars. In al-Ṭabari's chapter, the physical beauty of Yusuf and his mother Rahyl is introduced; they were said to have had "more beauty than any other human being." His father, Yaqub(Yaqub), had given him to his (Yaqub's) oldest sister to be raised. Al-Ṭabari writes that there was no greater love than what Yusuf's aunt felt for him, since she raised him as her own; reluctant to return him to Yaqub. According to al-Ṭabari, she could do this because of a belt given to her by her father, Is-haq(Issac) (Isaac): "If someone else acquired it by guile from the person who was supposed to have it, then he would become absolutely subject to the will of the rightful owner." Yusuf's aunt puts the belt on Yusuf when Yaqub is absent; she accuses Yusuf of stealing it, and he remains with her until her death. Yaqub is reluctant to give Yusuf up, and favors him when they are together.

=== The dream ===
The narrative begins with a dream, and ends with its interpretation. As the sun appeared over the horizon, bathing the earth in morning glory, Yusuf (son of Yaqub) awakens delighted by a pleasant dream. Filled with excitement, he runs to his father and reports what he saw.

Joseph said to his father: "O my father! I did see eleven stars and the sun and the moon: I saw them prostrate themselves to me!

— Qur'an 12:4

According to Ibn Kathir, Yaqub knows that Yusuf will become important in this world and the next. He recognizes that the stars represent his brothers; the sun and moon represent himself and Yusuf's mother, Rahyl(Rachel) (Arabic: راشيل). Yaqub tells Yusuf to keep the dream secret to protect him from the jealousy of his brothers, who are unhappy with Yaqub's love for Yusuf. He foresees that Yusuf will be the one through whom the prophecy of his grandfather, Ibrahim, would be fulfilled: his offspring would keep the light of Abraham's house alive and spread God's message to mankind. Abu Ya'ala interpreted Yaqub's reaction as an understanding that the planets, sun, and moon bowing to Yusuf represented "something dispersed which God united." Yaqub tells Yusuf, "My son, relate not thy vision to thy brothers, lest they concoct a plot against thee: for Satan is a clear enemy to humanity. Thus your Lord has selected you and given you the knowledge to interpret dreams, and has perfected His blessing upon you and upon the family of Yaqub just as He perfected it on your forefathers before: Ibrahim and Is-haq (Isaac). Your Lord is Knowing, Wise" (Qur'an, Surah 12 (Yusuf) Ayat 5–6).

Yusuf does not tell his brothers about his dream (unlike the Hebrew Bible version), but they remain very jealous. Al-Ṭabari writes that they said to each other, "Verily Yusuf and his brother (Binyamin) are dearer to our father than we are, though we may be a troop ('usbah). By 'usbah (Arabic: عُصۡبَةٌ) they meant a strong group, for they were ten in number. They said, "Our father is plainly in a state of aberration." Yusuf has a gentle temperament and is respectful, kind, and considerate, like his brother Binyamin (Arabic: بنيامين); both are Rahyl(Rachel)'s sons. From amongst the ahadith (Arabic: أحاديث, romanized: aḥādīth, lit. 'narration'), one states:

Narrated Abu Huraira: Some people asked the Prophet: "Who is the most honorable amongst the people?" He replied, "The most honorable among them is the one who is the most Allah-fearing." They said, "O Allah's prophet! We do not ask about this." He said, "Then the most honorable person is Joseph, Allah's prophet, the son of a Allah's prophet, the son of a Allah's prophet, the son of Allah's Khalil (Arabic: خليل الله, lit. 'Friend of God')."

— Sahih al-Bukhari, collected by Muhammad al-Bukhari

=== Plot against him ===
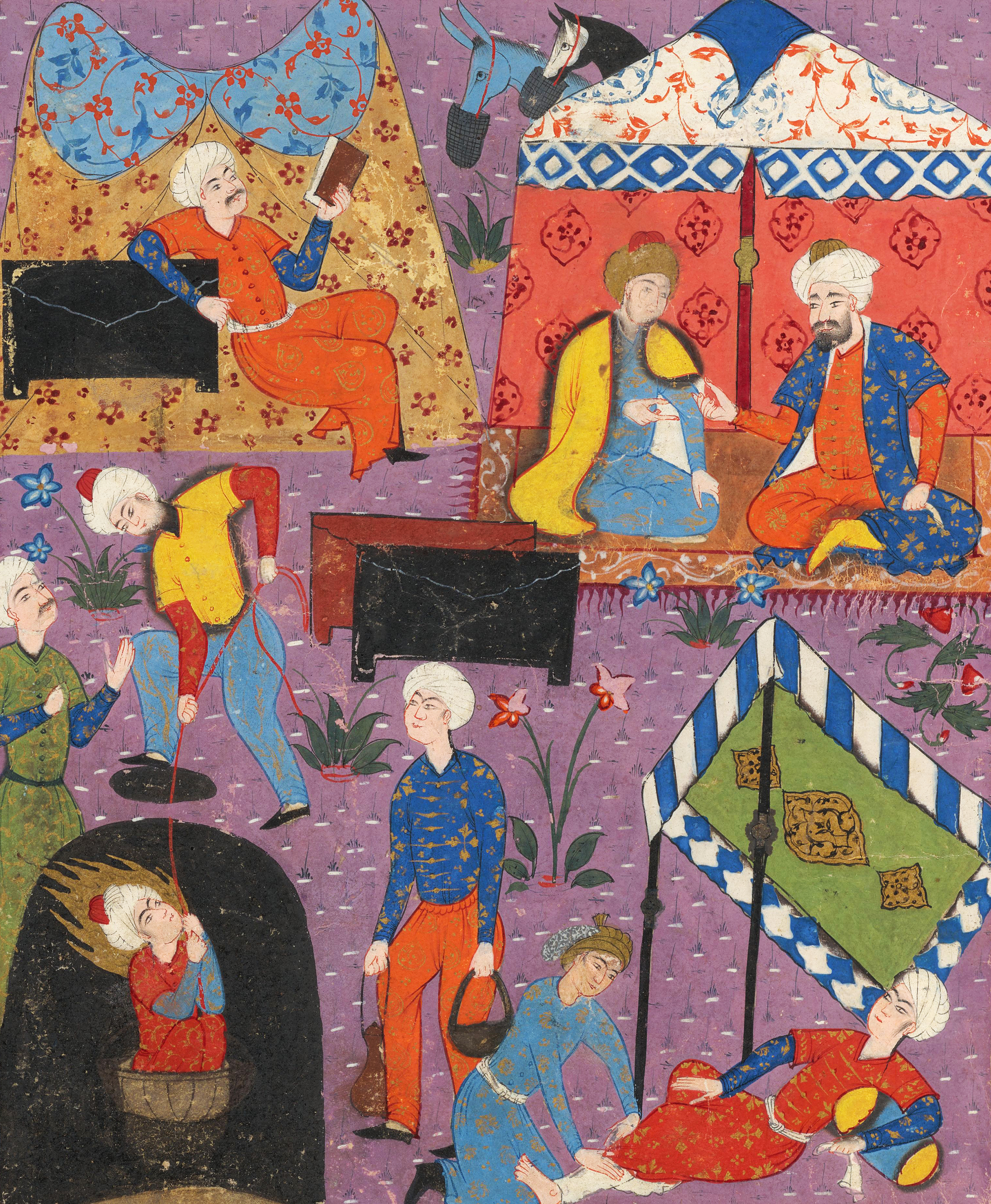
Yusuf being lowered into a well by his brothers from a Persian 1577 Qiṣaṣ al-Anbiyāʾ manuscript.

The Qur'an continues with Yusuf's brothers plotting to kill him: "In Yusuf and his brothers are signs for those who seek answers" (Qur'an, 12:7). Yusuf's brothers said about him: "He is more loved by our father than we are, and we are a group. Our father is in clear error. Let us kill Yusuf or cast him to the ground, so that your father's face will be toward you, and after him you will be a community of the truthful". One brother argues against killing him and suggests throwing him into a well (said to be Jubb Yusif (Arabic: جب يوسف, lit. 'Well of Joseph')), where a caravan might rescue and enslave him: "Slay not Yusuf, but if ye must do something, throw him down to the bottom of the well: he will be picked up by some caravan of travelers". Islamic scholar Mujahid ibn Jabr identifies the brother as Simeon. Another scholar, al-Suddi, identifies him as Judah, and Qatada ibn al-Nu'man writes that it was the eldest, Reuben. Scholars suggest that Yusuf may have been as young as twelve when he was thrown into the well. He would live to be 110 or 120.

The brothers ask their father to let them take Yusuf into the desert to play, and promise to watch him. Yaqub hesitates, aware of their resentment towards their brother. Yaqub's excuse is that a wolf (Arabic: ذئب, romanized: dhi'b) might hurt him while they are not paying attention. The brothers insist on their strength, calling themselves losers if they are not able to protect Yusuf. With their father convinced, they throw Yusuf into a well. They return with a blood-stained shirt, saying that he had been attacked by a wolf, but unlike in the biblical narrative, Yaqub does not believe them. According to the Quran

They said: "O our father! why dost thou not trust us with Joseph, – seeing we are indeed his sincere well-wishers?
Send him with us tomorrow to enjoy himself and play, and we shall take every care of him."
(Jacob) said: "Really it saddens me that ye should take him away: I fear lest the wolf should devour him while ye attend not to him."
They said: "If the wolf were to devour him while we are (so large) a party, then should we indeed (first) have perished ourselves!"
So they did take him away, and they all agreed to throw him down to the bottom of the well: and We put into his heart (this Message): 'Of a surety thou shalt (one day) tell them the truth of this their affair while they know (thee) not'
Then they came to their father in the early part of the night, weeping.
They said: "O our father! We went racing with one another, and left Joseph with our things; and the wolf devoured him.... But thou wilt never believe us even if we tell the truth."
They stained his shirt with false blood. He said: "Nay, but your minds have made up a tale (that may pass) with you, (for me) patience is most fitting: Against that which ye assert, it is God (alone) Whose help can be sought"...

— Qur'an, Surah 12 (Yusuf) Ayat 11–18

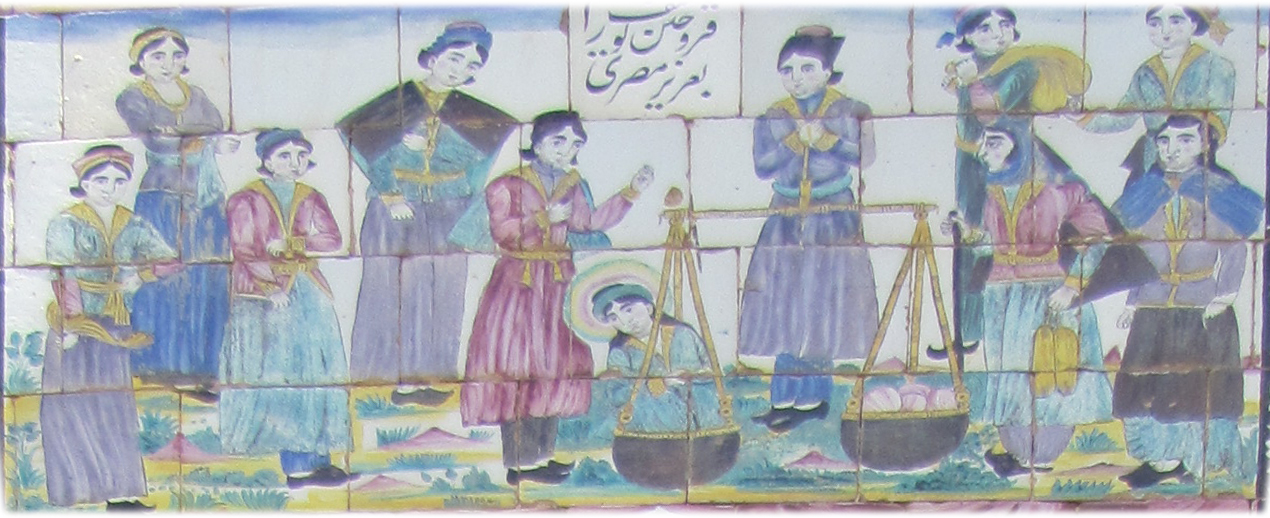
Selling Yusuf as a slave. Painted tiles in the Takyeh Moaven–ol–molk, Kermanshah, Iran

Al-Ṭabari writes that Judah stops the brothers from further harming Yusuf, and brings him food. Ibn Kathir writes that Reuben suggested that they put him in the well so he could return later to bring him home. When he returns, Yusuf is gone: "So he screamed and tore his clothes. He put blood on the coat of Yusuf. When Yaqub learned of this, he tore his clothes, wore a black cloak, and was sad for many days". Ibn Abbas writes that the "reason for this trial of Yaqub was that he had slaughtered a sheep while he was fasting. He asked a neighbor of his to eat it but he did not. So God tested him with the matter of Yusuf." He interprets Yusuf's revelation in the well: "When they were unaware" (12:15) means "you will tell them about what they did in a situation in which they will not recognize you." A possible reason for Yusuf's enslavement was that after Abraham left Egypt with slaves, "Abraham did not dismount for them (following barefoot). Therefore God revealed to him: 'Since you did not alight for the slaves and those walking barefoot with you, I will punish you by selling one of your descendants into his country.'"

=== Divine intervention ===
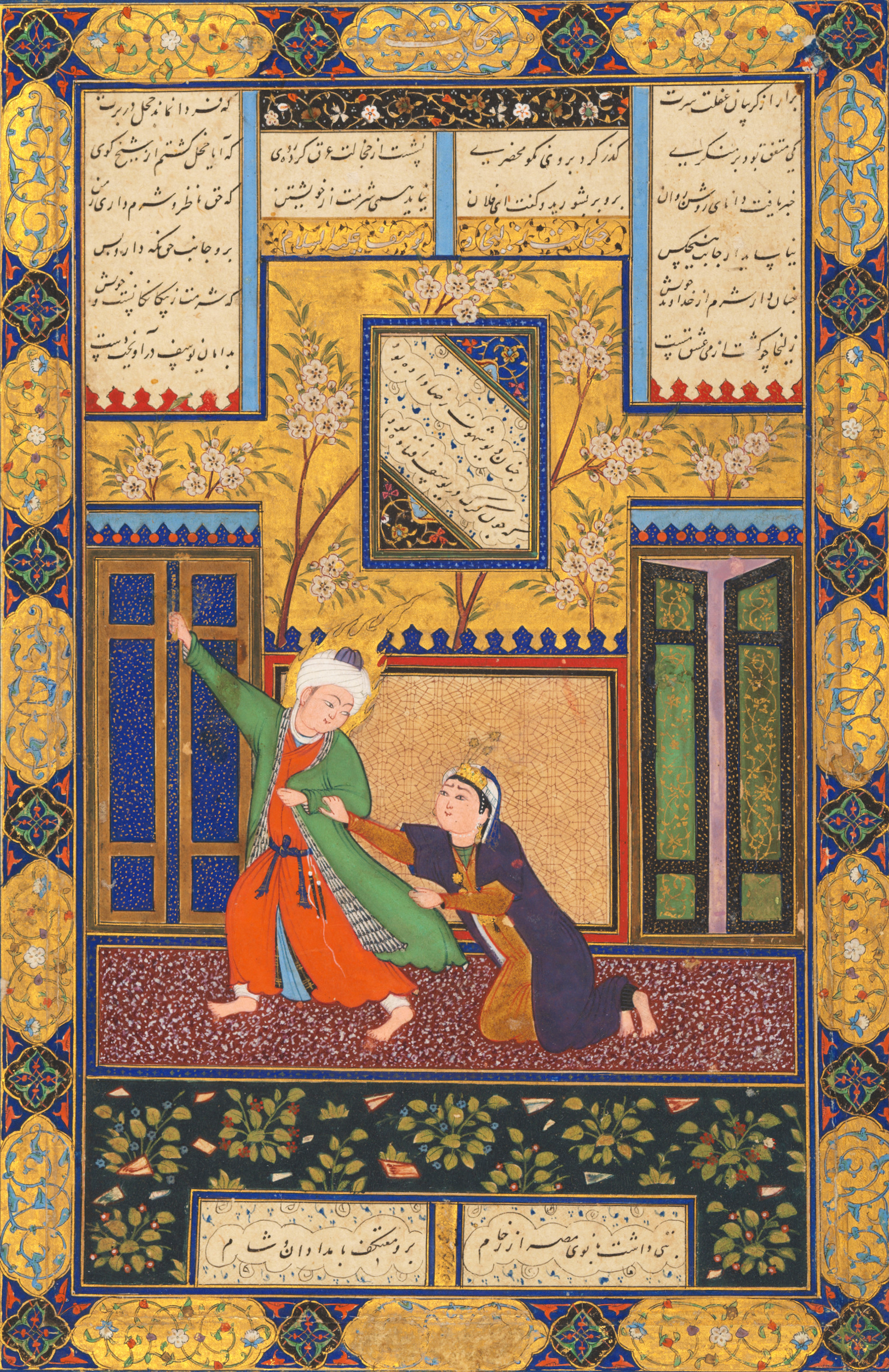
Yusuf and Zulaikha (Yusuf chased by Potiphar's wife), Persian miniature

A passing caravan takes Yusuf after it stops by the well to draw water and sees the boy inside. The brothers, nearby, sell Yusuf for a very low price, only wanting to get rid of him. The caravan rescue him and sell him into slavery in Misr (Arabic: مصر, Egypt), to a rich man, the King’s vizier, known as Al-'Aziz (Arabic: ٱلعزيز, lit. 'the dear one') in the Quran and Potiphar in the Bible. 'Aziz is also known as Qatafir or Qittin. Yusuf is taken into 'Aziz's home, and the man tells his wife to treat him well.

Then there came a caravan of travellers: they sent their water-carrier (for water), and he let down his bucket (into the well) ... He said: "Ah there! Good news! Here is a (fine) young man!" So they concealed him as a treasure. But God knoweth well all that they do.
The (Brethren) sold him for a miserable price, for a few dirhams counted out: in such low estimation did they hold him!
The man in Egypt who bought him, said to his wife: "Make his stay (among us) honourable: maybe he will bring us much good, or we shall adopt him as a son." Thus did We establish Joseph in the land, that We might teach him the interpretation of dreams (and events). And God hath full power and control over His affairs; but most among mankind know it not.
When Joseph attained His full manhood, We gave him power and knowledge: thus do We reward those who do right.

— Qur'an, Surah 12 (Yusuf) Ayat 19–22

Scholars of Islam cite this point as central to Yusuf's story. Yusuf rises to a high position in Al-'Aziz's household and, when his brothers later come to Egypt, they do not recognize him. He reaches manhood, and 'Aziz's wife tries to seduce him. Al-Tabari and others note that Yusuf is also attracted to her, and al-Ṭabari writes that he does not succumb to her because when they were alone, the "figure of Yaqub appeared to him, standing in the house and biting his fingers ... God turned him away from his desire for evil by giving him a sign that he should not do it."

But she in whose house he was, sought to seduce him from his (true) self: she fastened the doors, and said: "Now come, thou (dear one)!" He said: "Allah forbid! Truly (thy husband) is my lord! He made my sojourn agreeable! Truly to no good come those who do wrong!"
And (with passion) did she desire him, and he would have desired her, but that he saw the evidence of his Lord: thus (did We order) that We might turn away from him (all) evil and shameful deeds: for he was one of Our servants, sincere and purified.

— Qur'an, Surah 12 (Yusuf) Ayat 23–24

Zulaikha, the wife of Al-'Aziz, rips the back of Yusuf's shirt as they race one another to the door where her husband is waiting. She tries to blame Yusuf, suggesting that he had attacked her, but Yusuf's account of Zulaikha's attempted seduction is confirmed by a member of the household; "'Azīz believed Yusuf and told his wife to beg forgiveness." The household member tells 'Aziz to check Yusuf's shirt. If the front is torn, Yusuf is guilty; if the back is torn, Zulaikha is guilty. The shirt is torn in the back, and 'Aziz reprimands his wife for lying.

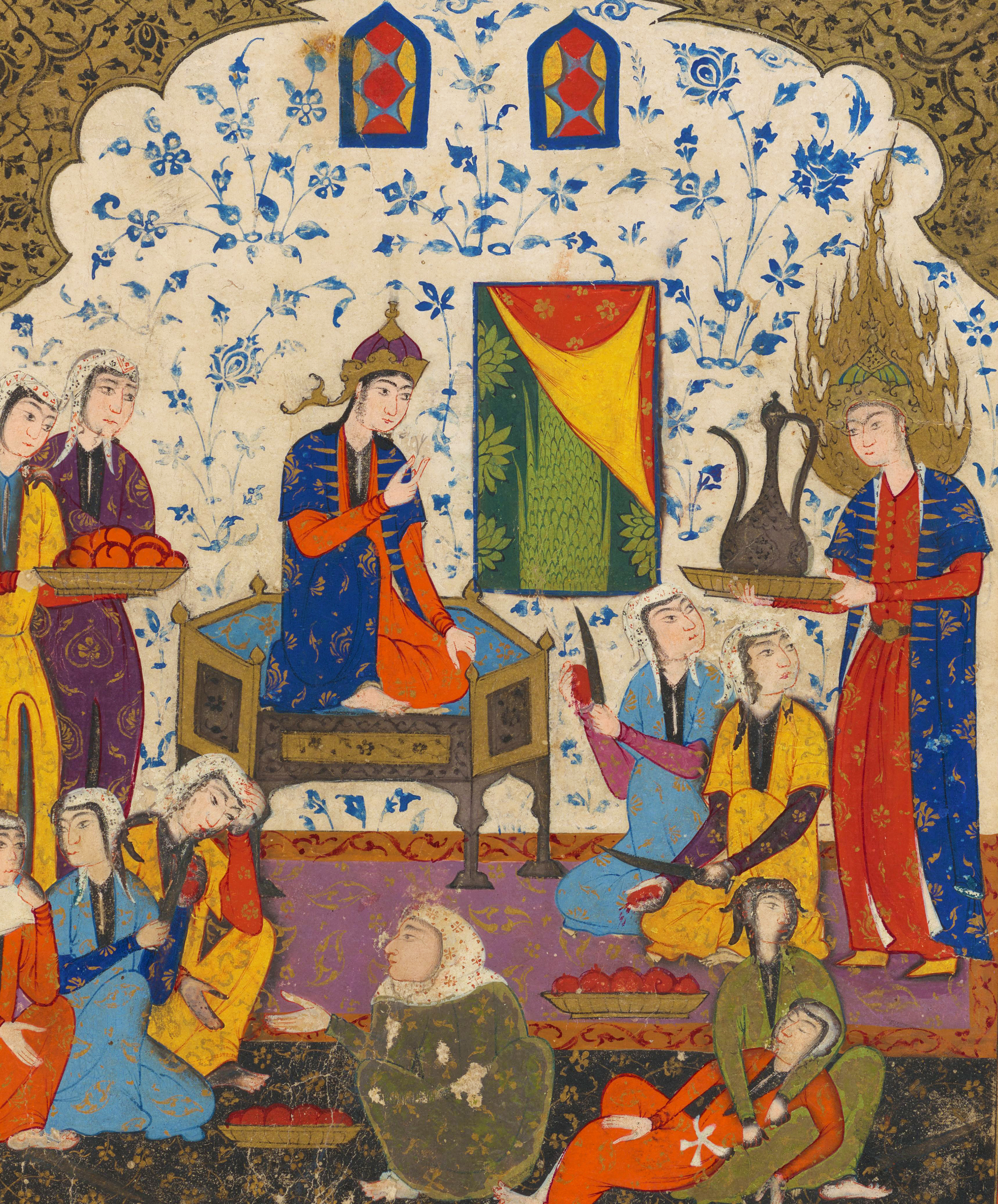
Islamic illustration of the manservant, Yusuf, carrying wine to the banquet. His prophetic beauty distracts women, making them cut into their flesh and it causes others to faint

Zulaikha's friends think that she is infatuated with Yusuf, and ridicule her for falling in love with a slave. She invites them to her home, and gives them apples and knives to peel them with. Zulaikha then has Yusuf walk through the room; the women are so distracted by his handsomeness that they cut their fingers with the knives, and she says that she sees Yusuf every day. Yusuf prays, saying that he would prefer prison to succumbing to Zulaikha and her friends. According to al-Ṭabari, 'Aziz later "grew disgusted with himself for having let Yusuf go free ... It seemed good to them to imprison him for a time." The popular story of Yusuf and Zulaikha differs in the Quran from the Biblical version, in which Potiphar believes his wife and imprisons Yusuf. According to some scholars, after 'Aziz's death, Yusuf reportedly marries Zulaikha.

=== Dream interpretation ===
This account refers to the interaction between Yusuf and the ruler of Egypt. Unlike references to the pharaoh in the account of Moses, the story of Yusuf refers to the Egyptian ruler as a king (Arabic: ملك, romanized: malik) rather than a pharaoh (Arabic: فرعون, romanized: fir'aun). After Yusuf had been imprisoned for a few years, God gives Yusuf the ability to interpret dreams, a power which makes him popular amongst the other prisoners. Before his imprisonment, two royal servants had been thrown into the dungeon for attempting to poison the food of the king and his family. Yusuf asks them about their dreams; one says that he saw himself pressing grapes into wine, and the other that he saw himself with a basket of bread on his head that birds are eating from. Yusuf says that the first servant will be released and return to the side of the king, but the second will be executed; both came to pass.

He asks the servant who will be released (Nabu, according to al-Ṭabari) to mention his case to the king. Asked about his time in prison, al-Ṭabari writes that Muhammad said: "If Yusuf had not said that – meaning what he said (to Nabu) – he would not have stayed in prison as long as he did because he sought deliverance from someone other than God."

The king is frightened by his dream that seven fat cows were eaten by seven thin ones and seven ears of corn were replaced with shriveled ears; none of his advisors could interpret it. When the servant who was released hears about it, he remembers Yusuf and persuades the king to send him to Yusuf for an interpretation. Yusuf tells the servant that Egypt will face seven years of prosperity followed by seven years of famine, and the king should prepare for it.

Scholars debate whether Yusuf agreed to interpret the dream immediately or if he said that his name should be cleared in the house of 'Aziz first. Al-Ṭabari writes that when the messenger came to Yusuf and invited him to come to the king, Yusuf replied: "Go back to your lord and ask him about the case of the women who cut their hands. My lord surely knows their guile." Ibn Kathir agrees with al-Ṭabari, saying that Yusuf sought "restitution for this in order that 'Aziz might know that he was not false to him during his absence" and Zulaikha eventually admitted that nothing happened between them. Al-Ṭabari inserts an interaction between Yusuf and the angel Gabriel in which Gabriel helps Yusuf gain his freedom and admit his desires.

Yusuf said, "What you cultivate during the next seven years, when the time of harvest comes, leave the grains in their spikes, except for what you eat. After that, seven years of drought will come, which will consume most of what you stored for them. After that, a year will come that brings relief for the people, and they will, once again, press juice". (Surah Yusuf Quran 12:47–49) When he learns about Yusuf's innocence, the king says: "Bring him to me that I may attach him to my person". He tells Yusuf, "Verily, this day, you are with us high in rank and fully trusted" (Surah Yusuf Quran 12:54) recognizing his virtues, ability, brilliance, good conduct and perfect mannerisms. Yusuf says, "Set me over the storehouses of the land; I will indeed guard them with full knowledge" (Surah Yusuf Quran 12:55).

==== Use of "king" and "pharaoh" ====
In the Quran, the ruler of Egypt during Yusuf's time is said to be the "king"; the ruler during the time of Moses is said to be "pharaoh", without a definite article. The title "pharaoh" began to be used to refer to rulers of Egypt with Thutmose III in 1479 BCE, about 20 years after Yusuf's death. In the biblical story of Yusuf, "king" (Hebrew: Melekh) and "pharaoh" are used interchangeably in Genesis 39 to 41.

=== Family reunion ===
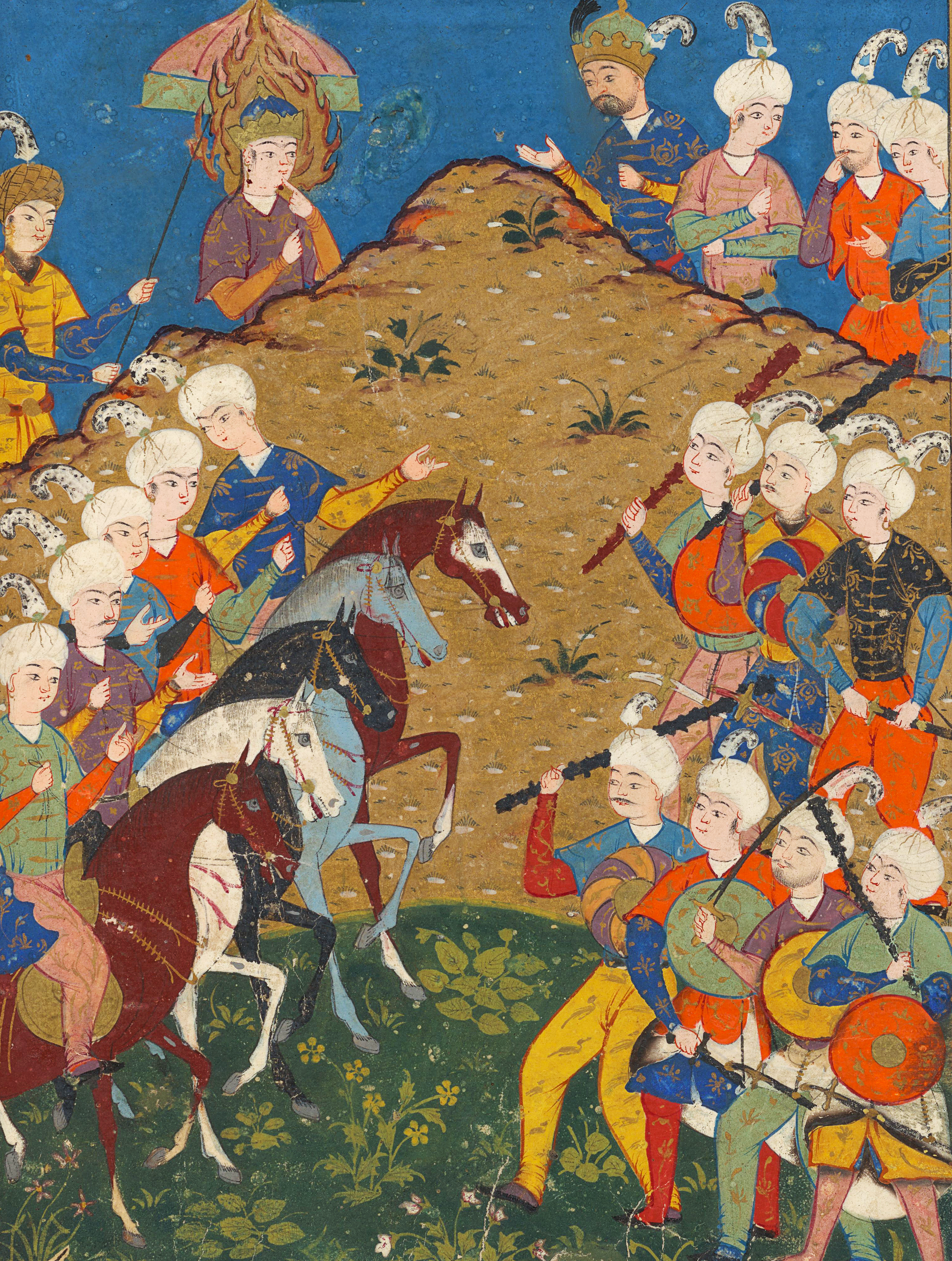
Islamic illustration of Yusuf defending Egypt's grain stores with 40,000 cavalrymen against the famine-struck armies of a king Rayyan of Hit

Yusuf became powerful; Ibn Kathir writes that the king of Egypt had faith in him, and the people loved and revered him. He was reportedly 30 years old when he was summoned to the king. "The king addressed him in 70 languages, and each time Yusuf answered him in that language". According to Ibn Is-haq(Issac), "The king of Egypt converted to Islam at the hands of Yusuf".

Yusuf's brothers suffer while the people of Egypt prosper under his guidance. Yaqub and his family are hungry, so the brothers go to Egypt, unaware that Yusuf is in a high position there. Yusuf gives them what they need, and questions them. They say that there were once twelve of them, and the one most loved by their father (Yusuf) died in the desert. Yusuf inquires about their youngest brother, Binyamin, and tells them to bring him with them the next time they come. The brothers, knowing their father's protectiveness of Binyamin, refuse, but Yusuf convinces them after he threatens to not provide them with grain unless their youngest brother is with them. To ensure their coming back, Yusuf stealthily returns their money to their saddlebags.

The brothers return home and attempt to persuade Yaqub to let Binyamin accompany them so they can secure food, but Yaqub responds: "Should I trust you with him as I once trusted you with his brother [Yusuf]?" (Surah Yusuf 12:64). The brothers then discover the money in their bags, and reveal it to Yaqub, promising Binyamin's safe return. Their father makes them swear by Allah to come back with him, and orders the brothers to use separate gates when returning to Egypt, for their safety and to avoid unnecessary suspicion.

When the brothers return with Binyamin, Yusuf reveals himself to him. He gives the brothers the promised supplies, and slips the king's cup into one of the bags. A herald accuses them of stealing, which the brothers deny. When asked what their punishment shall be if they are lying, the brothers agree it should be enslavement to the cup's owner, not realizing it was hidden in their bag. When Yusuf begins searching them, it is found with Binyamin's supplies.

To distance themselves from the perceived thief, they argue, "If he is a thief, then his (full) brother [Yusuf] was a thief before him". Yusuf hides his anger and thinks to himself, "You are in a worse position [than I]" (Surah Yusuf 12:77). After much angry discussion, the brothers try to have Binyamin released by offering themselves instead; however, Yusuf denies this and says that the one who committed the crime should be the one who atones. Reuben, feeling immense guilt for breaking his father's promise twice (with Yusuf and then again with Binyamin), swears he will not leave Egypt until his father allows him or God wills it. To prove they did not abandon Binyamin with malicious intent, they tell Yaqub of their brother's crime, and use the caravan they traveled with as witnesses.

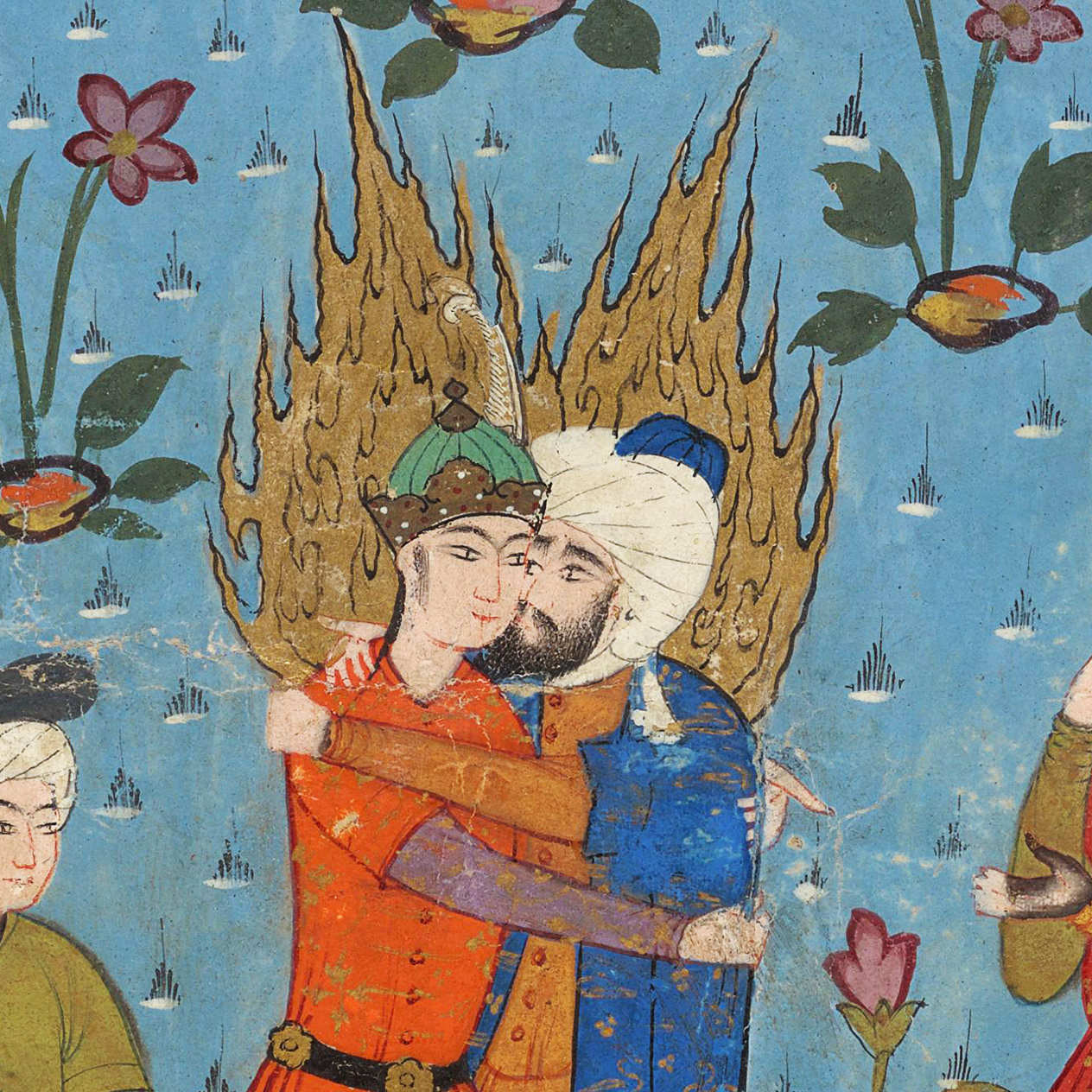
Upon his return Yusuf (left) is embraced and kissed by his father, Yaqub, who believed his son had died.

However, knowing they lied in the past, he does not believe them, accusing them of evil-doing, and goes blind from weeping for his missing sons. Forty years after Yusuf was taken from his father, Yaqub still misses him, in which the brothers exasperatedly remark, "By Allah! You will not cease to remember Yusuf until you lose your health or [even] your life!" (Surah Yusuf 12:85). Yaqub sends the brothers back to find out about Binyamin and Yusuf. Upon their return, they plead for supplies despite not having any money. Yusuf then asks, "Do you remember what you did to Yusuf and his brother when you were ignorant?" (Surah Yusuf 12:89). The brothers, realizing his true identity, admit their wrongdoing, and Yusuf forgives them. He then gives them one of his shirts to offer Yaqub.

As the brothers make their way back from Egypt, Yaqub tells his relatives, "Indeed I smell the fragrance of Yusuf. I say so although you may think that I am feeble-minded", to which his family members respond: "By Allah! You are still in your old delusion" (Surah Yusuf 12:94–95). However, Yaqub is proven right when the brothers come back, giving Yusuf's garment to him. He presses it to his face and his vision is restored. Then he tells his relatives, "Did I not tell you that I know from God what you do not know?" (Surah Yusuf 12:96). According to al-Ṭabari, this means that "from the truth of the interpretation of Yusuf's dream in which he saw eleven planets and the sun and the moon bowing down to him, he knew that which they did not know". The brothers ask Yaqub for forgiveness, to which their father promises to pray for them.

Yusuf's entire family arrives in Egypt, and he raises his parents to his throne beside him as a sign of affection and esteem. His childhood dream comes true when he sees his parents and eleven brothers prostrating themselves before him in love, welcome and respect. Ibn Kathir writes that his mother had died, but al-Ṭabari says that she was alive. Yusuf eventually dies in Egypt; when Moses leaves Egypt, he reportedly takes Yusuf's coffin so he will be buried with his ancestors in Canaan.

=== Death and burial ===
According to Islamic tradition, Yusuf is buried in Hebron next to the Cave of the Patriarchs, where a medieval structure known as the Castle of Yusuf (Arabic: قلعة يوسف, romanized: Qal'ah Yusuf) is located.

== Legacy ==
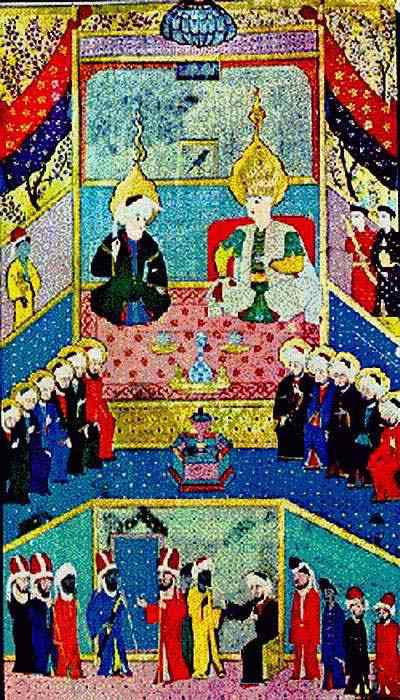
Miniature depicting Yusuf with his father Yaqub and brothers in Egypt from Zubdat-al Tawarikh in the Turkish and Islamic Arts Museum in Istanbul, dedicated to Sultan Murad III in 1583

Yusuf is revered in Islamic history. Descended from the patriarchs Abraham, Isaac and Yaqub, he also has the gift of prophecy. According to Kisai, one of the foremost biographers of the Quranic prophets, Yusuf was given a staff of light with five branches. On the first branch was written "Abraham, friend of God", on the second, "Isaac, pure of God", on the third, "Ishmael, sacrifice of God", on the fourth, "Yaqub, Israelite of God", and on the fifth, "Yusuf, Righteous of God".

The Quranic story of Yusuf may be one of the book's most detailed accounts of the life of a prophet. Yusuf symbolizes beauty, and is admired as a preacher of Islam who is strongly committed to God and tries to persuade people to follow the path of righteousness. The Quran recounts Yusuf's declaration of faith:

And I follow the ways of my fathers, – Abraham, Isaac, and Jacob; and never could we attribute any partners whatever to God: that (comes) of the grace of God to us and to mankind: yet most men are not grateful.

— Qur'an, Surah 12 (Yusuf) Ayah 38

Yusuf is described as having the three characteristics of the ideal statesman: pastoral ability (developed when he was young and in charge of his father's flocks); household management (from his time in Potiphar's house); and self-control, as seen on a number of occasions: "He was pious and God fearing, full of temperance, ready to forgive, and displayed goodness to all people."

=== Commentaries ===
Yusuf is largely absent from the hadith. Discussions, interpretations and retellings of his life may be found in tafsir, histories by al-Ṭabarī, Ibn Kat̲h̲īr and others, and in the poetry and pietistic literature of a number of religions. According to Ja'far al-Sadiq, a great-grandson of Muhammad and prominent source of hadith, Yusuf was righteous and moral.

Yusuf is a model of virtue and wisdom in spiritual literature, extolled in Ṣūfī works such as Abū Naṣr al-Sarrād̲j̲'s K. al-Lumaʿ as a paragon of forgiveness. "He also epitomizes the chastity that is based on complete trust in God, for it was his absolute piety that prompted God to personally intervene to prevent him from the transgression of succumbing to sexual temptation." Yusuf is an archetype of wisdom and faith, although still human (as in his interactions with his brothers in Egypt). His beauty is frequently noted, especially in post-Qurānic literature. According to Firestone in the Encyclopaedia of Islam, "His beauty was so exceptional that the behavior of the wife of al-ʿAzīz is forgiven, or at least mitigated, because of the unavoidably uncontrollable love and passion that his countenance would rouse in her. Such portrayals are found in many genres of Islamic literatures, but are most famous in Nūr al-Dīn ʿAbd al-Raḥmān Dijāmī's [q.v.] Yūsuf wa Zulayk̲h̲ā, which incorporates many of the motifs and attributes associated with his beauty in earlier works." From the seventh century AH (13th century CE) to the 10th (16th century CE), Yusuf was incorporated into Persian poetry and other literature, paintings and other forms of art.

==== Esoteric commentaries in Arabic ====
The story of Yusuf has esoteric Arabic commentaries which fill gaps in the narrative, make connections and identify characters. Additional details are common, and most complement information in canonical texts. According to Encyclopædia Iranica, much is derived from the Esra'Illiyat: traditions drawn from knowledge about Biblical events and people shared by Christians, Jews, and early Muslims. Sources of these traditions are Ibn 'Abbas (d. ca. 687) and Esma'il b. 'Abd-al-Rahman Soddi (d. 745). Al-Ṭabari includes the greatest number and variety of traditions supplying information not found in the Quran. "All the Arabic commentaries on Surat Yusuf include explanations and discussions of lexicography and grammar to clarify the literal meaning of the Qurʾānic story of Yusuf. They focus on smaller details, not big-picture meaning."

Additional themes include the nature of God. Mustansir Mir writes that Yusuf's story vindicates God's dominion and the fulfillment of his will. According to Mir's 1986 article in The Muslim World, this surah highlights the way dominion is established; God is al-Latif (Arabic: الـلَّـطـيـف, lit. 'the One subtle in accomplishing his will'), and is also al-'Alim (Arabic: الـعَـلـيـم, lit. 'the Knower or the All-Knowing One') and al-Hakim (Arabic: الـحَـكـيـم, lit. 'the Wise or the All-Wise One'). The Story of Yusuf in Arabic Verse is a poetic medieval version of the Quranic story.

==== Persian commentaries ====
Farsi tafsir vary in the extent to which they include explanatory discussions and Arabic quotations, and some Persian commentaries on Yusuf resemble their Arabic counterparts. Other commentaries consist mainly of a translation of the verses and storytelling, unlike al–Tabari's style. Mystical readings of Yusuf from the sixth century AH (12th century CE) tafsir of Maybundi are examples of this influence.

Storytelling becomes more prominent in Persian tafsir, which are known for their colorful, dramatic depiction of scenes in the narrative. Often described as "lively," it can be seen in Yusuf's interactions with his brothers. Another example of Persian expansion of the story is when the brothers realize that Yusuf is going to keep Binyamin in Egypt. One of the brothers, often Reuben, threatens Yusuf that he will yell so loudly that every pregnant woman would immediately give birth.

Judaeo-Persian literature also strongly influenced medieval Islamic writings. Scholars note that Judaeo-Persian literature seemed to have been developed during the Īl-K̲h̲ān dynasty in Persia, from the end of the seventh to the 13th centuries.

==== Sufi commentaries ====
Sufi tradition focuses on the lessons and deeper meanings "that may be elicited from the Qur'anic verses and the story of Yusuf provides them with ample scope to draw lessons of mystical, ethical, theological, and metaphysical significance." Commentaries in this tradition emphasize the themes of predestination and God's omnipotence. Two teachings stand out: "the first is that God is the controller and provider of all things and that human beings should have complete trust in Him and the second is the prevailing of the divine decree over human contrivance and design."

The theme of love transcends the story of Yusuf and Zulaikha. Yaqub becomes an archetypical mystic lover of God; Zulaikha evolves from a temptress to a lover, and from human to divine love. There are two kinds of love in the story: the passion of a lover and the devotion of a father to his lost son. Yusuf also represents eternal beauty as it is manifested in the created world. "The Persian versions include full narratives, but also episodic anecdotes and incidental references which occur in prose works, didactic and lyrical poetry and even in drama. The motif was suited to be used by Sufi writers and poets as one of the most important models of the relationship between the manifestation of Divine beauty in the world and the loving soul of the mystic."

There was also a Jewish presence. According to W. J. Fischer (2013), "Persian Jews, far from living in a cultural vacuum in isolation, took also a keen interest in the literary and poetical works of their Muslim neighbors and shared with them the admiration for the classical Persian poetry." Similar styles of meter and form translated easily between the two. The poet D̲j̲āmī is known for his reflections on stories such as Yusuf and Zulaikha, which were made accessible in Hebrew transliteration and are preserved.

==== Shia commentaries ====
In Muhammad ibn Ya'qub al-Kulayni's Kitab al-Kafi, when the fire was set for Abraham, Gabriel brought him a shirt from paradise and made him wear it. With the shirt on, cold or heat would not harm him. When Abraham was dying, he wrapped it up gave it to Isaac; Isaac gave it to Yaqub. When Yusuf was born, it was given to him. When he took it out in Egypt, Yaqub said, "I smell Yusuf's scent. I hope that you will not accuse me of senility (12:94)". It was the same shirt which was sent from paradise.

=== Medieval Muslim retellings of Sūrat Yūsuf ===
The story of Yusuf has been widely retold and influential in the Muslim world. The story has attracted extra elements which have become common in Islamic tradition. For example, the wolf whom Yusuf's brothers accuse of killing Yusuf miraculously speaks to Yaqub, revealing the true story. In the versions known as Yūsuf and Zulaikha, Yusuf eventually marries his one-time seductress, the wife of Potiphar.

The following retellings of Yusuf's story are based fairly closely on the Quranic Sūrat Yūsuf, unlike the more divergent Yūsuf and Zulaikha narratives, and are stand-alone texts, unlike the Qiṣaṣ al-anbiyāʾ, which recount Yusuf's life as part of a larger collection of prophets' biographies.

author (where known)	title	date (CE)	language	modern translation
Qul Ğəliy	Kyssa'i Yusuf	1233 (supposedly)	Old Tatar	English
Şeyyad Ḥamza	Destān-ı Yūsuf	thirteenth-century	Turkish	English
	Poema de Yuçuf	fourteenth-century	Aragonese	
	The Story of Yusuf in Arabic Verse	Middle Arabic	Arabic	English
al-Awsī	Zahr al-kumām fī qiṣṣat Yūsuf ʿalayhi al-salām	before 1350	Arabic	
	Story of Yusuf in Geneva, Bibliothèque de Genève, MS oriental 13	seventeenth-century	Arabic	French

=== Gender and sexuality ===
The story of Yusuf provides insight into Quranic models of sexuality and gender and an understanding of hegemonic masculinity. A prophet very different from other prophets in the Quran is encountered in the surah, but all prophets are chosen to guide other humans to God. Yusuf is similar to other prophets in that his story conveys God's message, and his story "begins and ends with God. For this reason all prophets are equal: their sole purpose is to highlight God's divinity but not their own significance over against other prophets."

Ibn Kathir uses Yusuf's resistance to Zulaikha as a basis for saying that men are saved by God because they fear him. Female scholars such as Barbara Freyer Stowasser consider this interpretation demeaning to women, suggesting that women do not have the same connection: "Both appear in the Hadith as symbolized in the concept of fitna (social anarchy, social chaos, temptation) which indicates that to be a female is to be sexually aggressive and, hence, dangerous to social stability. The Qurʾān, however, reminds human beings to remain focused on submission to God." In Islamic tradition, God does not disapprove of Yusuf and Zulaikha's mutual attraction and love; associated factors, however, make their love affair impossible.

== Scholarly comparison of the Quranic Yusuf story to the Biblical Joseph story ==
Many scholars have noted that while the older, Biblical account of the Joseph story is more novelistic and literarily complex, providing many details that were important to Israelites/Jews as part of their "national history", the Quranic version, whose audience did not see itself as related to the characters, serves more as "a moral", meant to "strengthen the hearts" of believers in times of hardship (such as the Meccan period during which it was revealed), and therefore modified and stripped of its wider national and cultural contexts.

== See also ==
- Biblical and Quranic narratives
- Holy Land (Arabic: الأَرض الـمُـبـاركـة, lit. 'The Blessed Land')
- List of legends in the Quran
- Prophet Yusuf (TV series)
- Prophets and messengers in Islam
- Qisas al-Anbiya
- Yusuf, chapter 12 of the Quran
