= L'histoire de Joseph d'après un manuscrit oriental =

1989 non-fiction book

- Author: Faïka Croisier
- Language: French
- Genre: Non-fiction
- Publisher: Labor et Fides
- Publication date: 1989
- Publication place: Switzerland
- Media type: Print
- ISBN: 9782830901351

L'histoire de Joseph d'après un manuscrit oriental (lit. 'The Story of Joseph, Based on an Eastern Manuscript'), by Faïka Croisier, Arabiyya, 10 (Geneva: Labor et Fides, 1989), is an analysis and translation of a previously unedited verse account of the Abrahamic prophet Joseph found in Geneva, Bibliothèque de Genève, MS oriental 13.

== The History of Joseph ==
The manuscript of the text studied in the volume was purchased in Egypt by the Arabist Jean-Joseph Marcel during an expedition there by Napoleon Bonaparte. The text seems to have been composed by one Aḥmad ibn ʿĪsā, undoubtedly a Muslim, in Egypt in 973 AH / 1565 CE, and the copying of the surviving manuscript completed by the same person on MS ramaḍān 1118 AH (though the manuscript reads "118") / 13 December 1706 CE. While fundamentally based on the Qur'anic Sūrat Yūsuf, the text can be said to be of the Yūsuf and Zulaykha type, in that it claims that while a slave in Egypt Yūsuf eventually marries his would-be seductor Zulaykha, the wife of his master.

== Summary of the book ==
In the first chapter, Croisier examines the manuscript and its author, the literary genre of the qiṣṣa, and the sources and development of the history of Joseph, charting the differences between several key versions of the Joseph story in a table (pp. 32–45). The second chapter examines the religious themes of the text under study, focusing of God's supremacy, Joseph as a prophet of God, repentance, and revelation. The third contemplates its literary content, including its hagiographical aspects, style of storytelling, grammatical and lexical details, and prosody. The fourth chapter is an annotated translation of the text (with no edition of the Arabic; pp. 103–238).
