= The Story of Joseph in Arabic Verse =

The Story of Joseph in Arabic Verse is the editorial title given to a poetic retelling of the story of Joseph the son of Jacob and Rachel based on the koranic account in sura 12 (Yusuf), the only instance in the Quran in which an entire chapter is devoted to a complete story of a prophet. The poem is in the ṭawīl metre and rhymes on -r. In its current fragmentary state, 469 lines (abyāt) survive. Its language suggests an origin in Egypt in the Middle Arabic period. The poem is one of a large number of medieval retellings of the Joseph story across the Abrahamic religions, among them the fourteenth-century Turkish morality play about Joseph by Sheyyad Hamza.

== Manuscript ==
Folio 10r, showing lines 138-145a of the poem.

One manuscript of the poem is known, though the editors noted evidence of similar content in Cairo, Dār al-Kutub, MS Arabic: ج 9205, and speculated that 'it may contain the text of a poem similar to ours'.

The manuscript is held the Brotherton Library of the University of Leeds as Department of Arabic, Islamic and Middle Eastern Studies MSS Collection, MS 347. In its present state, it comprises thirty-two, 15x10.5 cm folios, unbound. The text is extensively vocalised, with some rubrications, and laid out in single columns, fifteen lines per page. The folios are unbound and represent only part of the original MS. The editors speculate that it dates from the thirteenth or fourteenth century CE.

== Sample passage ==
In the following passage, lines 137–46, Jacob interrogates a wolf which Jacob's sons have captured and which they claim has eaten Joseph:

Jacob addressed him: 'O wolf, by Him Who

bestows death and life, and brings forth grain and dates,

Knowest thou anything of the Truthful One, or hast thou eaten him,

and caused grief to me over one whose face was brighter than the moon?'

Then the One Who knows what is hidden,

and knows each grain [of sand] hidden in the sandhill, caused him to speak:

'I am innocent of that of which you accuse me;

the truth has become clear and plain,

Because the flesh of all prophets

is forbidden to all wild beasts, to the Day of Resurrection.

I am a stranger, from a far country,

and I have had no rest from travelling for a year,

Searching for a dear brother I have lost;

I am seeking him in the deserts and the steppes,

Not knowing whether he is alive, hoping to find him still living

that we may be reunited after our long separation.

But if he is dead, I must put him from my mind, and return

with a sad heart, broken at our parting.

I had no acquaintanceship with this country, yet

as soon as I arrived they hunted me down.'

== Editions and translations ==
- The Story of Joseph in Arabic Verse in the Leeds Arabic Manuscript 347, ed. and trans. by R. Y. Ebied and M. J. L. Young, The Annual of Leeds University Oriental Society Supplement, 3 (Leiden: Brill, 1975), ISBN 9004041788 (with numerous emendations to the Arabic and corrections to the translation offered by A. F. L. Beeston, 'Notes on a Middle-Arabic "Joseph" Poem', Bulletin of the School of Oriental and African Studies, University of London, 40.2 (1977), 287–96).
