= Abu Hafs 'Umar ibn Ibrahim al-Ansari al-Awsi =

Andalusian Maliki muqriʾ

Abū Ḥafṣ ʿUmar bin Ibrāhīm al-Anṣārī al-Awsī
- Died: 1350/1351
- Known for: Zahr al-kumām fī qiṣṣat Yūsuf ʿalayhi al-salām

Abū Ḥafṣ ʿUmar bin Ibrāhīm al-Anṣārī al-Awsī (died 751 AH / 1350/1351 CE) was an Andalusian Maliki muqriʾ associated with Murcia, known for composing Zahr al-kumām fī qiṣṣat Yūsuf ʿalayhi al-salām (Arabic: زهر الكمام في قصة يوسف عليه السلام), a text about the Abrahamic prophet Yūsuf. He is mentioned, inter alia, in Kâtip Çelebi's seventeenth-century CE book catalogue Kashf al-ẓunūn and the twentieth-century biographical dictionary al-Aʿlām by Khayr al-Dīn al-Ziriklī.

== Zahr al-kumām fī qiṣṣat Yūsuf ʿalayhi al-salām ==
According to Wilhelm Ahlwardt, describing manuscript Pet. 291 of the work in the Königlichen Bibliothek zu Berlin, the author (here named merely as ʿUmar ibn Ibrāhīm al-Anṣārī al-Awsī) opens by explaining that the stories of the prophets are useful, and pleasing to God, and that the story of Joseph is particularly instructive, as its presence as sūrat Yūsuf in the Qur'ān indicates. Accordingly, al-Awsī edited the tale, dividing it into seventeen sections and making it more instructive by adding stories, verses, admonitions, reflections, and so forth. Each section begins with detailed praise of God and testimony to his Prophet and then deals with a passage from the Qur'ānic account of Joseph's life story.

According to Carl Brockelmann, the work was completed on 26 Jumāda I 683 AH/10 August 1284 CE. A short study of the work and its manuscripts was undertaken by Gholam Reza Jamshid Nejad Avval.

=== Editions ===
- al-Awsī, Zahr al-kamām (Cairo: Muṣṭafā al-Bābī al-Ḥalabī, 1950)
- Zahr al-kumām fī qiṣṣat Yūsuf ʿalayhi al-salām زهر الكمام في قصة يوسف عليه السلام (in Arabic). Beirut: Dar Al-Kotob Al-ilmiyah. 2003. ISBN 2-7451-3857-X.

=== Manuscripts ===
The following list of manuscripts is incomplete.

- Cambridge, Cambridge University Library, Qq. 281 (fifteenth-century)
- Cambridge, Cambridge University Library, Or. 1417 (fifteenth-century)
- Houmet Souk, Mhinni El Barouni Library (1652 CE, with online facsimile)
- Birmingham, Cadbury Research Library, Islamic Arabic 1142 (nineteenth-century)
- Erfurt, Forschungsbibliothek Gotha, Ms. orient. A 868 (with online facsimile)
- London, School of Oriental and African Studies Library, ms. 186487
- Oxford, Bodleian Library, MS. Marsh 110
- Jerusalem, National Library of Israel, with online facsimile
