= Job in Islam =

Prophet in Islam

Prophet ʾAyyūb Alayhi as-Salam
- أيوب; Job
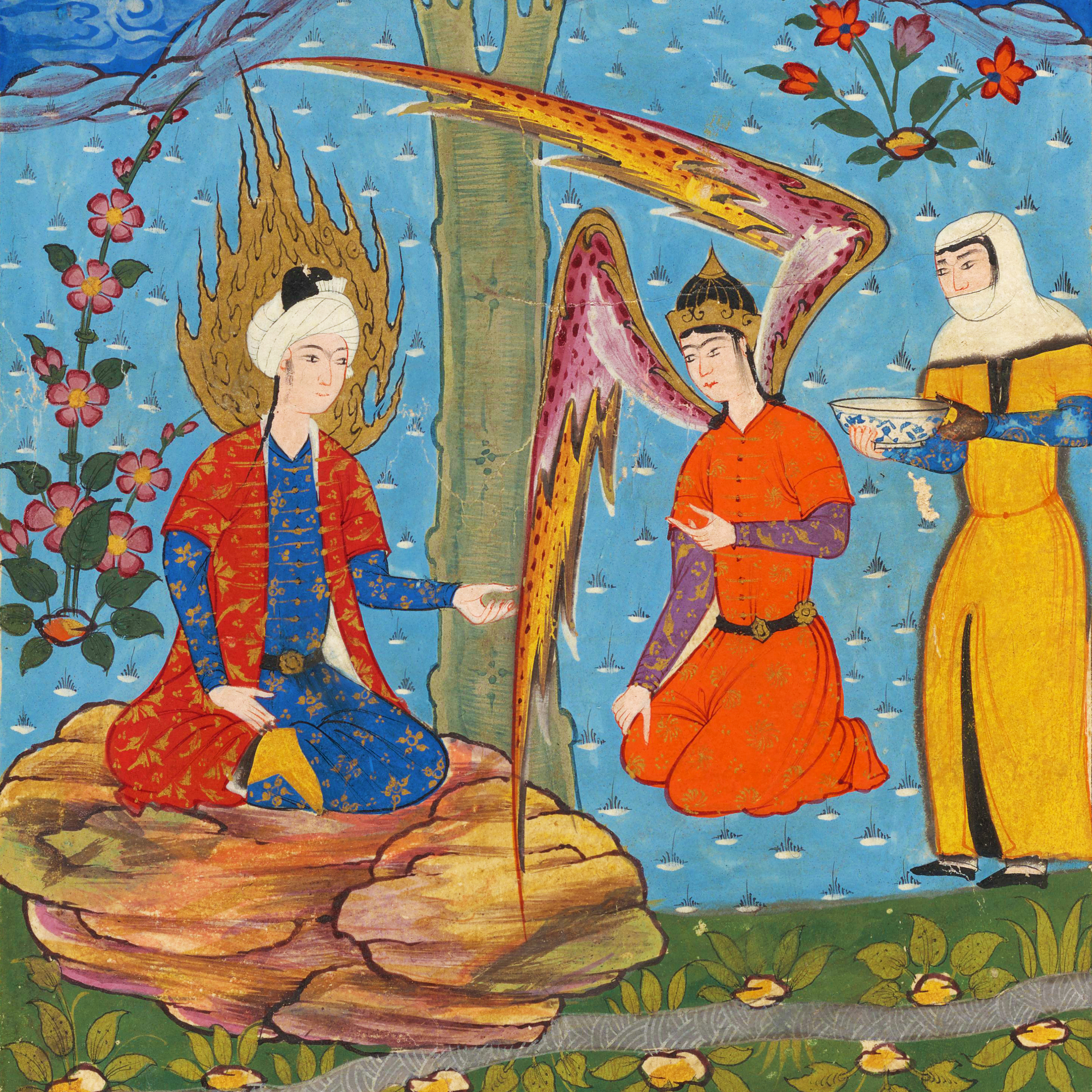
- Islamic miniature of Ayub (left) speaking with the angel Jibril who will lift his afflictions.

Prophet of Islam
- Preceded by: Yusuf
- Succeeded by: Shu'ayb

Personal life
- Buried: See #Associated places
- Known for: Enduring severe trials while remaining faithful to Allah

Religious life
- Religion: Islam

Job (Arabic: أيوب, romanized: ʾAyyūb) is a prophet in Islam mentioned in the Quran. Job's story in Islam is parallel to the Hebrew Bible's story, although the main emphasis is on Job remaining steadfast to God; there is no mention of Job's discussions with friends in the Qur'anic text, but later Muslim literature states that Job had brothers, who argued with the man about the cause of his affliction. Some Muslim commentators also spoke of Job as being the ancestor of the Romans. Islamic literature also comments on Job's time and place of prophetic ministry, saying that he came after Joseph in the prophetic series and that he preached to his own people rather than being sent to a specified community. Tradition further recounts that Job will be the leader in Heaven of the group of "those who patiently endured".

== In the Quran ==
ʾAyyūb (Job) is first mentioned in the Quran in the following verse:

Indeed, We have revealed to you, [O Muhammad], as We revealed to Noah and the prophets after him. And we revealed to Abraham, Ishmael, Isaac, Jacob, the Descendants, Jesus, Job, Jonah, Aaron, and Solomon, and to David We gave the book [of Zabur].

— Quran, surah 4 (An-Nisa), ayah 163

The Quran describes Job as a righteous servant of God, who was afflicted by suffering for a lengthy period of time. However, it clearly states that Job never lost faith in God and forever called to God in prayer, asking Him to remove his affliction:

And [mention] Job, when he called to his Lord, "Indeed, adversity has touched me, and you are the Most Merciful of the merciful."

— Quran, surah 21 (The Prophets), ayah 83

The narrative goes on to state that after many years of suffering, God ordered Job to "Strike with thy foot!". At once, Job struck the ground with his foot and God caused a cool spring of water to gush forth from the Earth, from which Job could replenish himself. The Quran states that it was then that God removed his pain and suffering and He returned Job's family to him, blessed him with many generations of children and granted him great wealth. In addition to the brief descriptions of Job's narrative, the Quran further mentions Job twice in the lists of those whom God had given special guidance, wisdom and inspiration (4:163) and as one of the men who received authority, the gift of prophethood (6:84).

After Satan had given up trying to turn Job away from the Lord, God removed Job's affliction and returned his family to him, doubling them in number. He returned Job's wealth and showered Job with gold. Once Job's wife had seen her husband restored to prosperity and health, she prayed thanks to God but then worried over the oath her husband had taken earlier, in which he had promised to strike her with a hundred lashes. Job was also deeply grieved over the oath he had taken, amidst his suffering. God, however, sent a revelation to Job, which told him to not beat his wife but to hit her once, using a bundle of a hundred blades of grass:

[We said], "And take in your hand a bunch [of grass] and strike with it and do not break your oath." Indeed, We found him patient, an excellent servant. Indeed, he was one repeatedly turning back [to Allah]."

— Quran, surah 38 (Sad), ayah 44

== Qur'anic commentary and Muslim tradition ==
Ibn Kathir narrates the story in the following manner. Job was a very rich person with much land, and many animals and children — all of which were lost and soon he was struck with skin disease as a test from God. He was afflicted with sores that crawled with worms. He remained steadfast and patient all along, so God eventually relieved him of the disease.

Job's lineage was an important field of study for many of the early Islamic scholars. A prevalent belief among early commentators was that Job descended from the line of Esau, the son of Ishaq. Although various commentators gave different genealogies relating to Job, all of them traced his ancestry to Abraham through Isaac's son Esau. Those scholars who traced Job's lineage back to Abraham did so by using the following Qur'anic verse as the basis for their view:

"That was the reasoning about Us which We gave to Abraham (to use) against his people. We raise whom We will in degree, for thy Lord is full of wisdom and knowledge. We bestowed upon him [Abraham] Isaac and Jacob, all (three) We guided; and before him We guided Noah and among his progeny David, Solomon, Job, Joseph, Moses, and Aaron. Thus do We reward those who do good."

Muslim historical literature fleshes out Job's story and describes him as being a late descendant of the patriarch Noah. Similar to the Hebrew Bible's narrative, Ibn Kathir mentions that Satan heard the angels of God speak of Job as being the most faithful man of his generation. Job, being a chosen prophet of God, would remain committed in daily prayer and would frequently call to God, thanking God for blessing him with abundant wealth and a large family. But Satan planned to turn the God-fearing Job away from God and wanted Job to fall into disbelief and corruption. Therefore, God allowed Satan to afflict Job with distress and intense illness and suffering, as God knew that Job would never turn away from his Lord. Although Job's possessions were destroyed and he suffered many calamities, he remained steadfast in his worship of God and remained committed to his religion. Satan then appeared to Job in the guise of an old man and suggested that God was not rewarding Job for his prayer. Job, however, rebuked Satan and told him that God is all-knowing and does what He thinks is best. It is said that then Satan, having failed at tempting Job, turned to Job's wife, who was also a faithful woman. Satan reminded Job's wife of her life before Job's affliction and how they were abundant in family and fortune. Job's wife, although she did not lose faith, burst into tears and asked Job to tell God to remove this suffering from the household. Job, in his misery, rebuked his wife and told her that this suffering had been for a relatively short period of time and, without thinking, swore that he would beat her with 100 strokes for complaining. After Job was cured, God ordered him to take some grass and to hit her once with 100 blades of grass. By doing this, Job fulfilled his promise to God but didn't hurt her. This Islamic narrative has now become symbolic and is often used by Islamic preachers as a reminder to be kind with wives.

Philip K. Hitti asserted that the subject was an Arab and the setting was Northern Arabia.

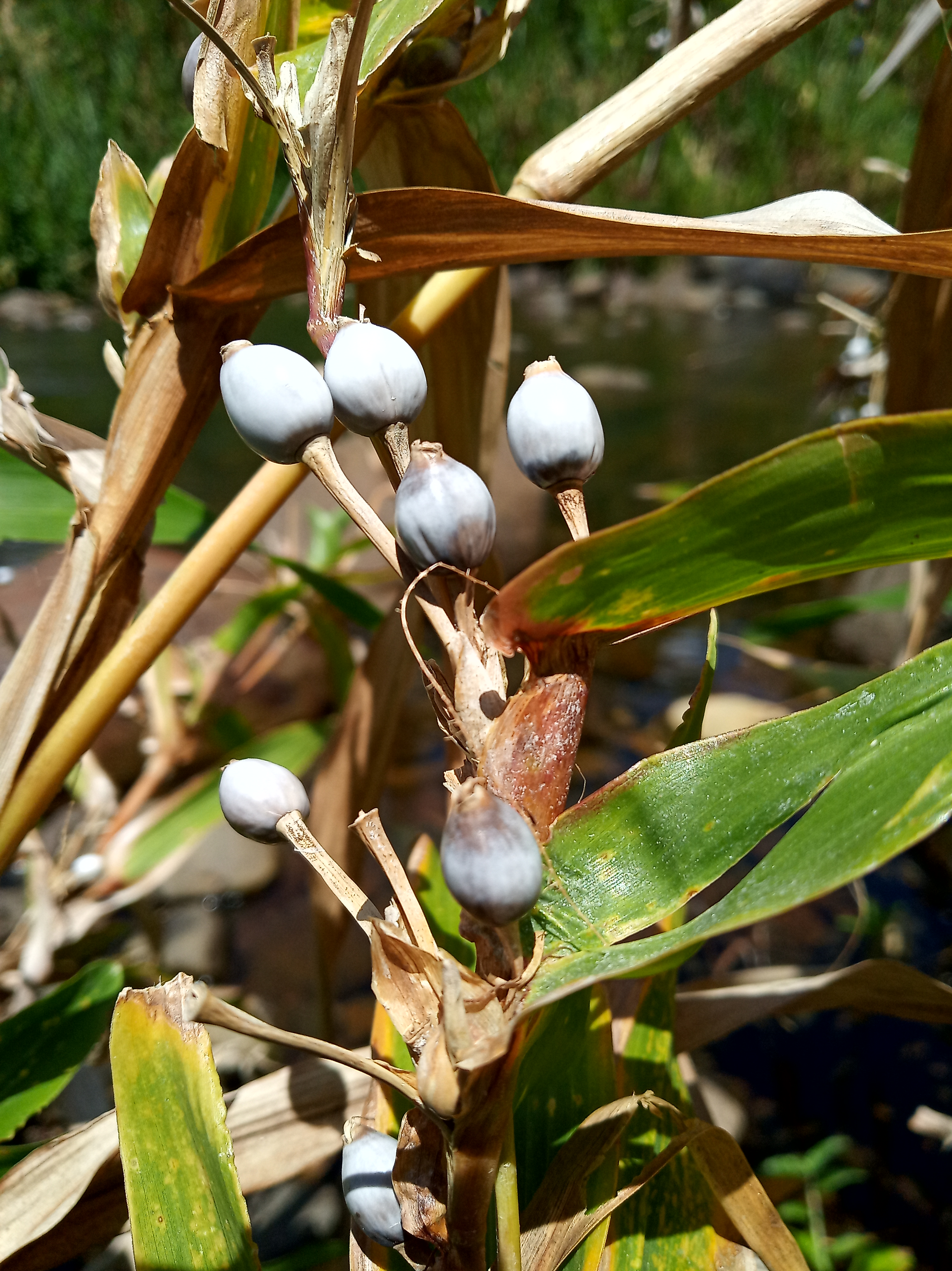
Pseudocarps of "Job's tears" plant.

The plant known in English as Job's tears (Coix lacryma-jobi) takes its name from Arabic دموع أيوب (dumūʿ ʾAyyūb), the name used by Arab merchants who introduced the plant to Europe in the Middle Ages. They used the pseudocarps for misbaha (prayer beads) and associated them with the account of the suffering of Job (Ayyub) in the Quran.

== Associated places ==
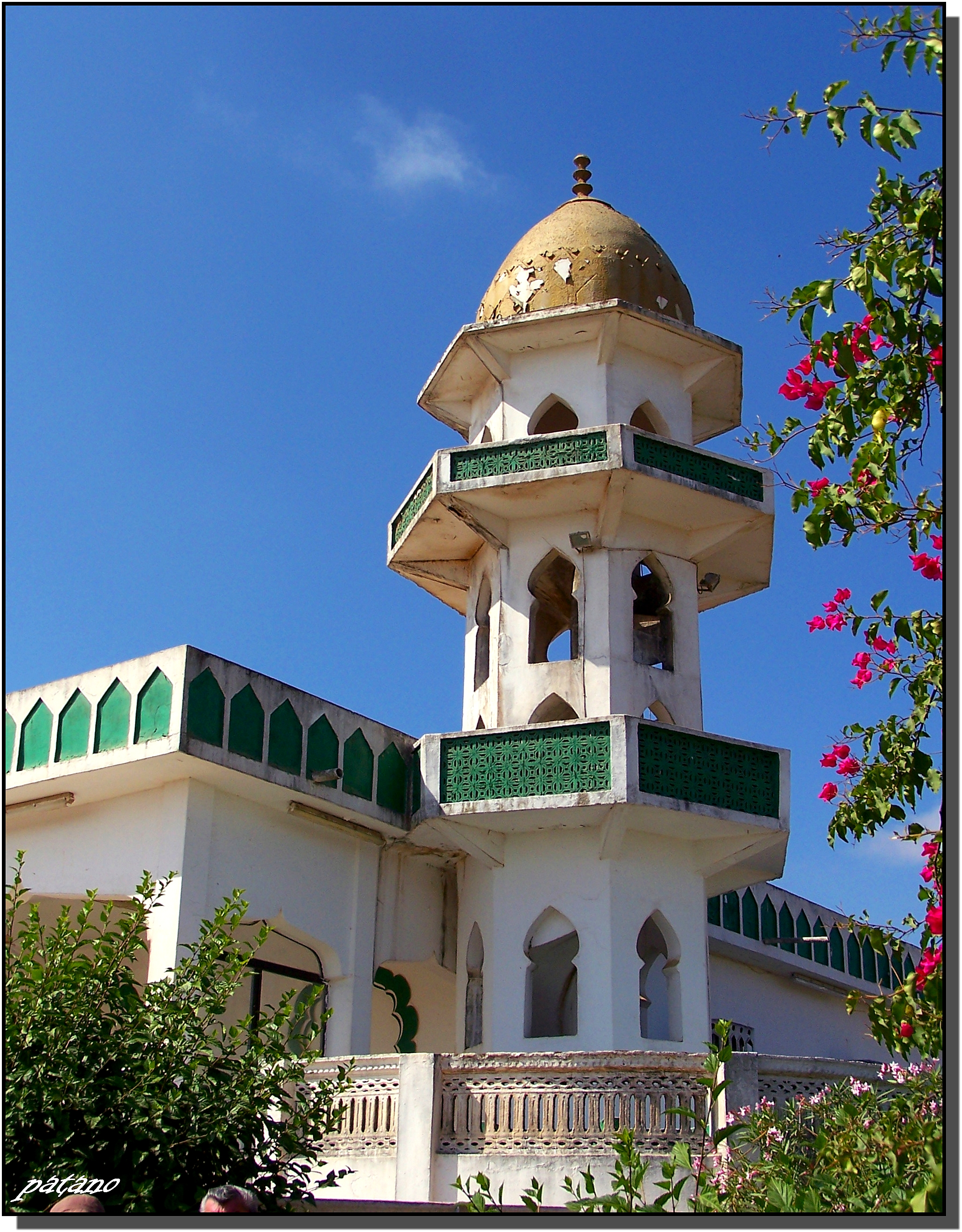
Ayyub's claimed shrine in Al-Qarah Mountains, southern Oman

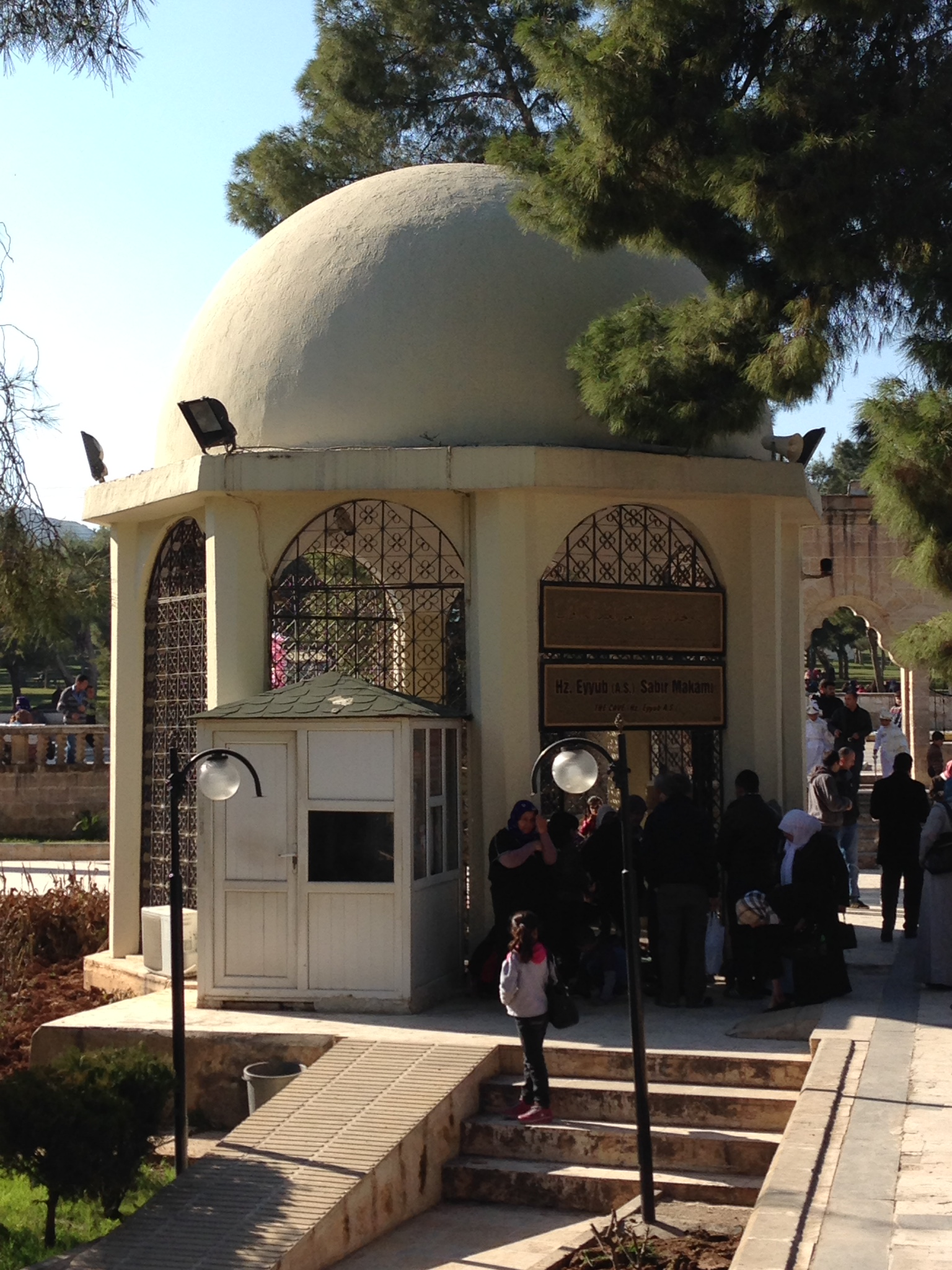
The entrance to the cave where Ayyub reportedly went through his ordeal with illness, at Urfa in southeast Turkey

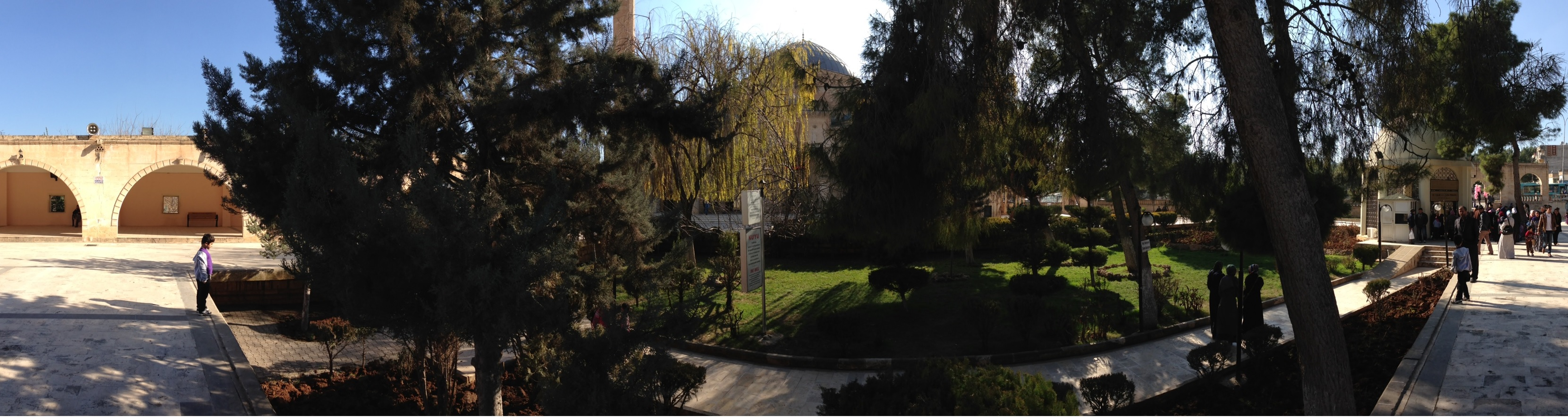
A panoramic view of the Prophet Eyyub Complex

== Bibliography ==
=== Qur'an references ===
- Job's prophecy: 4:163, 6:84
- Trial and patience: 21:83, 21:84, 38:41, 38:42, 38:43, 38:44

=== Further reading ===
- Ibn Kathir, Bidaya wa l-Nihaya, i, 220–225
- Tafsir on XXI and XXXVII
- Tabari, i, 361–364
- Thalabi, Tales of the Prophets, Cairo 1339, 106–114
- Kisa'i, Stories of the Prophets, 179–190
- Ibn Asakir, Tarikh al-Kabir, iii, 190–200
