= Jacob in Islam =

Islamic view of Jacob

Prophet Ya'qub Alayhi as-Salam
- يعقوب; Jacob
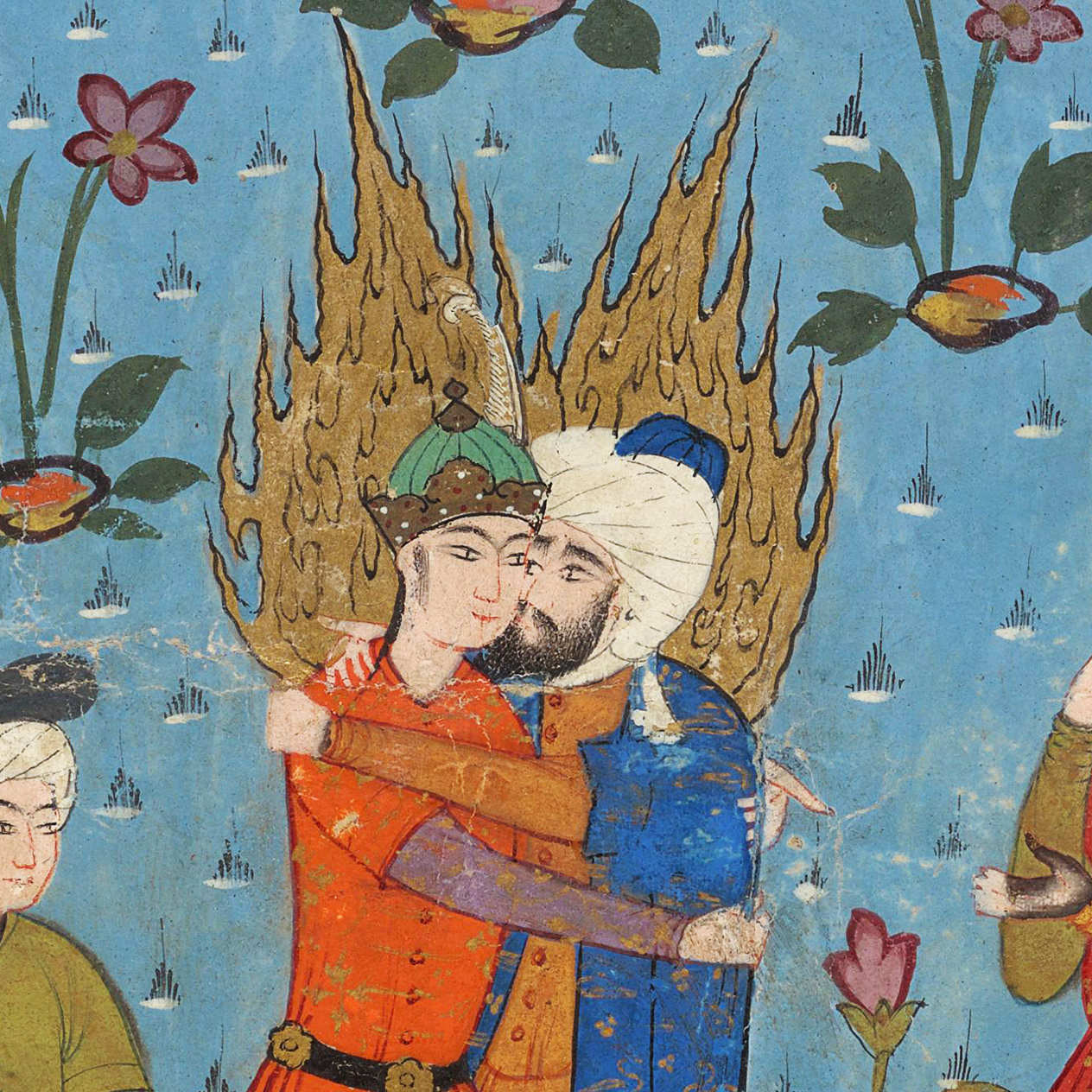
- Ya'qub (right) joyously embraces and kisses his son, Yusuf, whom he thought dead, upon the latter's return.

Prophet of Islam
- Preceded by: Ishaq
- Succeeded by: Yusuf

Personal life
- Resting place: Cave of the Patriarchs, Hebron
- Spouse: Leʼa; Rahil
- Children: 14, including Yusuf and Binyamin and his daughter Dinah
- Parents: Ishaq (father); Rafqa (mother)
- Other name: Isrāil
- Relatives: Ismail (uncle)

Religious life
- Religion: Islam

Ya'qub ibn Ishaq ibn Ibrahim ibn Tarakh (Arabic: يعقوب بن إسحاق بن إبراهيم بن تارخ [jaquːb ibn isħaːq ibn ibraːhiːm ibn tarːakh], transl. Jacob, son of Isaac, the son of Abraham), later given the name Isra'il (إِسْرَائِيل, transl. 'Israel'), is recognized by Muslims as an Islamic prophet. He is held to have preached the same monotheism as his forefathers: Abraham, Ishmael, and Isaac.

Jacob is mentioned sixteen times in the Quran. Two further references to "Israil" are believed to be mentions of Jacob. According to the Bible, Jacob was born in Canaan, the land where his father Isaac and grandfather Abraham had settled. Specifically, Genesis mentions that Isaac lived in Beersheba (Genesis 25:27), which is where his twin sons, Esau and Jacob, were born. At that time, the name "Israel" did not yet exist as a country. It was later, after his struggle with an angel, that Jacob was given the name Israel, and his descendants, the twelve tribes, would form the people of Israel and settle in the land of Canaan, which would later become the nation of Israel. In the majority of these references, Jacob, identified as a son of Isaac, is mentioned alongside fellow Hebrews as an ancient and pious prophet who stayed in the "company of the elect" and asserted the tawhid (The oneness of God) throughout his life. In Islam, as in Judaism and Christianity, it is stated that Jacob had twelve sons, who went on to father the Twelve Tribes of Israel. Jacob plays a significant role in the story of his son Joseph. The Quran further makes it clear that God made a covenant with Jacob, and that Jacob was made a faithful leader by divine command. His grandfather Abraham, his father Isaac, his uncle Ishmael, and his son Joseph are all recognized as Islamic prophets.

== In the Quran ==
Jacob is mentioned by name in the Quran sixteen times. Although many of these verses praise him rather than recount an instance from his narrative, the Quran nonetheless records several significant events from his life. In Islamic culture and literature, the earliest event involving Jacob in the Quran is that of the angels giving "glad tidings" to Abraham and Sarah of the future birth of a prophetic son by the name of Isaac as well as a prophetic grandson by the name of Jacob. The Quran states:

And when he had separated himself from them, and from the idols which they worshipped besides God, We gave him Isaac and Jacob; and We made each of them a prophet

— Quran 19:49

The Quran also mentions that Abraham taught the faith of pure monotheism to his sons, Ishmael and Isaac, as well as Jacob. The Quran records Abraham telling Ishmael, Isaac and Jacob: "Oh my sons! God hath chosen the Faith for you; then die not except in the Faith of Islam." The Quran also mentions the gifts given to Jacob as well as the strength of his faith, which became stronger as he became older. The Quran mentions that Jacob was "guided"; given "knowledge"; "inspired"; and was given a "tongue of truthfulness to be heard". The Quran later states the following regarding Jacob:

And We blessed him with Isaac ˹as a son˺ and Jacob ˹as a grandson˺, as an additional favour—making all of them righteous.
We ˹also˺ made them leaders, guiding by Our command, and inspired them to do good deeds, establish prayer, and pay alms-tax. And they were devoted to Our worship.

— Surah Al-Anbiya 21:72-73

And remember Our servants: Abraham, Isaac, and Jacob—the men of strength and insight.
We truly chose them for the honour of proclaiming the Hereafter.
And in Our sight they are truly among the chosen and the finest.

— Surah Sad 38:45-47

=== Jacob and his sons ===
Jacob's next significant mention in the Quran is in the narrative of the chapter (surah) Yusuf:

Q12.4 Joseph tells his father of his vision of eleven stars and the sun and the moon bowing down to him
5 Jacob warns Joseph against the jealousy of his brethren
6 Jacob understands the dream to signify Joseph's future prophetic character
7 Joseph's story is a sign of God's providence
8 Joseph's brethren are jealous of him and of Benjamin
9 They counsel together to kill or to expatriate him
10 One of them advises putting him into a well
11–12 They beg their father to send Joseph with them
13 Jacob hesitates through fear that Joseph may be devoured by a wolf
14–15 Joseph's brethren, receiving their father's consent, take him with them and put him in a well
15 God sends a revelation to Joseph in the well
16–17 The brethren bring to Jacob the report that Joseph had been devoured by a wolf
18 Jacob does not believe the story of his sons
19–20 Certain travelers find Joseph and carry him into bondage

63–66 Jacob reluctantly permits Benjamin to go to Egypt with his brethren

80–82 After consultation, Benjamin’s brethren all return to Jacob but one
83– Jacob refuses to credit their story, yet puts his trust in God
84–86 Jacob grieves for Joseph and yet tells of his hope
87 Jacob sends his sons to inquire after Joseph
88-90 Joseph makes himself known to his brethren
91–93 He pardons his brethren and sends his inner garment to his father to restore his sight
94–97 Jacob foretells the finding of Joseph and receives his sight
98–99 He asks pardon for his wicked sons
100 Joseph receives his parents unto him in Egypt
101 Jacob and his sons and wife all do obeisance to Joseph
102 Joseph praises God for his mercies and professes the Muslim faith

Joseph's story in the Quran opens with a dream that Joseph had one night, after which he ran to his father Jacob, saying: "Behold! Joseph said to his father: "O my father! I did see eleven planets and the sun and the moon: I saw them prostrate themselves to me!" " Jacob's face filled with delight at what he had heard from the young Joseph, and the ageing prophet immediately understood what the dream meant. Jacob could foresee that his son would grow up to be the next prophet in the line of Abraham and it would be Joseph who would keep the message of Islam alive in the coming years. Jacob's older sons, however, felt that their father loved Joseph and Benjamin, Jacob's youngest son, more than them. Jacob knew about their jealousy and warned the young Joseph about it. Joseph's ten older brothers then decided to kill him. As the Quran narrates their discussion:

˹Remember˺ when they said ˹to one another˺, “Surely Joseph and his brother ˹Benjamin˺ are more beloved to our father than we, even though we are a group of so many. Indeed, our father is clearly mistaken.
Kill Joseph or cast him out to some ˹distant˺ land so that our father’s attention will be only ours, then after that you may ˹repent and˺ become righteous people!”

— Surah Yusuf 12:8-9

One of the brothers (usually understood to be Reuben) however, felt that instead of slaying Joseph(Yusuf) they should instead drop him into a well, so that a caravan may come and pick him up. Thus, they asked their father whether they could take the young Joseph out to play with them, on the condition that they would keep watch over him. Although Jacob feared that a wolf would devour his son, the rebellious older sons forcefully took Joseph away and threw him into the well. When the sons came back to Jacob that night, they pretended to weep and they further told him that the wolf had devoured Joseph. To trick their father, they stained Joseph's(Yusuf) shirt with false blood, but Jacob, who had been gifted with knowledge, knew this was a false concoction that they had devised. Although Jacob did worry over the loss of Joseph, he remained steadfast to God throughout his grief.

As the years passed, the young Joseph grew up into a man in Egypt; Jacob, meanwhile, was back at home in Canaan, where his sons would constantly bother him about his repeated praying to God for the return of Joseph(Yusuf). Although Jacob frequently complained to God it was never for God's doings, but out of the distractions of his mind and his occasional breaking out of the bounds of patience he had set for himself. He constantly ignored the wicked taunting of his sons, forgave them, and tried to give them sound advice. One day, Jacob decided to send his sons on an errand, telling them to go to Egypt in search of Joseph and Benjamin. His sons, for the first time, listened to him and departed for Egypt. When one of Jacob's sons returned to Canaan with the good news of Joseph and Benjamin in Egypt, he came with a shirt that Joseph had given him, which he had told him to cast over their father's face, to remove Jacob's blindness and grief. Thus, the son followed the instructions and did as Joseph said, restoring Jacob's physical and mental vision.

Once Jacob's sight had been restored, the whole family began their trek to Egypt, to meet Joseph and the other sons again. Once they arrived, the father and son met each other with great love and were reunited in peace once again. The now powerful Joseph provided a home for his parents with himself and, as the Quran says, raised them high on a 'throne of dignity'. It was now that the whole family, together, could turn to God through the prophetic offices of both Jacob and Joseph.

==== Jacob's last advice to his people ====
The whole of the Children of Israel were called to bow down to faith in Islam (Submission to God) before Jacob died. Jacob wanted to make sure that his children die only in Islam, and, therefore, took one last promise from them. When he asked them who they would worship after his death, they replied that they would continue in Islam and bow down to and worship God. Although the death-bed scene relates to Jewish tradition, and mentioned in the Book of Genesis, the Quran mentions it to emphasize the notion that Abraham, Isaac, Ishmael, and Jacob were all Muslims, as they bowed down in full faith to God and God alone. The Quran narrates:

And Abraham enjoined the same upon his children, as did Jacob, “O my children, God has chosen for you the religion, so die not except in submission. .”
Or were you witnesses when death came to Jacob, when he said to his children, “What will you worship after I am gone?” They said, “We shall worship thy God and the God of thy fathers, Abraham, Ishmael, and Isaac: one God, and unto Him we submit.”

— Q2:132-133

== Prophetic legacy ==
Jacob is very special in Islam for carrying on the legacy left by his forefathers. Muslims believe God bestowed His utmost grace upon Jacob and chose him to be among the most exalted men. The Quran frequently mentions Jacob as a man of might and vision and stresses he was of the company of the good and elect. As the Quran says:

This was the argument We gave Abraham against his people. We elevate in rank whoever We please. Surely your Lord is All-Wise, All-Knowing.
And We blessed him with Isaac and Jacob. We guided them all as We previously guided Noah and those among his descendants: David, Solomon, Job, Joseph, Moses, and Aaron. This is how We reward the good-doers.

— Surah Al-An'am 6:83-84

Ali ibn Abi Talib, when asked about the prophets who were bestowed special names, narrates in Hadith that Ya'qub ibn Ishaq was known by his people as Isra'il.

Instances in the Bible involving Jacob wrestling with an angel are not mentioned in the Quran, but are discussed in Muslim commentaries, as is the vision of Jacob's Ladder. Jacob tricking Isaac into blessing him by impersonating his twin, Esau, is also not in the Quran, but is in Muslim commentaries.

Muslims, who do believe Jacob was a great patriarch, stress the belief that Jacob's main importance lay in his great submission to God and his firm faith in the right religion. As a patriarch, Jacob, alongside Abraham, may be the most fruitful according to tradition. From his twelve sons (Note: For the twelve sons, see Simeon, Issachar, Zebulun, Levi, Judah, Reuben, Dan, Asher, Naphtali, Gad, Joseph and Benjamin) were to come many other great prophets, including Jonah, (David), Solomon, and Jesus.

== Tomb in Hebron ==
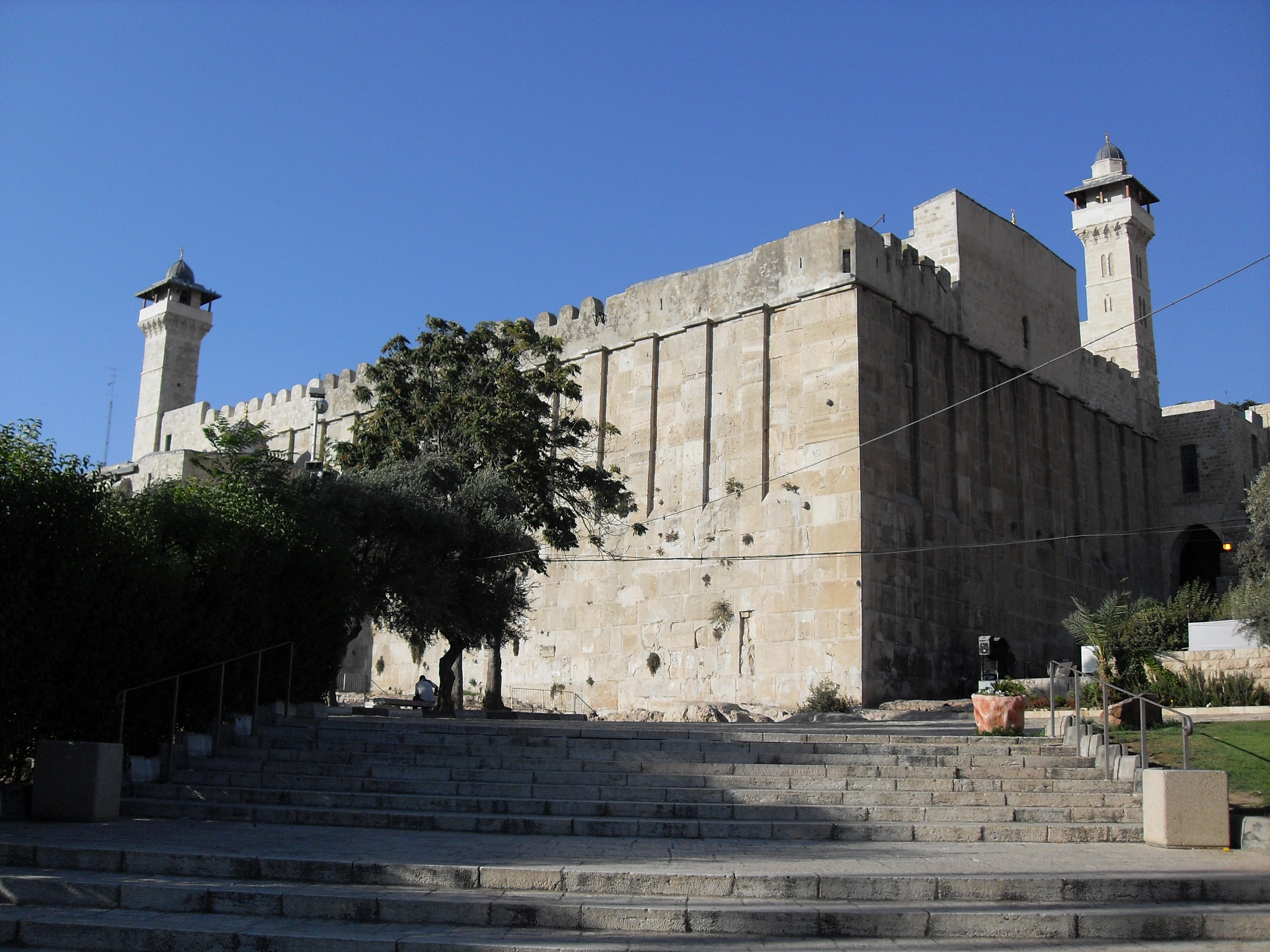
The Cave of the Patriarchs in Hebron, in Palestine, which is said to include the tomb of Jacob.

Jacob is believed by Muslims and Jews alike to be buried in the Cave of the Patriarchs (known by Muslims as the Sanctuary of Abraham). The compound, located in the city of Hebron, is the second holiest site for Jews (after the Temple Mount in Jerusalem), and is also venerated by Christians and Muslims, both of whom have traditions that maintain that the site is the burial place of three Biblical couples: Abraham and Sarah, Isaac and Rebecca, and Jacob and Leah.

== Quranic references to Jacob ==
- Appraisals for Jacob: Quran 6:84, 19:50, 21:72-73, 38:45-47
- Jacob's prophecy: Quran 4:163, 6:84, 12:6, 19:49, 21:73
- Jacob's preaching Quran 2:132-133, 2:136, 2:140, 3:84, 21:73
- Food refusal: Quran 3:93
- Love for Joseph: Quran 12:8, 12:13, 12:84-85, 12:94-95
- Jacob's attributes: Quran 12:86, 12:96, 38:44
- Jacob's family: Quran 2:136, 2:149, 3:84, 4:163, 7:160

== See also ==
- Biblical and Quranic narratives
- Qisas al-Anbiya (Stories of The Prophets)
- Yakub (Nation of Islam)
