= Şeyyad Ḥamza =

Turkish poet

Şeyyad Ḥamza (thirteenth-century CE) was mystical poet of Turkish ethnicity, particularly noted for his playwriting.

== Life and works ==
The evidence for Şeyyad's life comes from sixteenth-century CE biographical scholarship, but this reveals little certain about his life. He seems to have lived most of his life around Akşehir and Sivrihisar. He supposedly had a daughter, Aṣlī Khātūn, whose tombstone was believed to be found in Akşehir.

The first modern scholar to study Şeyyad was Mehmed Fuad Köprülü, who published fifteen lines of a methnewī by Şeyyad which he had found in Jāmiʿ al-neẓāʾir by Egerdirli Ḥājjr Kemāl. Mehmed saw Şeyyad as typical of bāṭiniyya thought during the period of the Mongol invasions of Anatolia. Thereafter, scholarship identified a number of works by Şeyyad, and suggested 'his importance as a predecessor of Yūnus Emre [...] and his place in the early experimental period of Ottoman literature'. Some were in the tradition identified by Kathleen Burrill as 'folk poems'; some of these 'contain coarse elements and reflect the turmoil of 7th/13th-century Anatolia. In general, however, they express with simple lyricism his moral and religious views'. Şeyyad also composed literary poetry, including religious pieces contemplating death and avoiding worldly entrapments, work in the naʿt genre, amatory verse, and a naẓīre responding to one of Rūmī's ghazals.

=== Destān-ı Yūsuf ===
Probably Şeyyad's best known work is a 1529-line morality play Destān-ı Yūsuf ('Tale of Joseph'), an adaptation of the Qur'ān's Sūrat Yūsuf, about Joseph son of Jacob, which introduces mystic elements into a traditional Islamic telling of Joseph's life. According to Burrill, 'the format, while adhering in general to the Persian mathnawī tradition, replaces interspersed ghazels with five nükte or moral commentaries. The poem's general tone is strongly reminiscent of folk narrative. The Turkish (largely free of Arab- or Persianisms) requires frequent prosodic licence to achieve the chosen (remel) metre, and the rhyme structure lacks polish'.

=== Hādhā dāsitān-i̊ Sulṭān Mahmūd ===
Şeyyad also composed the 76-line methnewī called Hādhā dāsitān-i̊ Sulṭān Mahmūd ('This is the tale of Sultan Maḥmūd'), referring to Mahmud of Ghazni. In the poem, Maḥmūd meets a poor dervish, and the two debate how best to win a place in Paradise. This topic was a traditional one in Persian poetry.

== Editions and translations ==
- Sheyyad Hamza, The Story of Joseph: A Fourteenth-Century Turkish Morality Play, trans. by Bill Hickman (Syracuse, New York: Syracuse University Press, 2014) ISBN 9780815633570.
- Şeyyad Hamza, Yusuf ve Zeliha, ed. by Dehri Dilçin (Istanbul 1945).
