= Yusuf (surah) =

12th chapter of the Qur'an

Surah 12 of the Quran
يُوسُف Yusuf Joseph
- Qira'ah; English text
- Classification: Meccan
- Position: Juzʼ 12 to 13
- No. of verses: 111
- No. of Rukus: 12
- No. of words: 1795
- No. of letters: 7307

Yusuf (Arabic: يوسف, romanized: Yūsuf, lit. 'Joseph') is the 12th chapter (Surah) of the Quran and has 111 Ayahs (verses). It is preceded by sūrah Hud and followed by Ar-Ra’d (the Thunder).

Regarding the timing and contextual background of the believed revelation (asbāb al-nuzūl), it was revealed toward the end of the Meccan period, which means it is believed to have been revealed in Mecca, rather than later in Medina. It is said to have been revealed in a single sitting and is unique in this respect. The text narrates the story of Yusuf (Joseph), son of Jacob, who is a prophet in Islam, and recounts his life and mission.

Unlike the accounts of other Islamic prophets, different elements and aspects of which are related in different surahs, the life-history of Yusuf is narrated in this surah only, in full and chronological order. This surah, according to Muslims, presents many principles of how to serve Islam by relating the life-history of a prophet who became the most renowned and respected figure in the country to which he had been sold as a slave; and also touches on the truth contained in dreams.

The surah was first translated into Latin by Thomas van Erpe in 1617 and later in the 17th century published synoptically in Arabic and Latin as part of the Lutheran efforts at translating the Quran.

== Summary ==
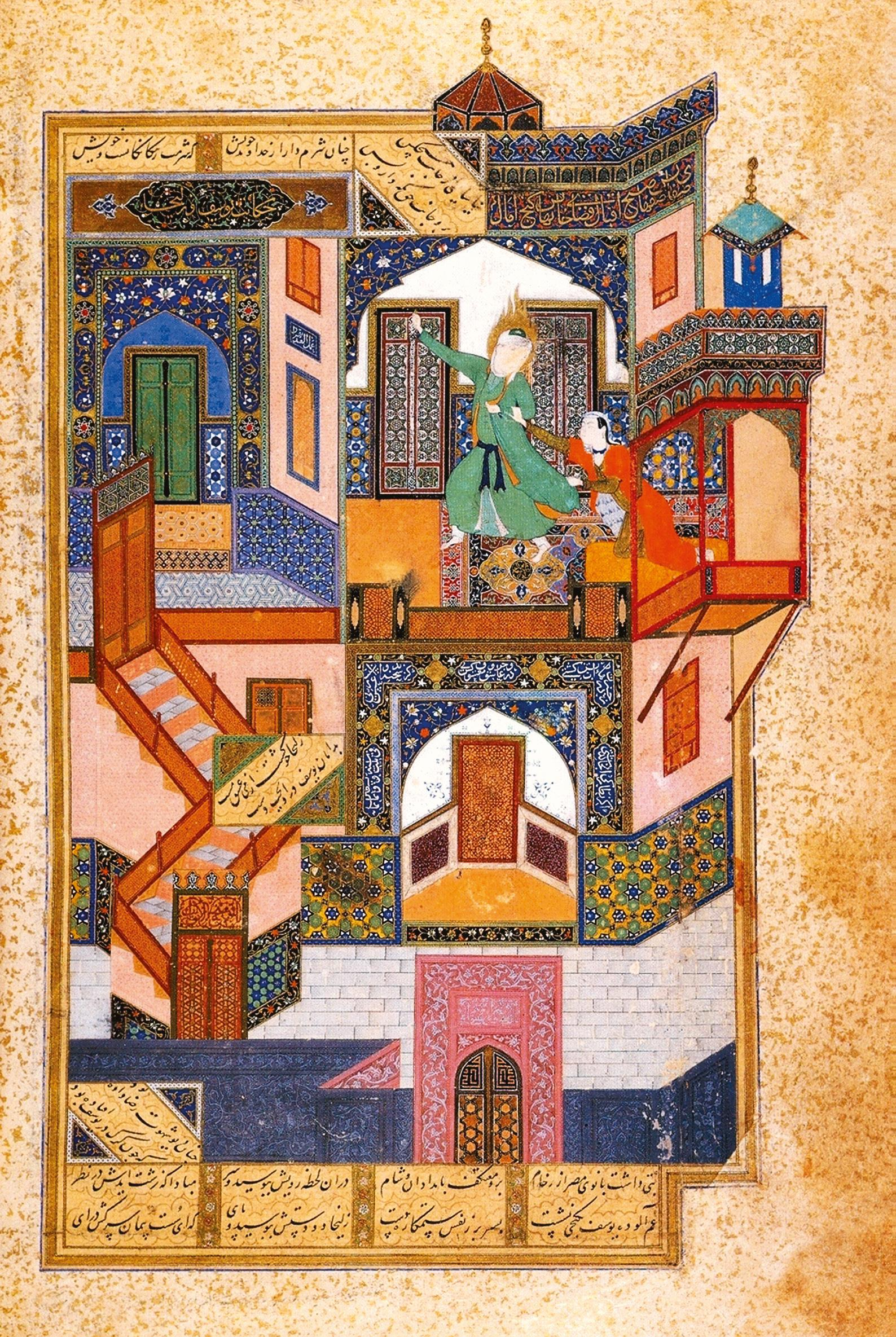
Yusuf and Zulaikha (Joseph chased by Potiphar's wife), Persian miniature by Behzād, 1488.

1–3 Muhammad is acquainted by inspiration with the history of Joseph
4 Joseph tells his father of his vision of eleven stars and the sun and the moon bowing down to him
5 Jacob warns Joseph against the jealousy of his brethren
6 Jacob understands the dream to signify Joseph's future prophetic character
7 Joseph's story is a sign of God's providence
8 Joseph's brethren are jealous of him and of Benjamin
9 They counsel together to kill or to expatriate him
10 One of them advises putting him into a well
11–12 They beg their father to send Joseph with them
13 Jacob hesitates through fear that Joseph may be devoured by a wolf
14–15 Joseph's brethren, receiving their father's consent, take him with them and put him in a well
15 God sends a revelation to Joseph in the well
16–17 The brethren bring to Jacob the report that Joseph had been devoured by a wolf
18 Jacob does not believe the story of his sons
19–20 Certain travelers find Joseph and carry him into bondage
21 An Egyptian purchases Joseph and proposes to adopt him
22 God bestows on him wisdom and knowledge
23 The Egyptian’s wife endeavors to seduce Joseph
24 By God’s grace he was preserved from her enticements
25 She accuses Joseph of an attempt to dishonor her
26–27 The rent in his garment testifies to Joseph's innocence
28–29 Azeez believes Joseph and condemns his wife
30 The sin of Azeez’s wife becomes known in the city
31 The wives of other noblemen, seeing Joseph’s beauty, call him an angel
32 Azeez’s wife declares her purpose to imprison Joseph unless he yields to her solicitations
33 Joseph seeks protection from God
34 God hears his prayer and turns aside their snares
35 Joseph imprisoned notwithstanding his innocence
36–37 He undertakes to interpret the dreams of two of the king’s servants who were also imprisoned with him
38–40 Joseph preaches the Divine unity to his fellow-prisoners
41 He interprets the dreams of the two servants
42 Joseph asks to be remembered by the king but is forgotten
43 The dreams of the king of Egypt
44 The king's interpreters fail to interpret the king’s dream
45–49 Joseph remembers and interprets the king’s dream
50 The king calls Joseph out of prison
51 The women of the palace acknowledge their sin in endeavoring to entice Joseph to unlawful love
52–53 Joseph vindicated. The wife of Azeez does not acquit herself of blame.
54 The king restores Joseph
55–57 Joseph made king’s treasurer at his own request
58 His brethren come to him but do not recognize him
59–61 Joseph requires his brethren to bring to him their brother Benjamin
62 Their money returned in their sacks to induce their return
63–66 Jacob reluctantly permits Benjamin to go to Egypt with his brethren
67 Jacob counsels their entering the city by several gates
68 This counsel is of no avail against God’s decree
69 Joseph, receiving Benjamin, makes himself known to him
70–76 He, by guile, brings his brethren under the charge of theft
77, 79 He insists on retaining Benjamin instead of a substitute
80–82 After consultation, Benjamin’s brethren all return to Jacob but one
83 Jacob refuses to believe their story, and puts his trust in God
84–86 Jacob grieves for Joseph and yet tells of his hope
87 Jacob sends his sons to inquire after Joseph
88–90 Joseph makes himself known to his brethren
91–93 He pardons his brethren and sends his inner garment to his father to restore his sight
94–97 Jacob foretells the finding of Joseph and receives his sight
98–99 He asks pardon for his wicked sons
100 Joseph receives his parents unto him in Egypt
101 Jacob and his sons and wife all do obeisance to Joseph
102 Joseph praises God for his mercies and professes the Muslim faith
103–107 The infidels will not believe the signs of the Qurán
108 God's order to the messenger to proclaim the Muslim faith
109 God’s prophets in all ages have been but men
109–110 Unbelievers are invariably punished for rejecting the messengers of God
111 The Quran is no forgery, but a confirmation of the writings of former prophets

== Narrative ==
The story of Prophet Yūsuf. Yūsuf is one of the sons of Ya'qub who has the talent of interpreting dreams. One day Yūsuf has a dream and he narrates his dream to his father, who immediately knows that Yūsuf will be a prophet. His father tells him not to tell his brothers to avoid any harm. However, because of Ya'qub's loving treatment towards Yūsuf, Yūsuf's brothers felt jealous. They wanted to get rid of Yūsuf, so their father could love them instead of Yūsuf. Their initial plan was to kill Yūsuf, but later they decided to throw him in a well. They lied to their father and told him that a wolf had killed him. Later, a caravan rescued Yūsuf from the well, who then sold him to a 'Al-Aziz in Egypt. The 'Al-Aziz took Yūsuf in and was hoping to either put him to work or adopt him as a son. Later, the man's wife tries to seduce Yūsuf, but he resists. The woman seeing his resistance accuses Yūsuf of wanting to harm her and demands that he should either be punished severely or sent to jail.

A witness, after Yūsuf defends his innocence, testifies "if his shirt is torn from the front, then she has told the truth, and he is of the liars, but if his shirt is torn from the back, then she has lied, and he is of the truthful." The shirt was indeed torn from the back. Soon after this accident, the women of the city talk of how the wife is seeking to seduce Yūsuf. The wife of 'Al-Aziz invites them to a banquet, gives each of them a knife, and then tells Yūsuf to come out. The women cut their hands in astonishment. 'She said, "That is the one about whom you blamed me. And I certainly sought to seduce him, but he firmly refused; and if he will not do what I order him, he will surely be imprisoned and will be of those debased." Yūsuf prefers prison to succumbing to the seduction, and prays to God. He is then indeed sent to prison.

In the prison, Yūsuf meets two other men and interprets one of the prisoner's dreams. The prisoner is then released, and Yūsuf asks him to mention his talent to the king. One day, the King has a dream and the prisoner who had been released mentions Yūsuf. He interprets the King's dream, which is about Egypt having a seven-year drought. To reward him, the King orders his release from jail and the King also investigates his case. The wife who tried to seduce Yūsuf testifies that he is innocent, and the truth is revealed. Yūsuf is given authority in Egypt.

During the seven-year drought, Yūsuf's brothers visit Egypt to get food for their family. Upon seeing his brothers, Yūsuf recognizes them, but they do not recognize him. Yūsuf, in a high position of authority, requests that the next time they come, they bring their youngest brother Benjamin with them. When the brothers return with their youngest brother, Yūsuf takes him aside and tells him his identity. Yūsuf plants an object in his youngest brother's belongings then accuses him of theft and detains him, in order to keep him near. Later, when the father and brothers face poverty, they come back to Yūsuf and Yūsuf then helps them and reveals his identity, asking them to come and live with him.

== Revelation ==
There is no confirmed time when Surah Yūsuf was supposedly revealed, but it is estimated to be either in the 10th or 11th year of dawah. In other words, it is known to have been revealed 2 or 3 years before the hijrah (Migration) from Mecca to Madina, which is close to the end of the Meccan period. This Sura was revealed after a year the scholars of Sira call 'am al huzun' (the year of Sorrow or Despair). This year was a difficult and depressing time for the Islamic prophet Muhammad. He was going through several hardships, out of which three are considered the most significant. The first one was his uncle Abu Talib's death. Abu Talib was the only father figure he had left and one of the people who protected him from the harms of society. The second tragedy was the death of his beloved first wife, Khadija. She was the first to believe in his message, and she was his comfort. The two deaths were a significant loss to him, as they were the people in his life that motivated and protected him through his journey. Later on, in Mecca, after his uncle's death, the pagans made him face excessive hardships while he tried to call the people to Islam. Expecting a better response from the city of Ta'if, Muhammad departed Mecca. However, to his disappointment, the people of Ta'if did not welcome him, instead giving him a hard time and chasing him out of the city, throwing rocks at him. He was injured, bleeding and left with nothing but disappointment from the people of Ta'if. This sura was meant to uplift his spirits and comfort him in his time of rejection.

=== Other findings ===
Along with the three crucial events that marked the revelation for Muhammad, religious scholars have mentioned other incidents that led to the revelation of the sura. The Quraysh wanted to test Muhammad, as they were in disbelief of his knowledge and spiritual capabilities. They did not believe him to be a prophet and planned to trick him by asking a question that only a true prophet would be able to answer. The story of Yūsuf and his brothers, according to some religious scholars, was one that was known among Christians and Jews, but not heard of by the Quraysh. To recite this story would show true revelation, and so it was seen as proof of Muhammad's prophecy. Following the hardships faced within the city of Mecca, the story of Yūsuf is said to have been revealed to uplift people's spirits. His followers asked, "O Messenger of Allah, why don't you tell us the stories of those before us who also suffered?"

== Hadith culture ==
It has been narrated by Ja'far al-Sadiq, a great-grandson of Muhammad, that the individual who recites Surah Yūsuf during every day or every night will be resurrected on the Day of Judgement with beauty resembling the beauty of Yūsuf. He will not fear the Day of Judgement and will be among the best of the believers.

Muhammad is reported to have encouraged the teaching of Surah Yūsuf to slaves, claiming that "whenever a Muslim recites it and teaches it to his family and slaves, Allah would ease for him the pangs of death and make it so that no Muslim would envy him".

== Major themes ==
=== The faith of the prophets ===
The faiths of the prophets before Muhammad were the same as his. The prophets Ibrahim, Ishaaq, Ya'qūb and Yūsuf invited the people to the same message as Muhammad.

=== Character of a Muslim ===
- Has awareness of Allah and accountability of one's deeds
- Pursues one's goals while remaining under the limits prescribed by the Divine Law
- Believes that success and failure are entirely in the hands of God, that whatever Allah wills will happen and no one can prevent it
- Applies one's efforts towards the truth and places trust in Allah

=== Confidence and courage ===
Throughout the story of Yūsuf, Allah taught the believers that a person who possesses true Islamic character can master the world with the strength of their character. The example of Yūsuf shows that a person of high and pure character can overcome severe circumstances and be successful.

=== Objectives of this Surah ===
1. To provide proof that Muhammad's prophethood is real, and that his knowledge was gained through revelation.
2. It applies the theme of the story to the people of Quraysh (The tribe of the leaders in Mecca) and warns that the conflict between them and Muhammad would end in his victory over them. As stated in verse 7: "Indeed there are signs in this story of Yūsuf and his brothers for the inquirers"

== Scholarly comparison of the Quranic Yusuf story to the Biblical Joseph story ==
Many scholars have noted that while the older, Biblical account of the Joseph story is more novelistic and literarily complex, providing many details that were important to Israelites/Jews as part of their "national history", the Quranic version, whose audience did not see itself as related to the characters, serves more as "a moral", meant to "strengthen the hearts" of believers in times of hardship (such as the Meccan period during which it was revealed), and therefore modified and stripped of its wider national and cultural contexts.
