= Abdon (biblical figures) =

Abdon (Hebrew: עַבְדּוֹן, lit. 'servile', from לַעֲבוֹד, la'avōd, 'to serve') is the name of four biblical individuals. It is a diminutive form of the name Ebed (עֶבֶד, 'slave').

1. An Abdon in the book of Judges.
2. The first-born of Gibeon of the tribe of Benjamin, mentioned only in passing in genealogies (1 Chronicles 8:30 and 9:36).
3. Abdon, son of Micah. King Josiah sent him, among others, to the prophetess Huldah to discern the meaning of the recently rediscovered book of the law (2 Chronicles 34:20). He is referred to as Achbor (עַכְבּוֹר, ʿAḵbōr, 'mouse') in 2 Kings 22:12 as the son of Michaiah.
4. Abdon, son of Shashak—mentioned in a genealogy (1 Chronicles 8:23).

In addition to its use as a personal name, the proper name "Abdon" is used for a Levitical city mentioned in Joshua 21:30 and 1 Chronicles 6:59.
