= Serah =

Biblical figure

Serach bat Asher (Biblical Hebrew: שֶׂרַח) was, in the Torah, a daughter of Asher, the son of Jacob. She is one of the seventy members of the Patriarch's family who emigrated from Canaan to Egypt in Genesis 46:17. Her name occurs in connection with the census taken by Moses in the wilderness in Numbers 26: 46. She is also mentioned among the descendants of Asher in 1 Chronicles 7:30. Since she is the only woman mentioned in the genealogical lists, this is believed to indicate her extraordinary longevity—an outcome of the blessing she received from Jacob. She is also the heroine of several legends.

== In the Torah ==
There are two mentions of Serach in the Torah. The first mention occurs in Genesis 46:17, which begins: "These are the names of the Israelites, Jacob and his descendants, who came to Egypt." This passage lists all of Jacob's sons, his daughter Dinah, his grandsons, and one granddaughter—Serach. The verse states, "The sons of Asher: Imnah, Ishvah, Ishvi, Beri’ah, with Serach their sister." This sentence is repeated later in the Hebrew Bible in 1 Chronicles 7:30. Given that the Torah lists 53 grandsons and only one granddaughter, it suggests that Serach was a person of significance. Additionally, Serach is mentioned a second time in the book of Numbers 26:46.

== In Sefer HaYashar ==
According to the midrashic Sefer haYashar (Hebrew: ספר הישר), Asher married Adon bat Aflal ben Hadad ben Ishmael. She died before bearing children. Asher then married Hadurah bat Abimael ben Heber ben Shem, the widow of Malkiel ben Elam ben Shem. Hadurah bore one daughter to Malkiel, whom he named Serach. After Malkiel died, the mother and daughter returned to the house of Abimael. Upon Asher's marriage to Hadurah, he adopted Serach and brought them to Canaan to live in the house of Jacob. This is one of the sources that the Talmudic tractate Megillah uses to show that an adopted child is considered the child of the adopted parent—as opposed to the genetic parent—in Jewish law. The text praises Serach for her musical skill, beauty, and intellect and notes she was raised as an Israelite.

== In tradition ==
A number of midrashim have been written about Serach. According to one midrash, Serach was not Asher's daughter but his stepdaughter. She was three years old when Asher married her mother, and she was brought up in the house of Jacob, whose affection she won by her remarkable piety and virtue. The best known of the midrashim about her tells of how she was the first to inform Jacob that his son Joseph was still alive. Fearing that the news would be too much of a shock for the old man, however, she tells a praying Jacob, through playing the harp and singing in rhyme, that Joseph is "alive and living in Egypt, and has two sons, Manasseh and Ephraim." (Egypt, in Hebrew, is Mizraim, which rhymes with Ephraim.) In return, Jacob blesses her, saying, "May you live forever and never die." According to the same midrash, Serach was eventually permitted to enter heaven alive, something achieved only by a scant few others. Further, when Moses appeared to the elders of Israel in the book of Exodus 3:16 and 4:31, they went to Serach to confirm that he (i.e., Moses) was truly the redeemer of Israel. She recognized him by the code phrase "God has surely remembered" that had been passed down, according to the midrash, from Abraham to Isaac and then to Jacob and his sons. At that stage of slavery in Egypt, no one else knew the authenticity of these code phrases as authentically as Serach.

In Genesis 50:24, Joseph speaks the same words on his deathbed. Joseph makes his brothers swear that they will bring his bones from Egypt to be buried in the land of Canaan (Genesis 50:25). The Midrash records an opinion that Moses addressed himself to Serach when he wished to learn where the remains of Joseph lay, so that the Israelites could take his bones with them when leaving Egypt (see Exodus 13:19). Without Joseph's bones, the Israelites could not leave Egypt, so the Pharaoh entombed him in a lead coffin and cast it into an underground chamber in the Nile to thwart their escape. Only Serach remained alive to remember the coffin's location, having witnessed the act while the rest of her generation had died.

According to Ecclesiastes Rabbah, Serach was the "wise woman" who caused the death of Sheba son of Bichri.

Another story, from the midrashic Pesikta de-Rav Kahana, relates that Rabbi Yohanan ben Zakkai was discussing the parting of the Red Sea and wondered what the walls of water looked like. There was a discussion in the house of study (Hebrew: בית מדרש, beit midrash) as to whether the sea took on the shape of latticework or brickwork. At some point in the discussion, Serach bat Asher peered into the study hall window and attested, "I was there. They were like lighted [brick] windows." According to another legend, Serach lived until the tribe of Asher was exiled by Shalmaneser V, went with them into exile, and died there nearly one thousand years old. According to the legend, her grave is located in Pir Bakran, a small town about 30 km southeast of Isfahan. The site comprises a small synagogue and a large cemetery, probably over two millennia old. Some consider her the guardian of Israel's communal memory.

== Cultural associations ==
- Edward Einhorn's absurdist comedy The Living Methuselah, appearing in his book of plays entitled The Golem, Methuselah, and Shylock, gives another perspective on both Serach and Methuselah. In it, Methuselah and Serach have lived to modern day, through all the major disasters of human history.

== Resources ==
- Bacher, Wilhelm and Isaac Broydé. "Serah". Jewish Encyclopedia. Funk and Wagnalls, 1901–1906.
- Sermon on Serach
