= Abdon =

Abdon may refer to:

== Places ==
- Abdon (biblical place), a Levitical city mentioned in the Hebrew Bible
- Abdon, Shropshire, a village in Shropshire, England

== People ==
- Abdon (biblical figures), several minor biblical figures
- One of two saints and martyrs, Abdon and Sennen, killed on the same day
- Abdon Ignatius Perera (1888–1955), first indigenous Postmaster General of Sri Lanka
- Abdón Porte (1880–1918), Uruguayan footballer
- Abdón Prats (born 1992), Spanish footballer
- Abdón Reyes (born 1981), Bolivian football midfielder
- Abdón Saavedra (1872–1942), Vice President of Bolivia from 1926 to 1930
- Abdon Sgarbi (1903–1929), Italian footballer
