= 1 Chronicles 8 =

First Book of Chronicles, chapter 8

- ← chapter 7 chapter 9 →
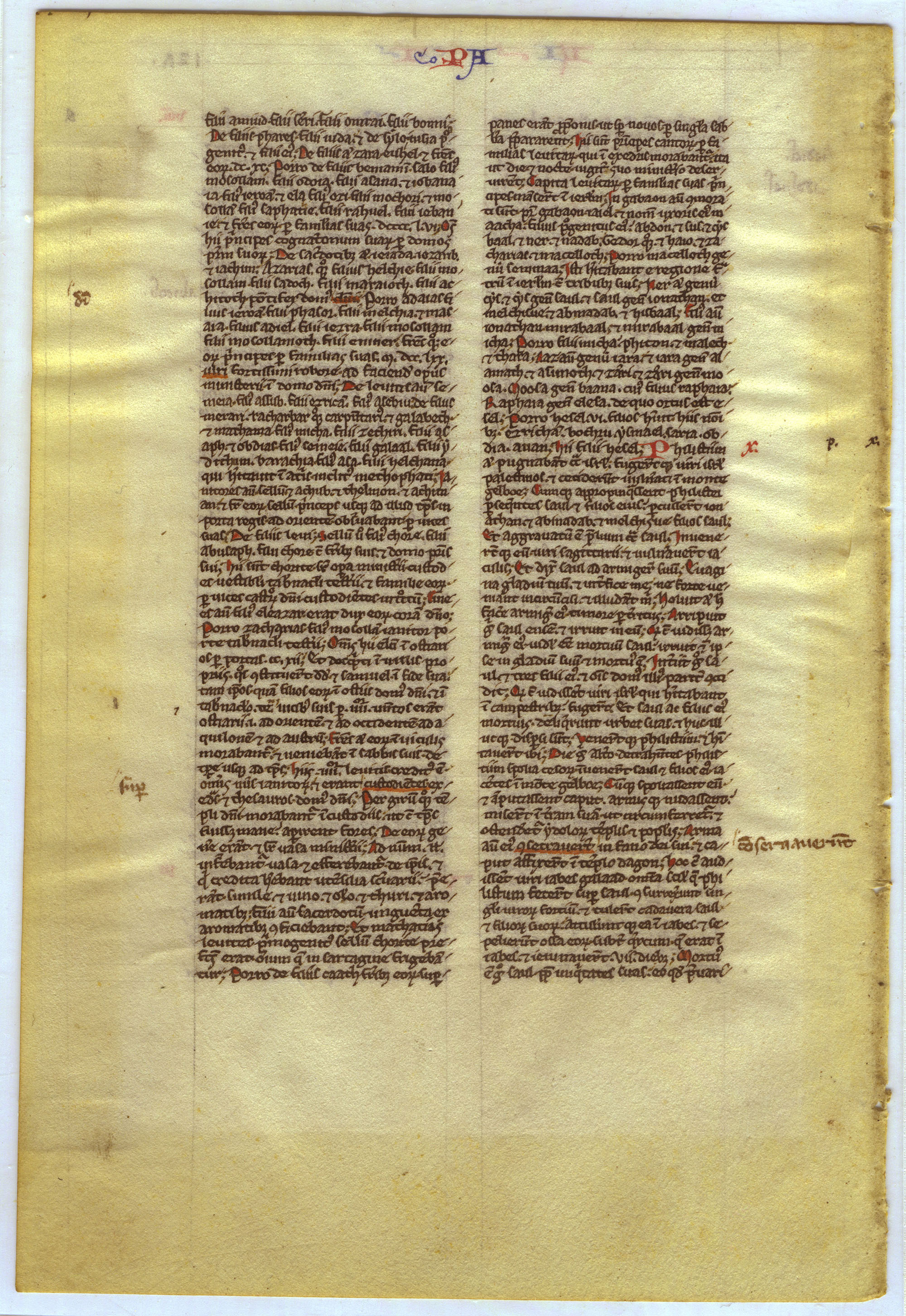
- 1 Chronicles 7:9-10:13. Vellum leaf from c. 1240 France, pearl script.
- Book: Books of Chronicles
- Category: Ketuvim
- Christian Bible part: Old Testament
- Order in the Christian part: 13

1 Chronicles 8 is the eighth chapter of the Books of Chronicles in the Hebrew Bible or the First Book of Chronicles in the Old Testament of the Christian Bible. The book is compiled from older sources by an unknown person or group, designated by modern scholars as "the Chronicler", and had the final shape established in late fifth or fourth century BCE. This chapter focuses on the tribe of Benjamin, especially the family of King Saul. It belongs to the section focusing on the list of genealogies from Adam to the lists of the people returning from exile in Babylon (1 Chronicles 1:1 to 9:34).

== Text ==
This chapter was originally written in the Hebrew language. It is divided into 40 verses.

=== Textual witnesses ===
Some early manuscripts containing the text of this chapter in Hebrew are of the Masoretic Text tradition, which includes the Aleppo Codex (10th century), and Codex Leningradensis (1008).

There is also a translation into Koine Greek known as the Septuagint, made in the last few centuries BCE. Extant ancient manuscripts of the Septuagint version include Codex Vaticanus (B; $\mathfrak{G}$^{B}; 4th century), and Codex Alexandrinus (A; $\mathfrak{G}$^{A}; 5th century). (Note: The extant Codex Sinaiticus only contains 1 Chronicles 9:27–19:17.)

=== Old Testament references ===
- 1 Chronicles 8:1: Genesis 46:21; Numbers 26:38; 1 Chronicles 7:6.

== Structure ==
The whole chapter belongs to an arrangement comprising 1 Chronicles 2:3–8:40 with the king-producing tribes of Judah (David; 2:3–4:43) and Benjamin (Saul; 8:1–40) bracketing the series of lists as the priestly tribe of Levi (6:1–81) anchors the center, in the following order:

A David’s royal tribe of Judah (2:3–4:43)

B Northern tribes east of Jordan (5:1–26)

X The priestly tribe of Levi (6:1–81)

B' Northern tribes west of Jordan (7:1–40)

A' Saul’s royal tribe of Benjamin (8:1–40)

== Descendants of Benjamin (8:1–32) ==
This section contains a second genealogy of Benjamin (after 1 Chronicles 7:6-12) and is considered as a later addition to the Chronicles, documenting family trees of individuals in the tribe of Benjamin, with dwelling places and historical notes, in four sections that end in verses 7, 12, 28 and 32, respectively. The first section is the family of Bela (verses 1–7), then followed by the family of Shaharaim (verses 8–12). Several families who lived in Aijalon and Jerusalem are listed in verses 13–28, continues with the forefathers of Saul in verses 29–32, to be followed with the genealogy of Saul in the subsequent section.

=== Verses 1–2 ===
^{1} Now Benjamin begat Bela his firstborn, Ashbel the second, and Aharah the third,
^{2} Nohah the fourth, and Rapha the fifth.

- Cross references: Genesis 46:21; Numbers 26:38; 1 Chronicles 7:6
- "Aharah": from Hebrew: אַחְרַ֖ח is written as "Ahiram" (Hebrew: אֲחִירָ֕ם) in Numbers 26:38.

=== Verse 5 ===
And their brethren among all the families of Issachar were valiant men of might, reckoned in all by their genealogies fourscore and seven thousand.

- "Reckoned": used only in Book of Ezra, Nehemiah and Chronicles, indicating the period when this list is compiled.

== Family of Saul (8:33–40) ==
This section focuses on the genealogy of Saul, nearly identical to the list in 1 Chronicles 9:35–44. Although the royal throne was occupied by David's line, the descendants of Saul was apparently still considered important, as the list continues to the ten generation after Saul's death (1 Chronicles 10) into the 8th century BCE.

=== Verse 33 ===
And Ner begat Kish, and Kish begat Saul, and Saul begat Jonathan, and Malchishua, and Abinadab, and Eshbaal.

- "Eshbaal": from Hebrew: אֶשְׁ בָּֽעַל, meaning "man of Baal", probably the original name of Saul's son that was 'corrected and disfigured' in 2 Samuel 2:8 (etc.) into "Ishbosheth" (Hebrew: איש בשת, meaning "man of shame"), to conceal the 'baal' component (which can be related to the Canaanite god, "Baal"; also the name "Baal" in verse 30 and "Meribbaal" in verse 34). In 1 Samuel 14:49, he is known as "Ishvi" (Hebrew: ישוי).

== See also ==
- Chronology of the Bible
- David and Jonathan
- Related Bible parts: Genesis 46, Numbers 26, 2 Samuel 2, 1 Chronicles 7, 1 Chronicles 9, 1 Chronicles 10

== Sources ==
- Ackroyd, Peter R (1993). "Chronicles, Books of". In Metzger, Bruce M; Coogan, Michael D (eds.). The Oxford Companion to the Bible. Oxford University Press. pp. 113–116. ISBN 978-0195046458.
- Bennett, William (2018). The Expositor's Bible: The Books of Chronicles. Litres. ISBN 978-5040825196.
- Coogan, Michael David (2007). Coogan, Michael David; Brettler, Marc Zvi; Newsom, Carol Ann; Perkins, Pheme (eds.). The New Oxford Annotated Bible with the Apocryphal/Deuterocanonical Books: New Revised Standard Version, Issue 48 (Augmented 3rd ed.). Oxford University Press. ISBN 9780195288810.
- Endres, John C. (2012). First and Second Chronicles. Liturgical Press. ISBN 9780814628447.
- Gilbert, Henry L (1897). "The Forms of the Names in 1 Chronicles 1-7 Compared with Those in Parallel Passages of the Old Testament". The American Journal of Semitic Languages and Literatures. 13 (4). Liturgical Press: 279–298. doi:10.1086/369250. JSTOR 527992.
- Hill, Andrew E. (2003). First and Second Chronicles. Zondervan. ISBN 9780310206101.
- Mabie, Frederick (2017). "I. The Chronicler's Genealogical Survey of All Israel". In Longman III, Tremper; Garland, David E (eds.). 1 and 2 Chronicles. The Expositor's Bible Commentary. Zondervan. pp. 267–308. ISBN 978-0310531814.
- Mathys, H. P. (2007). "14. 1 and 2 Chronicles". In Barton, John; Muddiman, John (eds.). The Oxford Bible Commentary (first (paperback) ed.). Oxford University Press. pp. 267–308. ISBN 978-0199277186.
- Throntveit, Mark A. (2003). "Was the Chronicler a Spin Doctor? David in the Books of Chronicles". Word & World. 23 (4): 374–381.
- Tuell, Steven S. (2012). First and Second Chronicles. Westminster John Knox Press. ISBN 978-0664238650.
- Würthwein, Ernst (1995). The Text of the Old Testament. Translated by Rhodes, Erroll F. Grand Rapids, MI: William B. Eerdmans. ISBN 0-8028-0788-7.
