= 1 Chronicles 7 =

First Book of Chronicles, chapter 7

- ← chapter 6 chapter 8 →
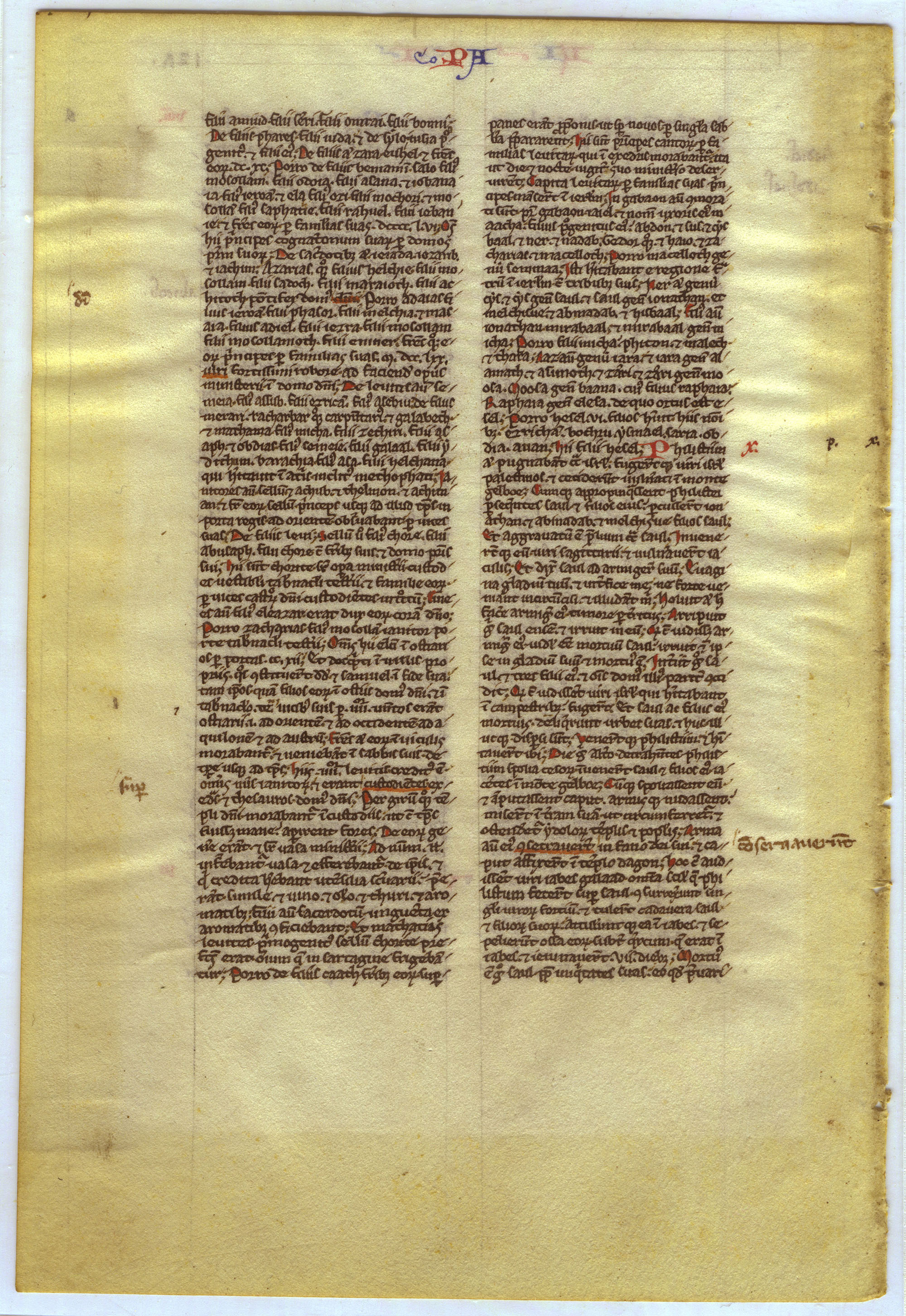
- 1 Chronicles 7:9-10:13. Vellum leaf from c. 1240 France, pearl script.
- Book: Books of Chronicles
- Category: Ketuvim
- Christian Bible part: Old Testament
- Order in the Christian part: 13

1 Chronicles 7 is the seventh chapter of the Books of Chronicles in the Hebrew Bible or the First Book of Chronicles in the Old Testament of the Christian Bible. The book is compiled from older sources by an unknown person or group, designated by modern scholars as "the Chronicler", and had the final shape established in late fifth or fourth century BCE. This chapter contains the genealogies of tribes settled north of Judah: Issachar, Benjamin, Naphtali, Manasseh, Ephraim and Asher. It belongs to the section focusing on the list of genealogies from Adam to the lists of the people returning from exile in Babylon (1 Chronicles 1:1 to 9:34).

== Text ==
This chapter was originally written in the Hebrew language. It is divided into 40 verses.

=== Textual witnesses ===
Some early manuscripts containing the text of this chapter in Hebrew are of the Masoretic Text tradition, which includes the Aleppo Codex (10th century), and Codex Leningradensis (1008).

There is also a translation into Koine Greek known as the Septuagint, made in the last few centuries BCE. Extant ancient manuscripts of the Septuagint version include Codex Vaticanus (B; $\mathfrak{G}$^{B}; 4th century), and Codex Alexandrinus (A; $\mathfrak{G}$^{A}; 5th century). (Note: The extant Codex Sinaiticus only contains 1 Chronicles 9:27–19:17.)

=== Old Testament references ===
- 1 Chronicles 7:1: Genesis 46:13; Numbers 26:23
- 1 Chronicles 7:6: Genesis 46:21; Numbers 26:38
- 1 Chronicles 7:13: Genesis 46:24; Numbers 26:48
- 1 Chronicles 7:14: Numbers 26:29
- 1 Chronicles 7:20: Numbers 26:35
- 1 Chronicles 7:30: Genesis 46:17; Numbers 26:44
- 1 Chronicles 7:31: Genesis 46:17; Numbers 26:45

== Structure ==
The whole chapter belongs to an arrangement comprising 1 Chronicles 2:3–8:40 with the king-producing tribes of Judah (David; 2:3–4:43) and Benjamin (Saul; 8:1–40) bracketing the series of lists as the priestly tribe of Levi (6:1–81) anchors the center, in the following order:

A David’s royal tribe of Judah (2:3–4:43)

B Northern tribes east of Jordan (5:1–26)

X The priestly tribe of Levi (6:1–81)

B' Northern tribes west of Jordan (7:1–40)

A' Saul’s royal tribe of Benjamin (8:1–40)

== Descendants of Issachar (7:1–5) ==
The list parallels Genesis 46:13 and Numbers 26:23–25, but with additional information about the tribe of Issachar whose allotted land was located southwest of the Sea of Galilee.

=== Verse 1 ===
Now the sons of Issachar were Tola, Puah, Jashub, and Shimron, four in all.

- Cross references: Genesis 46:13; Numbers 26:23
- "Jashub": from Hebrew: יָשׁ֥וּב yā-shūḇ (as the reading (qere); in writing: ישיב yā-shîḇ) is written as "Job" in Genesis 46:13. Rashi notes that Job was the original name, but when the brothers settled themselves (נִתְיַשְּׁבוּ) to learn Torah (cf. 1 Chronicles 12: 33), “of the sons of Issachar, who possessed understanding of the times,” he merited, so was named Jashub.

"Puah" (Hebrew: פוּאָ֛ה): written as Puvvah (פֻוָּ֖ה) in Genesis 46:13, and Puvah (פֻוָ֕ה) in Numbers 26:23.

=== Verse 5 ===
And their brethren among all the families of Issachar were valiant men of might, reckoned in all by their genealogies fourscore and seven thousand.

- "Reckoned": used only in Book of Ezra, Nehemiah and Chronicles, indicating the period when this list is compiled.

== Descendants of Benjamin (7:6–12) ==
This is one of varying Benjamin's genealogies in Chronicles and other Old Testament documents, with one uniting element: Bela is Benjamin's firstborn son (cf. Genesis 46:21; Numbers 26:38; 1 Chronicles 8:1). A longer genealogy is listed in 1 Chronicles 8:1–28.

=== Verse 6 ===
The sons of Benjamin; Bela, and Becher, and Jediael, three.

- "Becher": from Hebrew: בכר; with different vowels would mean "firstborn", so the original reading in Genesis 46:21 and here ("Bela and Becher and"; Hebrew: בלעובכרו) may have been Bela bechoro (Hebrew: בלעבכרו), "Bela his firstborn," as in 1 Chronicles 8:1.

=== Verse 12 ===
And Shuppim and Huppim were the sons of Ir, Hushim the son of Aher.

- "Shuppim": is written as "Shupham" or "Shephupham" in Numbers 26:39.
- "Huppim": is written as "Hupham" in Numbers 26:39.
- "Ir": is written as "Iri" in verse 7.
- "Aher": is written as "Ahiram" in Numbers 26:38.

== Descendants of Naphtali (7:13) ==
The genealogy consists of only one verse, paralleling Genesis 46:24 and Numbers 26:48–50.

== Descendants of Manasseh (7:14–19) ==
The list is difficult to understand because of possible transmission corruption in some places since it differs from older source (Numbers 26:29–34). It also parallels Joshua 17:1–6.

=== Verse 15 ===
And Machir took to wife the sister of Huppim and Shuppim, whose sister's name was Maachah; and the name of the second was Zelophehad: and Zelophehad had daughters.

- "Zelophehad had daughters": Five daughters are named and play a significant role in Numbers 27:1–11 and 36:1–12 for the reinterpretation of laws of heredity which traditionally was only restricted to sons.

== Descendants of Ephraim (7:20–29) ==
This section consists of 3 parts:

1. genealogy of Ephraim
2. a story
3. genealogy of Joshua (continuation of verse 21a)

Joshua's genealogy resembles David's in 1 Chronicles 2:1–15.

=== Verse 22 ===
And Ephraim their father mourned many days, and his brothers came to comfort him.

This verse recalls the opening of the story of Job (Job 2:11) suggesting that the Chronicler wished to draw a parallel between Job and Ephraim,

== Descendants of Asher (7:30–40) ==
The first part of Asher's genealogy parallels Genesis 46:17 and Numbers 26:44-7, but the rest has no other parallel and contains far more non-Hebrew names than other biblical documents.

== See also ==
- Chronology of the Bible
- Joshua
- Related Bible parts: Genesis 46, Numbers 26, Numbers 27, Numbers 36, Joshua 17, 1 Chronicles 8

== Sources ==
- Ackroyd, Peter R (1993). "Chronicles, Books of". In Metzger, Bruce M; Coogan, Michael D (eds.). The Oxford Companion to the Bible. Oxford University Press. pp. 113–116. ISBN 978-0195046458.
- Bennett, William (2018). The Expositor's Bible: The Books of Chronicles. Litres. ISBN 978-5040825196.
- Coogan, Michael David (2007). Coogan, Michael David; Brettler, Marc Zvi; Newsom, Carol Ann; Perkins, Pheme (eds.). The New Oxford Annotated Bible with the Apocryphal/Deuterocanonical Books: New Revised Standard Version, Issue 48 (Augmented 3rd ed.). Oxford University Press. ISBN 9780195288810.
- Endres, John C. (2012). First and Second Chronicles. Liturgical Press. ISBN 9780814628447.
- Gilbert, Henry L (1897). "The Forms of the Names in 1 Chronicles 1-7 Compared with Those in Parallel Passages of the Old Testament". The American Journal of Semitic Languages and Literatures. 13 (4). Liturgical Press: 279–298. doi:10.1086/369250. JSTOR 527992.
- Hill, Andrew E. (2003). First and Second Chronicles. Zondervan. ISBN 9780310206101.
- Mabie, Frederick (2017). "I. The Chronicler's Genealogical Survey of All Israel". In Longman III, Tremper; Garland, David E (eds.). 1 and 2 Chronicles. The Expositor's Bible Commentary. Zondervan. pp. 267–308. ISBN 978-0310531814.
- Mathys, H. P. (2007). "14. 1 and 2 Chronicles". In Barton, John; Muddiman, John (eds.). The Oxford Bible Commentary (first (paperback) ed.). Oxford University Press. pp. 267–308. ISBN 978-0199277186.
- Throntveit, Mark A. (2003). "Was the Chronicler a Spin Doctor? David in the Books of Chronicles". Word & World. 23 (4): 374–381.
- Tuell, Steven S. (2012). First and Second Chronicles. Westminster John Knox Press. ISBN 978-0664238650.
- Ulrich, Eugene, ed. (2010). The Biblical Qumran Scrolls: Transcriptions and Textual Variants. Brill.
- Würthwein, Ernst (1995). The Text of the Old Testament. Translated by Rhodes, Erroll F. Grand Rapids, MI: William B. Eerdmans. ISBN 0-8028-0788-7.
