= Shashak =

King ancestor and father

Shashak is an ancestor of King Saul and the father of Elam in the Books of Chronicles (Chronicles I 8:14). He, like Elpaal, Beriah, Shema, and Jeremoth, was the head of his family (or clan) and lived in post-exilic Jerusalem.
