= Vayigash =

Eleventh portion in the annual Jewish cycle of weekly Torah reading

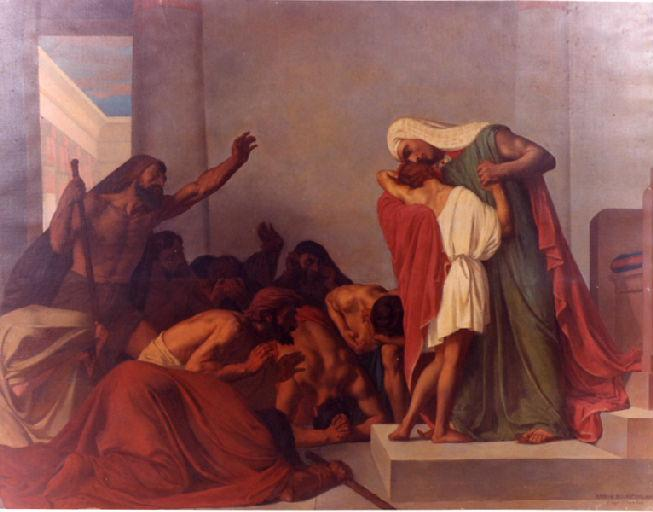
Joseph Recognized by His Brothers (1863 painting by Léon Pierre Urbain Bourgeois)

Vayigash or Vaigash (Hebrew: וַיִּגַּשׁ, romanized: wayyiggaš, lit. 'and [then] he drew near', the first word of the parashah) is the eleventh weekly Torah portion (פָּרָשָׁה, parashah) in the annual Jewish cycle of Torah reading. It constitutes Genesis 44:18–47:27.

In this parashah, Judah pleads on behalf of his brother Benjamin, Joseph reveals himself to his brothers, Jacob comes down to Biblical Egypt, and Joseph's administration of Egypt saves lives but transforms all the Egyptians into serfs.

The parashah is made up of 5680 Hebrew letters, 1480 Hebrew words, 106 verses, and 178 lines in a sefer Torah. Jews read it the eleventh Shabbat after Simchat Torah, generally in December or early January.

== Readings ==
In traditional Sabbath Torah reading, the parashah is divided into seven readings, or עליות, aliyot. In the Masoretic Text of the Tanakh (Hebrew Bible), Parashah Vayigash has no "open portion" (פתוחה, petuchah) divisions (roughly equivalent to paragraphs, often abbreviated with the Hebrew letter פ (peh)). Parashah Vayigash has three, lesser, "closed portion" (סתומה, setumah) divisions (abbreviated with the Hebrew letter ס (samekh)). The first closed portion includes the first four readings and part of the fifth reading. The second closed portion includes the rest of the fifth reading. And the third closed portion includes the sixth and seventh readings.

=== First reading—Genesis 44:18–30 ===
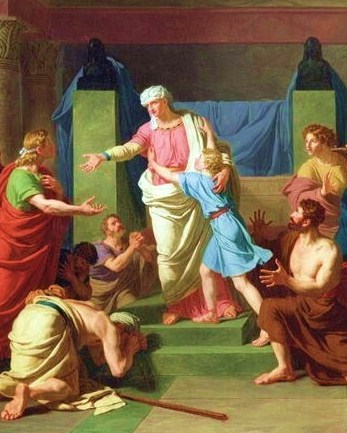
Joseph identified by his brothers (1789 painting by Charles Thévenin)

In the first reading, Judah approached Joseph, whom he likened to Pharaoh, and recounted how Joseph had asked the 10 brothers whether they had a father or brother, and they had told him that they had a father who was an old man (Jacob), and a child of his old age who was a little one (Benjamin), whose brother was dead, who alone was left of his mother (Rachel), and whose father loved him. Judah recalled how Joseph had told the brothers to bring their younger brother down to Egypt, they had told Joseph that the lad's leaving would kill his father, but Joseph had insisted. Judah recalled how the brothers had told their father Joseph's words, and when their father had told them to go again to buy a little food, they had reminded him that they could not go down without their youngest brother. Judah recounted how their father had told them that his wife had borne him two sons, one had gone out and was torn in pieces, and if they took the youngest and harm befell him, it would bring down his gray hairs with sorrow to the grave. Judah began to explain to Joseph what would happen if Judah were to come to his father without the lad, seeing that his father's soul was bound up with the lad's. The first reading ends here.

=== Second reading—Genesis 44:31–45:7 ===
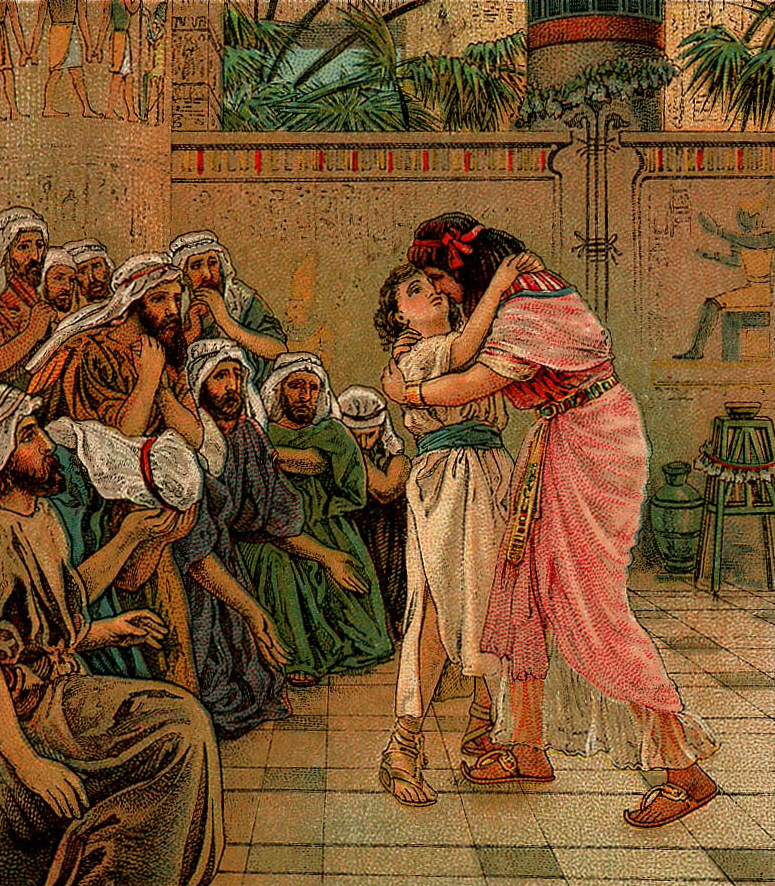
Joseph Forgives His Brothers (illustration from a Bible card published 1907 by the Providence Lithograph Company)

In the second reading, Judah told Joseph that if Judah were to come to his father without the lad, then his father would die in sorrow. And Judah told how he had become surety for the lad, and thus asked Joseph to allow him to remain a bondman to Joseph instead of the lad, for how could he go up to his father if the lad was not with him? Joseph could no longer control his emotions and ordered everyone but his brothers to leave the room. He wept aloud, and the Egyptians and the house of Pharaoh heard. Joseph told his brothers that he was Joseph, and asked them whether his father was still alive, but his brothers were too frightened to answer him. Joseph asked them to come near, told them that he was Joseph their brother whom they had sold into Egypt, but that they should not be grieved, for God had sent Joseph before them to preserve life. Joseph recounted how for two years there had been famine in the land, but there would be five more years without harvests. But God had sent him before them to save them alive for a great deliverance. The second reading ends here.

=== Third reading—Genesis 45:8–18 ===
In the third reading, Joseph told his brothers that it was not they who sent him to Egypt, but God, who had made him ruler over all Egypt. Joseph thus directed them to go quickly to his father and convey that God had made him lord of all Egypt and his father should come down to live in the land of Goshen and Joseph would sustain him for the five years of famine. And Joseph and his brother Benjamin wept on each other's necks, Joseph kissed all his brothers and wept upon them, and after that, his brothers talked with him. The report went through Pharaoh's house that Joseph's brothers had come, and it pleased Pharaoh. Pharaoh directed Joseph to tell his brothers to go to Canaan and bring their father and their households back to Egypt. The third reading ends here.

=== Fourth reading—Genesis 45:19–27 ===
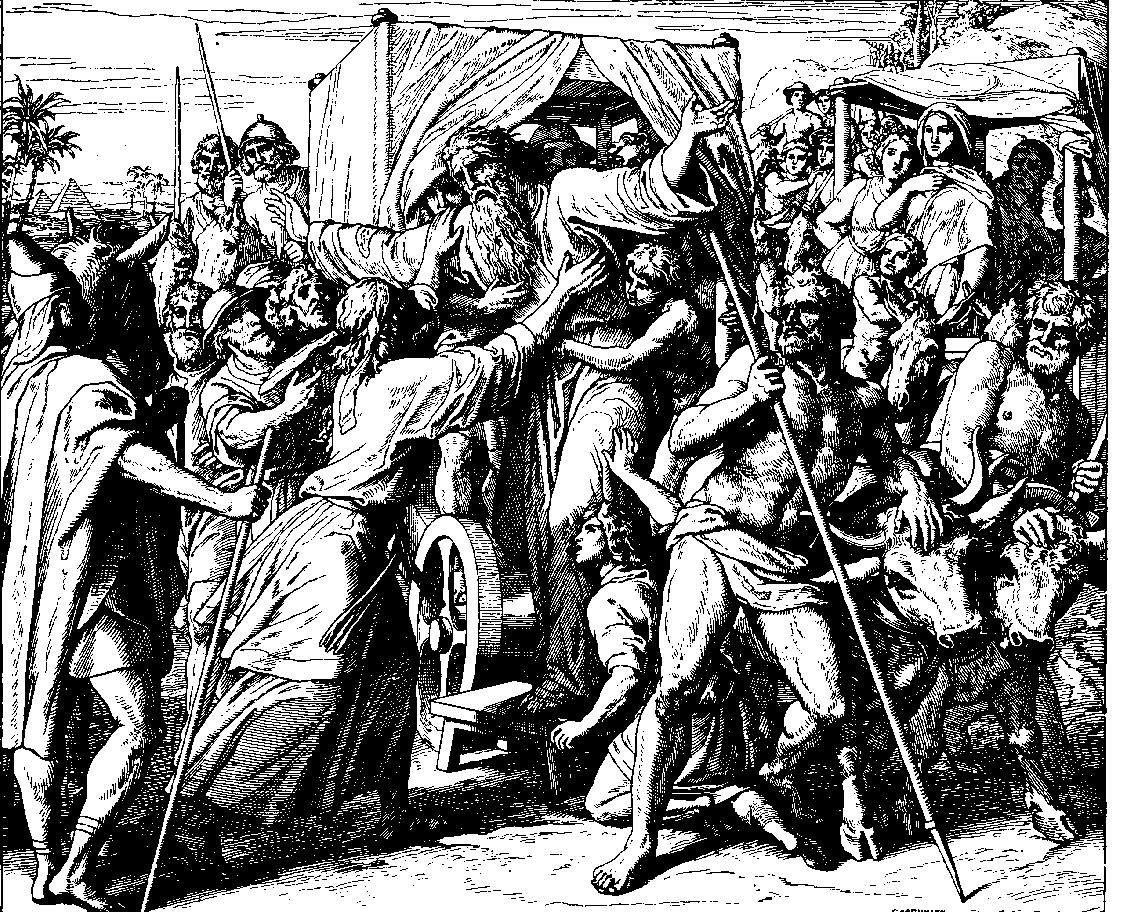
Jacob Comes Into Egypt (woodcut by Julius Schnorr von Carolsfeld from the 1860 Die Bibel in Bildern)

In the fourth reading, Joseph gave his brothers wagons and provisions for the way, and to each man he gave a change of clothes, but to Benjamin he gave 300 shekels of silver and five changes of clothes. And Joseph sent his father ten donkeys laden with the good things of Egypt, and ten donkeys laden with food. So Joseph sent his brothers away, enjoining them not to fall out on the way. The brothers went to their father Jacob in Canaan and told him that Joseph was still alive and ruled over Egypt, but he did not believe them. They told him what Joseph had said, and when Jacob saw the wagons that Joseph had sent, Jacob revived. The fourth reading ends here.

=== Fifth reading—Genesis 45:28–46:27 ===
In the long fifth reading, Jacob said that he would go to see Joseph before he died. Jacob journeyed to Beersheba with all that he had and offered sacrifices to God. God spoke to Jacob in a dream, saying that Jacob should not fear to go to Egypt, for God would go with him, make a great nation of him, and also surely bring him back. Jacob's sons carried him, their little ones, and their wives in the wagons that Pharaoh had sent. They took their cattle and their goods and came to Egypt, Jacob, and his entire family. The first closed portion ends here.

The continuation of the fifth reading lists the names of Jacob's family, 70 men in all, including Joseph and his two children. The long fifth reading and the second closed portion end here.

=== Sixth reading—Genesis 46:28–47:10 ===
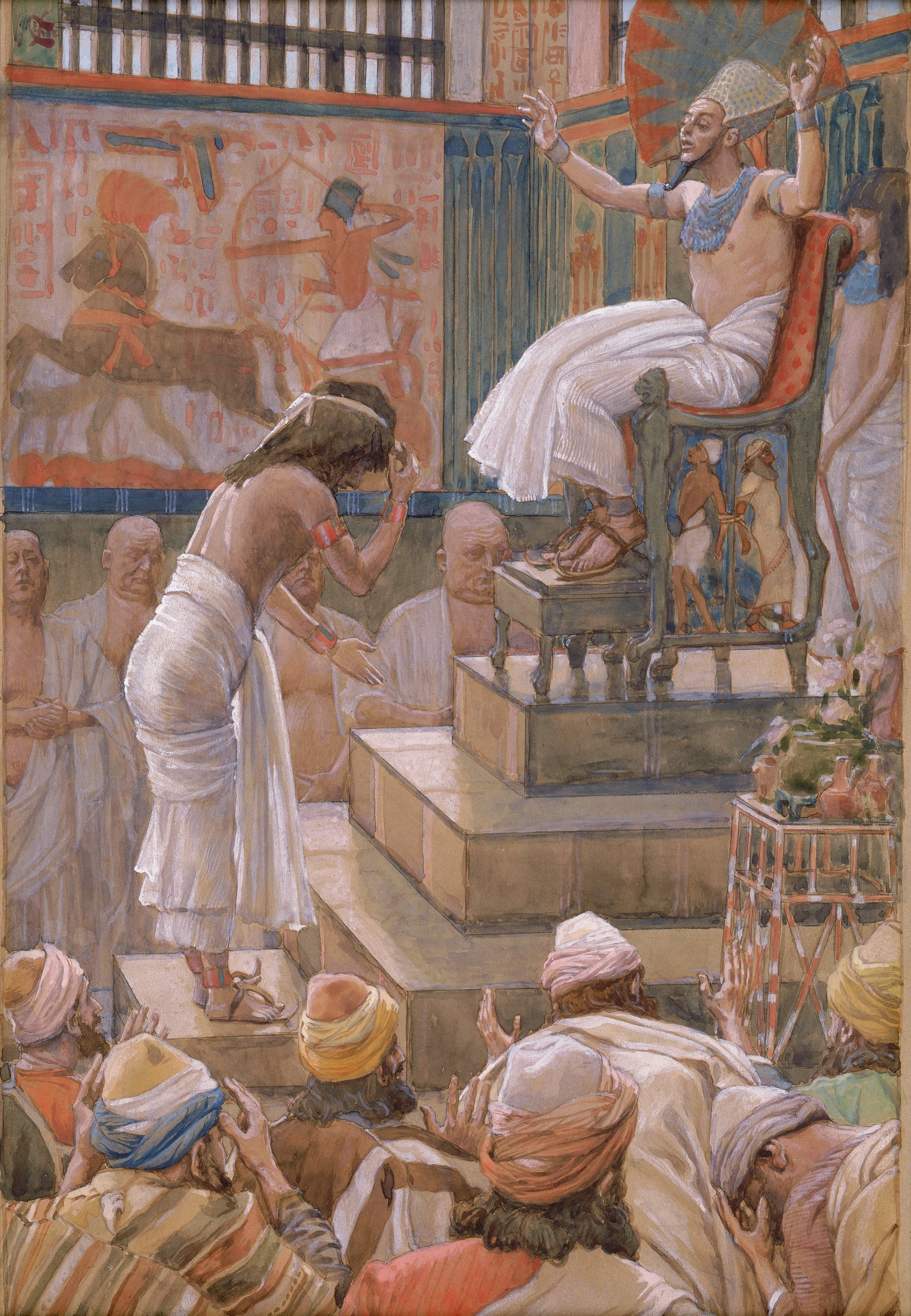
Joseph and His Brethren Welcomed by Pharaoh (watercolor circa 1896–1902 by James Tissot)

In the sixth reading, Jacob sent Judah before him to show the way to Goshen. Joseph went up to Goshen in his chariot to meet Jacob, and fell on his neck and wept. Jacob told Joseph that now he could die, since he had seen Joseph's face. Joseph told his brothers that he would go tell Pharaoh that his brothers had come, that they kept cattle, and that they had brought their flocks, herds, and all their possessions. Joseph instructed them that when Pharaoh asked them their occupation, they should say that they were keepers of cattle, for shepherds were an abomination to the Egyptians. Joseph told Pharaoh that his family had arrived in the land of Goshen, and presented five of his brothers to Pharaoh. Pharaoh asked the brothers what their occupation was, and they told Pharaoh that they were shepherds and asked to live in the land of Goshen. Pharaoh told Joseph that his family could live in the best of the land, in Goshen, and if he knew any able men among them, then he could appoint them to watch over Pharaoh's cattle. Joseph set Jacob before Pharaoh, and Jacob blessed Pharaoh. Pharaoh asked Jacob how old he was, and Jacob answered that he was 130 years old and that few and evil had been the years of his life. Jacob blessed Pharaoh and left. The sixth reading ends here.

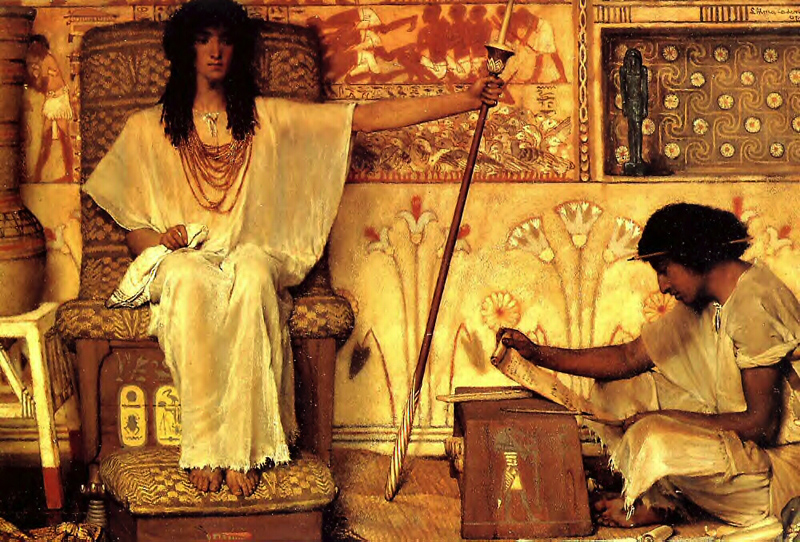
Joseph Overseer of the Pharaohs Granaries (1874 painting by Lawrence Alma-Tadema)

=== Seventh reading—Genesis 47:11–27 ===
In the seventh reading, Joseph placed his father and brothers in the land of Rameses, as Pharaoh had commanded, and sustained them with bread while the famine became sore in the land. Joseph gathered all the money in Egypt and Canaan selling grain and brought the money into Pharaoh's house. When the Egyptians exhausted their money and asked Joseph for bread, Joseph sold them bread in exchange for all their animals. When they had no more animals, they offered to sell their land to Joseph and become bondmen in exchange for bread. So Joseph bought all the land of Egypt for Pharaoh—except for that of the priests, who had a portion from Pharaoh—and in exchange for seed, Joseph made all the Egyptians bondmen. At harvest time, Joseph collected for Pharaoh a fifth part of all the people harvested.

In the maftir (מפטיר) reading that concludes the parashah, it continued as a statute in Egypt that Pharaoh should have a fifth of all produced outside of the priests' land. And Israel lived in Egypt, in the land of Goshen, accumulated possessions, and was fruitful and multiplied. The seventh reading and the parashah end here.

=== Readings according to the triennial cycle ===
Jews who read the Torah according to the triennial cycle of Torah reading read the parashah according to the following schedule:

	Year 1	Year 2	Year 3
	Dec. 2023, Dec. 2026, Dec. 2029 . . .	Jan. 2025, Jan. 2028, Jan. 2031 . . .	Dec. 2025, Dec. 2028, Dec. 2031 . . .
Reading	44:18–45:27	45:28–46:27	46:28–47:27
1	44:18–20	45:28–46:4	46:28–30
2	44:21–24	46:5–7	46:31–34
3	44:25–30	46:8–11	47:1–6
4	44:31–34	46:12–15	47:7–10
5	45:1–7	46:16–18	47:11–19
6	45:8–18	46:19–22	47:20–22
7	45:19–27	46:23–27	47:23–27
Maftir	45:25–27	46:23–27	47:25–27

== In ancient parallels ==
The parashah has parallels in these ancient sources:

=== Genesis chapter 45 ===
Gerhard von Rad argued that the Joseph narrative is closely related to earlier Egyptian wisdom writings. Von Rad likened the theology of Joseph's statement to his brothers in Genesis 45:5–8, “And now be not grieved, nor angry with yourselves, that you sold me here; for God sent me before you to preserve life. . . . So now it was not you who sent me here, but God; and [God] made me a father to Pharaoh, and lord of all his house, and ruler over all the land of Egypt,” to that of Amenemope, who said, “That which men propose is one thing; what God does is another,” and “God’s life is achievement, but man’s is denial.”

== In inner-Biblical interpretation ==
The parashah has parallels or is discussed in these Biblical sources:

=== Genesis chapter 44 ===
In Genesis 44:19–23, Judah retells the events first told in Genesis 42:7–20.

The narrator in Genesis 42	Judah in Genesis 44
^{7}And Joseph saw his brethren, and he knew them, but made himself strange to them, and spoke roughly with them; and he said to them: "From where do you come?" And they said: "From the land of Canaan to buy food." ^{8}And Joseph knew his brethren, but they did not know him. ^{9}And Joseph remembered the dreams that he dreamed of them, and said to them: "You are spies; to see the nakedness of the land you are come." ^{10}And they said to him: "No, my lord, but to buy food are your servants come. ^{11}We are all one man's sons; we are upright men; your servants are no spies." ^{12}And he said to them: "No, but to see the nakedness of the land you are come."	^{19}My lord asked his servants, saying: "Have you a father, or a brother?"
^{13}And they said: "We your servants are twelve brethren, the sons of one man in the land of Canaan; and, behold, the youngest is this day with our father, and one is not."	^{20}And we said to my lord: "We have a father, an old man, and a child of his old age, a little one; and his brother is dead, and he alone is left of his mother, and his father loves him."
^{14}And Joseph said to them: "That is it that I spoke to you, saying: You are spies. ^{15}Hereby you shall be proved, as Pharaoh lives, you shall not go there, unless your youngest brother comes here. ^{16}Send one of you, and let him fetch your brother, and you shall be bound, that your words may be proved, whether there be truth in you; or else, as Pharaoh lives, surely you are spies." ^{17}And he put them all together into ward three days. ^{18}And Joseph said to them the third day. "This do, and live; for I fear God: ^{19}if you are upright men, let one of your brethren be bound in your prison-house; but go, carry corn for the famine of your houses; ^{20}and bring your youngest brother to me; so shall your words be verified, and you shall not die." And they did so.	^{21}And you said to your servants: "Bring him down to me, that I may set mine eyes upon him." ^{22}And we said to my lord: "The lad cannot leave his father; for if he should leave his father, his father would die." ^{23}And you said to your servants: "Except your youngest brother come down with you, you shall see my face no more."

=== Genesis chapter 45 ===
Von Rad likened Joseph's magnanimity in Genesis 45:4–5 to that of Proverbs 24:29, which counsels: "Say not: 'I will do so to him as he has done to me; I will render to the man according to his work.'" And Von Rad likened the theology of Joseph's statement to his brothers in Genesis 45:5–8, "And now be not grieved, nor angry with yourselves, that you sold me here; for God sent me before you to preserve life. . . . So now it was not you who sent me here, but God; and [God] made me a father to Pharaoh, and lord of all his house, and ruler over all the land of Egypt," to that of Proverbs 16:9, "A man's heart devises his way; but the Lord directs his steps"; Proverbs 19:21, "There are many devices in a man's heart; but the counsel of the Lord, that shall stand"; Proverbs 20:24, "A man's goings are of the Lord; how then can man look to his way?"; and Proverbs 21:30–31, "There is no wisdom nor understanding nor counsel against the Lord. The horse is prepared against the day of battle; but victory is of the Lord."

Joseph's explanation in Genesis 45:5 that God sent him to Egypt before his brothers to preserve life finds an echo in Genesis 50:20, where Joseph told his brothers that they meant evil against him, but God meant it for good to save the lives of many people. Similarly, Psalm 105:16–17 reports that God called a famine upon the land and sent Joseph before the children of Israel.

=== Genesis chapter 47 ===
Jacob's blessing of Pharaoh in Genesis 47:7 echoes the promise of Genesis 12:3, 22:18, 26:4, and 28:14 that through Abraham's descendants would other families of the earth be blessed.

The report of Genesis 47:27 that the Israelites were fruitful and multiplied finds an echo in Exodus 1:7.

== In early nonrabbinic interpretation ==
The parashah has parallels or is discussed in these early nonrabbinic sources:

=== Genesis chapter 44 ===
Philo observed that having attained authority and presented with the opportunity to avenge his brothers' ill-treatment of him, Joseph nonetheless bore what happened with self-restraint and governed himself.

=== Genesis chapter 47 ===
Philo read Jacob's words in Genesis 47:9, "The days of the years of my life which I spend here as a sojourner have been few and evil; they have not come up to the days of my fathers which they spent as Sojourners," to support the general proposition that the Torah represents the wise people whom it mentions as sojourners whose souls are sent down from heaven to earth as to a foreign land. Philo taught that wise people see themselves as sojourners in a foreign land—the body perceptible by the senses—and view the virtues appreciable by the intellect as their native land.

== In classical rabbinic interpretation ==
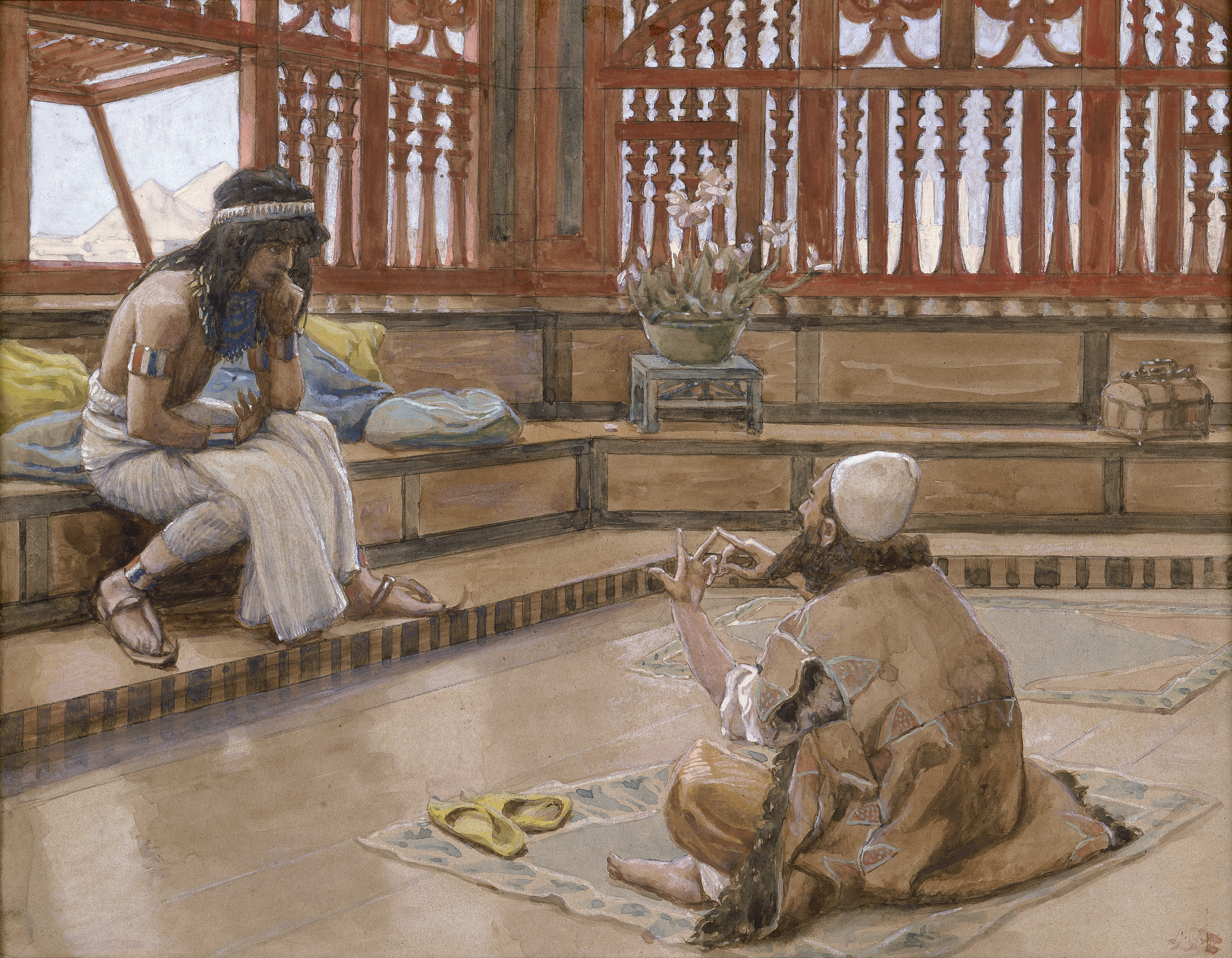
Joseph Converses with Judah, His Brother (watercolor circa 1896–1902 by James Tissot)

The parashah is discussed in these rabbinic sources from the era of the Mishnah and the Talmud:

=== Genesis chapter 44 ===
In Genesis Rabbah, the tanna Judah bar Ilai taught that Scripture speaks in praise of Judah, son of Jacob. Bar Ilai noted that on three occasions, scripture records that Judah spoke before his brethren and they made him king over them (bowing to his authority):

1. in Genesis 37:26, which reports, "Judah said to his brethren: ‘What profit is it if we slay our brother'"
2. in Genesis 44:14, which reports, "Judah and his brethren came to Joseph's house"; and
3. in Genesis 44:18, which reports, "Then Judah came near" to Joseph to argue for Benjamin.

A midrash taught that, as reported in the words "Judah came near to him" in Genesis 44:18, Judah did not cease from answering Joseph word for word until he penetrated to his very heart. Bar Ilai taught that in the words of Genesis 44:18, "Judah came near" for battle, as in 2 Samuel 10:13, where it says: "So Joab and the people that were with him drew near to battle."

Rabbi Neḥemiah said that "Judah came near" for conciliation, as in Joshua 14:6, where it says that "the children of Judah drew near to Joshua" to conciliate him. The Chazal said that coming near implies prayer, as in 1 Kings 18:36, where it says that "Elijah the prophet came near" to pray to God.

Jeremiah bar Shemaya combined all these views, teaching that "Judah came near to him" ready for battle, conciliation, or prayer. Bar Shemaya taught that Judah exclaimed that he would only need to utter one word (dabar) and bring a plague (deber) upon the Egyptians. Rabbi Ḥanin taught that Judah became angry, and the hairs of his chest pierced through his clothes and forced their way out, and he put iron bars into his mouth and ground them to powder.

Judah ben Ezekiel taught that three things shorten a person's years:

1. to be given a sefer Torah from which to read and to refuse
2. to be given a cup of benediction over which to say grace and to refuse
3. to assume airs of authority.

To support the proposition that assuming airs of authority shortens one's life, the Gemara cited the teaching of Ḥama bar Ḥanina that Joseph died (as Genesis 50:26 reports, aged 110) before his brothers because he assumed airs of authority (when in Genesis 43:28 and 44:24–32 he repeatedly allowed his brothers to describe his father Jacob as "your servant").

Bar Ezekiel asked in the name of Abba Arikha why Joseph referred to himself as "bones" during his lifetime in Genesis 50:25, and explained that it was because he did not protect his father's honor when in Genesis 44:31 his brothers called Jacob "your servant our father" and Joseph failed to protest. And Rav Judah also said in the name of Rav (and others say that it was Rabbi Ḥama bar Ḥanina who said) that Joseph died before his brothers because he put on superior airs. Similarly, a Midrash taught that Joseph was referred to as "bones" during his lifetime (in Genesis 50:25) because when his brothers referred to his father as "your servant our father" in Genesis 44:24, Joseph kept silent. Thus the Midrash taught that the words of Proverbs 29:23, "A man's pride shall bring him low," apply to Joseph, who in this encounter ostentatiously displayed his authority.

Similarly, as Exodus 1:6 reports that "Joseph died, and all his brethren," the Chazal concluded that Joseph died before his brothers. Judah haNasi taught that Joseph died before his brothers because Joseph "commanded his servants the physicians to embalm his father" (as Genesis 50:2 reports). But the Chazal taught that Jacob had directed his sons to embalm him, as Genesis 50:12 reports that "his sons did to him as he commanded them." According to the Rabbis, Joseph died before his brothers because nearly five times Judah said to Joseph, "Your servant my father, your servant my father" (four times himself in Genesis 44:24, 27, 30, and 31, and once together with his brothers in Genesis 43:48), yet Joseph heard it and kept silent (not correcting Judah to show humility to their father).

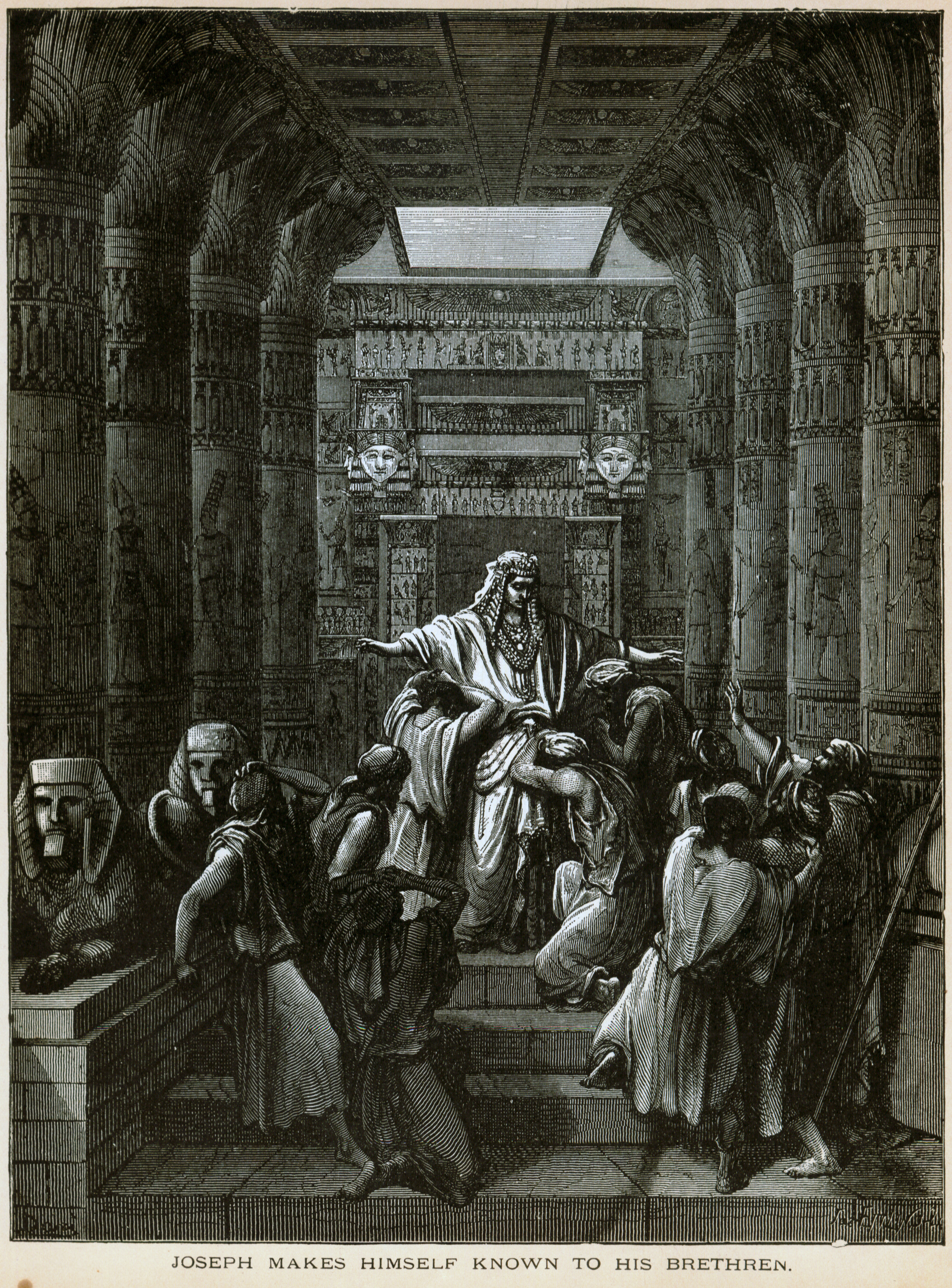
Joseph Makes Himself Known to His Brethren (engraving by Gustave Doré from the 1865 La Sainte Bible)

Eliezer ben Matiah, Hananiah ben Kinai, Simeon ben Azzai, and Simeon the Yemenite deduced from Judah's offer to remain instead of Benjamin in Genesis 44:33 that Judah merited the kingship because of his humility.

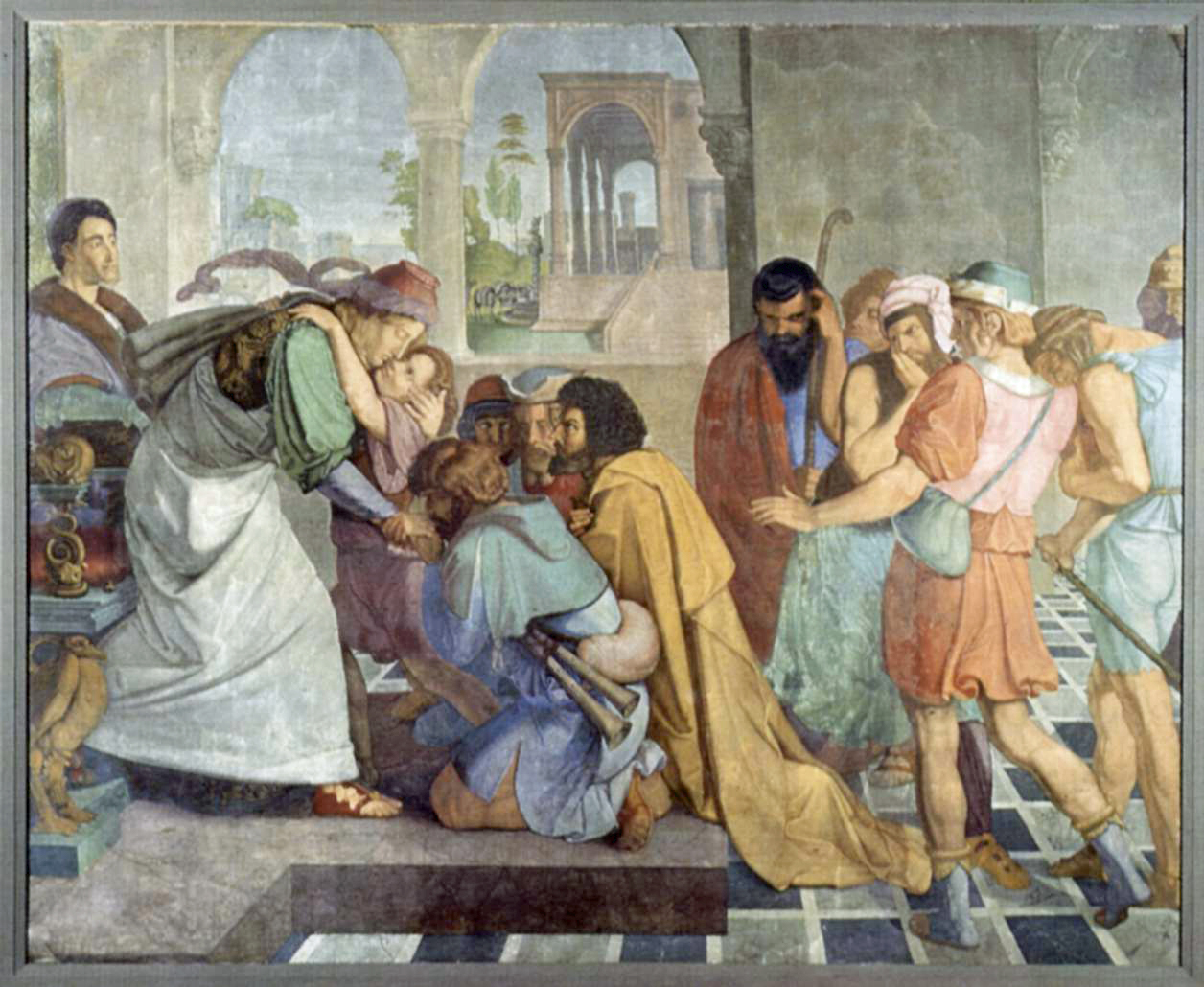
Joseph Reveals His Identity (painting circa 1816–1817 by Peter von Cornelius)

=== Genesis chapter 45 ===
Rabbi Ḥama bar Ḥanina and Rabbi Samuel ben Naḥmani differed about how prudent it was for Joseph to clear the room in Genesis 45:1. Rabbi Ḥama thought that Joseph acted imprudently, for one of them could have kicked him and killed him on the spot. But Rabbi Samuel said that Joseph acted rightly and prudently, for he knew the righteousness of his brethren and reasoned that it would not be right to suspect that they might commit bloodshed.

Rabbi Elazar wept whenever he read Genesis 45:3, for if men became too frightened to answer a wronged brother, how much more frightening will they find God's rebuke.

A Midrash taught that "Joseph said to his brethren: ‘Come near to me'" in Genesis 45:4 so that he might show them his circumcision to prove that he was their brother.

Reading Joseph's reassurance to his brothers in Genesis 45:5, "And now be not grieved, nor angry with yourselves, that you sold me hither; for God sent me before you to preserve life," our Sages observed that even the wrongs done by the righteous are of service to the world, and how much more their righteous deeds.

Reading Joseph's assertion to his brothers in Genesis 45:5, "God sent me before you to preserve life," the Mishnat Rabbi Eliezer taught that when a person seeks to injure an enemy, the person bars the enemy from getting any cure, but God is not so. God provides the cure before the blow, as it says in Hosea 7:1, "I would heal Israel even as the iniquity of Ephraim is uncovered." So in the days of Joseph, God did not inflict famine on the Tribal Ancestors until God had sent Joseph before them.

The Tosefta deduced from Genesis 45:6 that before Jacob went down to Egypt there was famine there, but after he arrived, as Genesis 47:23 reports, they sowed the land with seed.

Rabbi Levi used Genesis 37:2, 41:46, and 45:6 to calculate that Joseph's dreams that his brothers would bow to him took 22 years to come true, and deduced that a person should thus wait for as much as 22 years for a positive dream's fulfillment. Rav Huna in the name of Rabbi Joshua used Genesis 45:6 as a mnemonic for calculating what year it was in the Sabbatical cycle of seven years. The Gemara used Genesis 45:6 to help calculate (among other things) that Jacob should have been 116 years old when he came to Egypt, but since Genesis 47:8–9 indicated that Jacob was then 130 years old, the Gemara deduced that the text did not count 14 years that Jacob spent studying in the Academy of Eber.

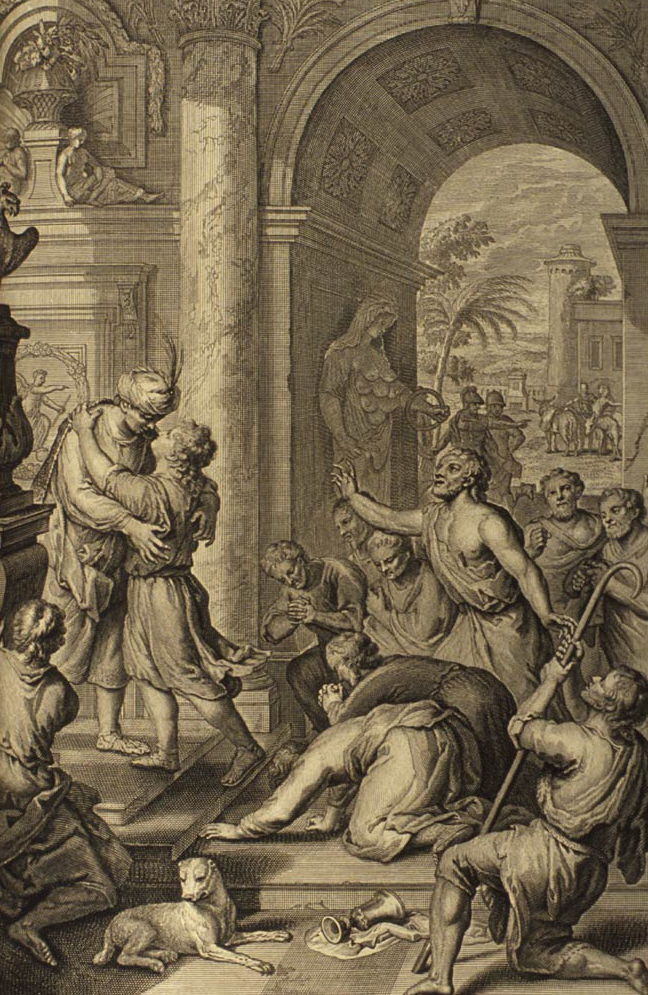
Joseph Makes Himself Known to His Brethren (illustration from the 1728 Figures de la Bible by Giuseppe il Nutritore)

Rabbi Elazar interpreted Joseph's reference to Benjamin in Genesis 45:12 to mean that just as Joseph bore no malice against his brother Benjamin (who had no part in selling Joseph to Egypt), so Joseph had no malice against his other brothers. And Rabbi Elazar interpreted Joseph's reference to his mouth in Genesis 45:12 to mean that Joseph's words reflected what was in his heart. A Midrash interpreted Joseph's reference to his mouth in Genesis 45:12 to mean that Joseph asked them to note that he spoke in Hebrew.

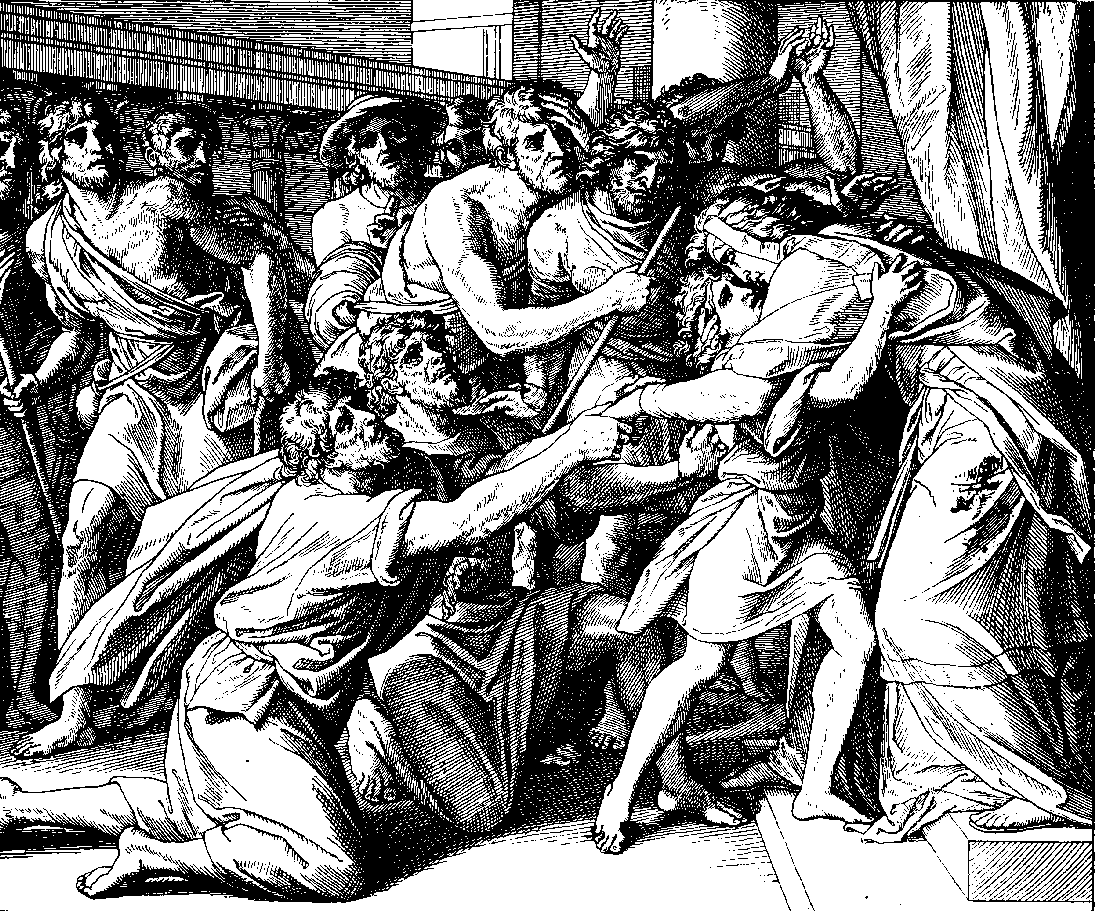
Joseph Reveals Himself to His Brothers (woodcut by Julius Schnorr von Carolsfeld from the 1860 Die Bibel in Bildern)

Rabbi Elazar noted that Genesis 45:14 uses the plural form of the word "necks" and asked how many necks Benjamin had. Rabbi Elazar deduced that Joseph wept on Benjamin's neck for the two Temples that were destined to be in the territory of the tribe of Benjamin and be destroyed. And Rabbi Elazar deduced that Benjamin wept on Joseph's neck for the tabernacle of Shiloh that was destined to be in the territory of the tribe of Joseph and be destroyed.

Examining Genesis 45:22, the Gemara asked whether Joseph repeated his father's mistake of favoring one sibling over the others. Rabbi Benjamin bar Japhet said that Joseph was hinting to Benjamin that one of his descendants, Mordecai, would appear before a king in five royal garments, as Esther 8:15 reports.

Rabbi Benjamin bar Japhet in the name of Rabbi Elazar deduced from Genesis 45:23 that Joseph sent Jacob aged wine, which the Rabbi reported pleases the elderly. But a Midrash taught that the words "the good of the land of Egypt" in Genesis 45:18 referred to split beans (which were highly prized).

Rabbi Elazar read the words of Genesis 45:24, "See that you not fall out by the way," to mean that Joseph told his brothers not to become occupied in a discussion of legal matters, so that the discussion would not lead to an argument. The Gemara asked: Did not Rabbi Elai bar Berekhya say that if two Torah scholars are walking along the road and do not discuss Torah matters, they are worthy of being burned? The Gemara answered that Rabbi Elai bar Berekhya referred to studying by rote, by reviewing material one has already learned, which is permitted and even appropriate while traveling, while Rabbi Elazar referred to examining a law in depth, which would likely lead to conflict among scholars. Alternatively, a Baraita read the words of Genesis 45:24 to mean that Joseph told his brothers not to take long strides and should enter a city to spend the night before the sun has set. The Gemara taught that taking long strides harms a person’s eyesight, and that loss is not worth the time saved.

A Midrash told that when Joseph was young, he used to study Torah with Jacob. When Joseph's brothers told Jacob in Genesis 45:26 that Joseph was still alive, Jacob did not believe them, but he recalled the subject that Jacob and Joseph had been studying when they last studied together: the passage on the beheaded heifer (עֶגְלָה עֲרוּפָה, egla arufa) in Deuteronomy 21:1–8. Jacob told the brothers that if Joseph gave them a sign of which subject Joseph and Jacob had last studied together, then Jacob would believe them. Joseph too had remembered what subject they had been studying, so (as Genesis 45:21 reports) he sent Jacob wagons (עֲגָלוֹת, agalot) so that Jacob might know that the gift came from him. The Midrash thus concluded that wherever Joseph went he studied the Torah, just as his forebears did, even though the Torah had not yet been given.

=== Genesis chapter 46 ===
Rav Naḥman taught that when Jacob "took his journey with all that he had, and came to Beersheba" in Genesis 46:1, he went to cut down the cedars that Genesis 21:33 reports his grandfather Abraham had planted there.

A Midrash asked why, in Genesis 46:1, Jacob "offered sacrifices to the God of his father Isaac," and not to the God of Abraham and Isaac. Judah ben Pedayah, the nephew of Ben HaKappar, explained that when one encounters a teacher and the teacher's disciple walking on a road, one first greets the disciple and then the teacher. Rabbi Joḥanan said that the reason was because a person owes more honor to a parent than to a grandparent. Resh Lakish said that Jacob offered sacrifices (in thanksgiving) for the covenant with the ancestors (which Isaac had conveyed to Jacob with his blessing). Bar Kappara discussed the question with Rabbi Jose bar Patros. One of them said that Jacob declared that as Isaac had been eager for his food (for, as Genesis 25:28 reports, Isaac loved Esau because Esau brought Isaac venison), so Jacob was eager for his food (and thus was headed to Egypt to avoid the famine). The other explained that as Isaac had distinguished between his sons (as Genesis 25:28 reports, loving Esau more than Jacob), so Jacob would distinguish among his sons (going to Egypt for Joseph's account alone). But then Jacob noted on reconsideration that Isaac was responsible for only one soul, whereas Jacob was responsible for 70 souls. Rabbi Judan said that Jacob declared that Isaac blessed him with five blessings, and God correspondingly appeared five times to Jacob and blessed him (in Genesis 28:13–15, 31:3, 31:11–13, 35:1, and 35:9–12). Rabbi Judan also said that Jacob wanted to thank God for permitting Jacob to see the fulfillment of those blessings. And the blessing that was fulfilled was that of Genesis 27:29, "Let people serve you, and nations bow down to you," which was fulfilled with regard to Joseph. (And thus, Jacob mentioned Isaac then on going down to witness Joseph's greatness.) Rabbi Berekiah observed that God never unites God's Name with a living person (to say, for example, "I am the God of Jacob," while they are alive) except with those who are experiencing suffering. (And thus Jacob referred to the God of Isaac instead of the God of Jacob.) And Rabbi Berekiah also observed that Isaac did indeed experience suffering. The Rabbis said that we look upon Isaac as if his ashes were heaped in a pile on the altar. (And thus Jacob referred to Isaac to invoke the memory of Abraham's sacrifice of Isaac in Genesis 22 as if it had been carried out).

The Sifra cited Genesis 22:11, Genesis 46:2, Exodus 3:4, and 1 Samuel 3:10 for the proposition that when God called the name of a prophet twice, God expressed affection and sought to provoke a response.

The Pirke De-Rabbi Eliezer told that when Jacob heard that Joseph was alive, Jacob wondered whether he could forsake the land of his fathers, the land of his birth, the land of his fathers' sojournings, the land where the Divine Presence (שכינה, Shechinah) was, and go to an unclean land where there was no fear of Heaven. So God told Jacob (as reported in Genesis 46:3–4), "Do not fear . . . I will go down with you into Egypt, and I will also surely bring you up again."

Reading God's promise to Jacob in Genesis 46:2–4 to go down with him to Egypt, a Midrash taught that God's promise was to go with Jacob and with all who are righteous like Jacob. Thus, God promised to accompany all the righteous into exile, just as God accompanied Jacob. Similarly, the Sages read God's parallel use of the pronoun "I" (אָנֹכִי, Anochi, as opposed to אָני, Ani) in Genesis 46:4 and Exodus 3:12 to teach that just as with an "I" (אָנֹכִי, Anochi) Israel went down to Egypt, as Genesis 46:3 reports, "I (אָנֹכִי, Anochi) will go down with you into Egypt," also with an "I" (אָנֹכִי, Anochi) would God take Israel out, as Exodus 3:12 reports, "That I (אָנֹכִי, Anochi) have sent you." And the Sages said that the use of "I" (אָנֹכִי, Anochi) was also symbolic of the latter redemption, for with an "I" (אָנֹכִי, Anochi) will the Jews be healed and redeemed, as Malachi 3:23 says, "Behold, "I (אָנֹכִי, Anochi) will send you Elijah the prophet."

Rabbi Haggai said in Rabbi Isaac's name that God's promise to Jacob in Genesis 46:4, "I will surely bring you up again," only applied if "Joseph shall put his hand upon your eyes"—that is, take care of Jacob in life and in death.

Rabbi Ḥama bar Ḥanina cited Genesis 46:4, "I will go down with you into Egypt, and I will also surely bring you up again (גַם-עָלֹה, gam aloh)," for the proposition that if one sees a camel (גָּמָל, gamal) in a dream, Heaven had decreed death for the dreamer, but had delivered the dreamer from that fate. Rav Naḥman bar Isaac, however, derives the proposition from 2 Samuel 12:13: "The Lord also (גַּם, gam) has put away your sin, you shall not die."

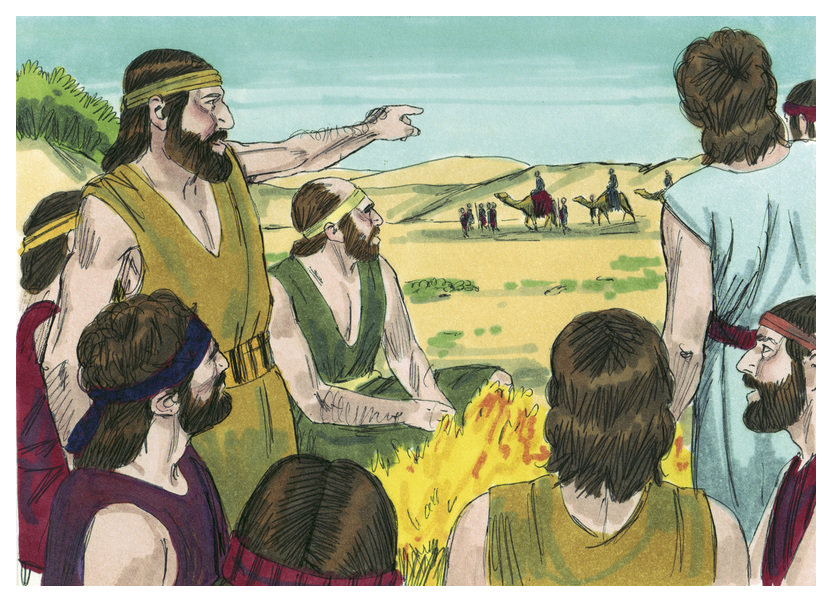
Judah said, "Let us sell him to the Ishmaelites." (Genesis 37:27) (1984 illustration by Jim Padgett, courtesy of Distant Shores Media/Sweet Publishing)

A Midrash explained Judah's sons' death, reported in Genesis 46:12, as the result of Judah's failure to follow through in saving Joseph. Reading Deuteronomy 30:11–14, "For this commandment that I command you this day . . . is very near to you, in your mouth, and in your heart," a Midrash interpreted "heart" and "mouth" to symbolize the beginning and end of fulfilling a precept and thus read Deuteronomy 30:11–14 as an exhortation to complete a good deed once started. Thus Rabbi Ḥiyya bar Abba taught that if one begins a precept and does not complete it, the result will be that he will bury his wife and children. The Midrash cited as support for this proposition the experience of Judah, who began a precept and did not complete it. When Joseph came to his brothers and they sought to kill him, as Joseph's brothers said in Genesis 37:20, "Come now therefore, and let us slay him," Judah did not let them, saying in Genesis 37:26, "What profit is it if we slay our brother?" and they listened to him, for he was their leader. And had Judah called for Joseph's brothers to restore Joseph to their father, they would have listened to him then, as well. Thus because Judah began a precept (the good deed toward Joseph) and did not complete it, he buried his wife and two sons, as Genesis 38:12 reports, "Shua's daughter, the wife of Judah, died," and Genesis 46:12 further reports, "Er and Onan died in the land of Canaan."

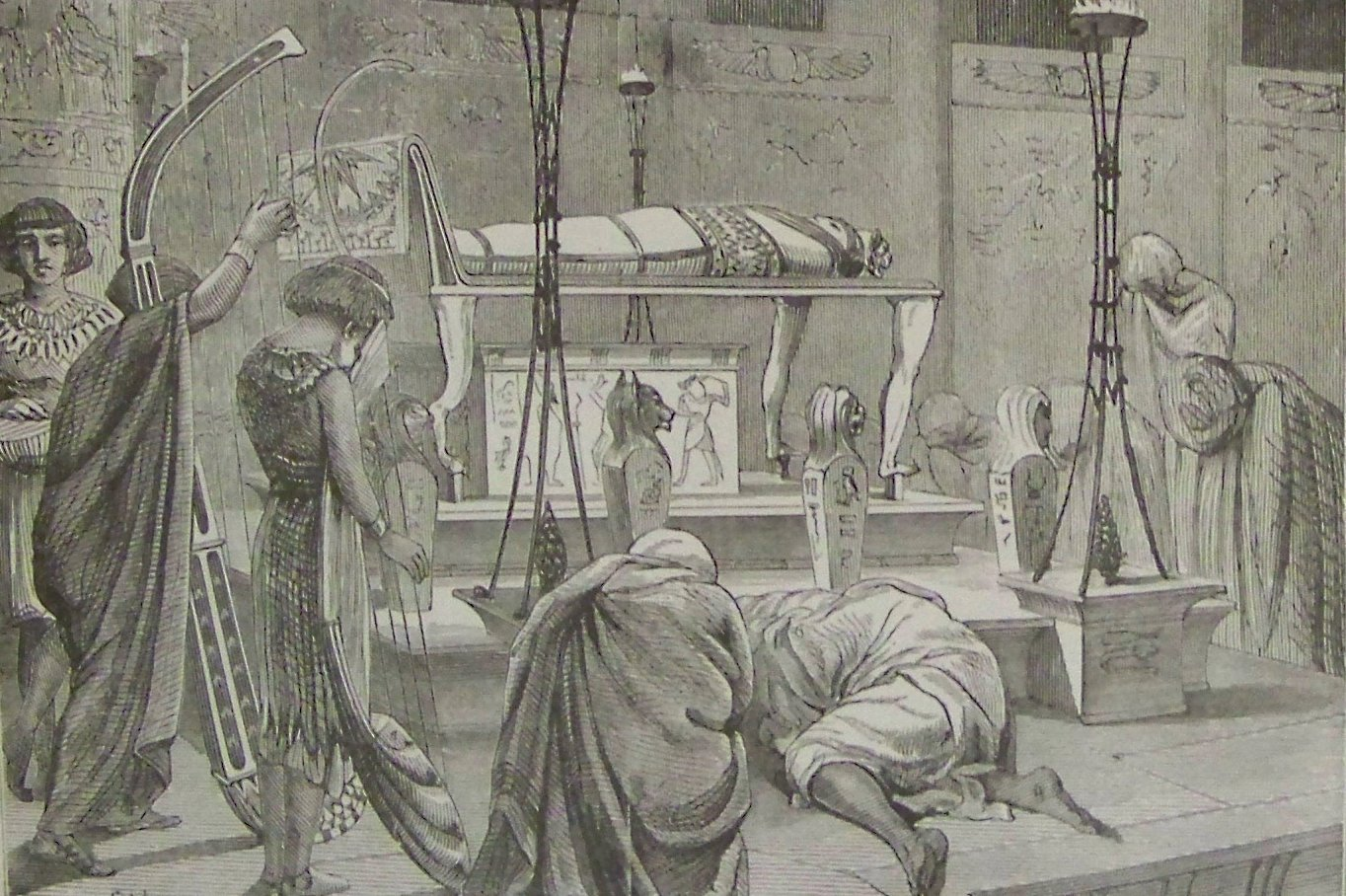
Burying the Body of Joseph (illustration from the 1890 Holman Bible)

Rabbi Zadok noted that Genesis 46:15 attributed sons to Leah but attributed the daughter Dinah to Jacob, and deduced that the verse thus supported the proposition that if the woman emits her egg first she will bear a son and if the man emits his semen first she will bear a girl.

A Baraita taught that the Serah the daughter of Asher mentioned in Genesis 46:17 and Numbers 26:46 survived from the time Israel went down to Egypt to the time of the wandering in the Wilderness. The Gemara taught that Moses went to her to ask where the Egyptians had buried Joseph. She told him that the Egyptians had made a metal coffin for Joseph. The Egyptians set the coffin in the Nile so that its waters would be blessed. Moses went to the bank of the Nile and called to Joseph that the time had arrived for God to deliver the Israelites, and the oath that Joseph had imposed upon the children of Israel in Genesis 50:25 had reached its time of fulfillment. Moses called on Joseph to show himself, and Joseph's coffin immediately rose to the surface of the water.

Similarly, a Midrash taught that Serah (mentioned in Genesis 46:17) conveyed to the Israelites a secret password handed down from Jacob so that they would recognize their deliverer. The Midrash told that when (as Exodus 4:30 reports) "Aaron spoke all the words" to the Israelite people, "And the people believed" (as Exodus 4:31 reports), they did not believe only because they had seen the signs. Rather, (as Exodus 4:31 reports), "They heard that the Lord had visited"—they believed because they heard, not because they saw the signs. What made them believe was the sign of God's visitation that God communicated to them through a tradition from Jacob, which Jacob handed down to Joseph, Joseph to his brothers, and Asher, the son of Jacob, handed down to his daughter Serah, who was still alive at the time of Moses and Aaron. Asher told Serah that any redeemer who would come and say the password to the Israelites would be their true deliverer. So when Moses came and said the password, the people believed him at once.

Rabbi Samuel ben Naḥman taught that Benjamin's son's names, as listed in Genesis 46:21, reflected Benjamin's loss of Joseph. The name Bela signified that Benjamin's brother was swallowed up (nit-bala) from him; Becher signified that he was a firstborn (bechor); Ashbel signified that he was taken away captive (nishbah); Gera signified that he became a stranger (ger) in a strange country; Naaman signified that his actions were seemly (na'im) and pleasant (ne'im-im); Ehi signified that he indeed was "my brother" (ahi); Rosh signified that he was Benjamin's superior (rosh); Muppim signified that he was exceedingly attractive (yafeh ‘ad me'od) in all matters; and Huppim signified that Benjamin did not see his marriage-canopy (huppah) and he did not see Benjamin's; and Ard signified that he was like a rose-bloom (ward).

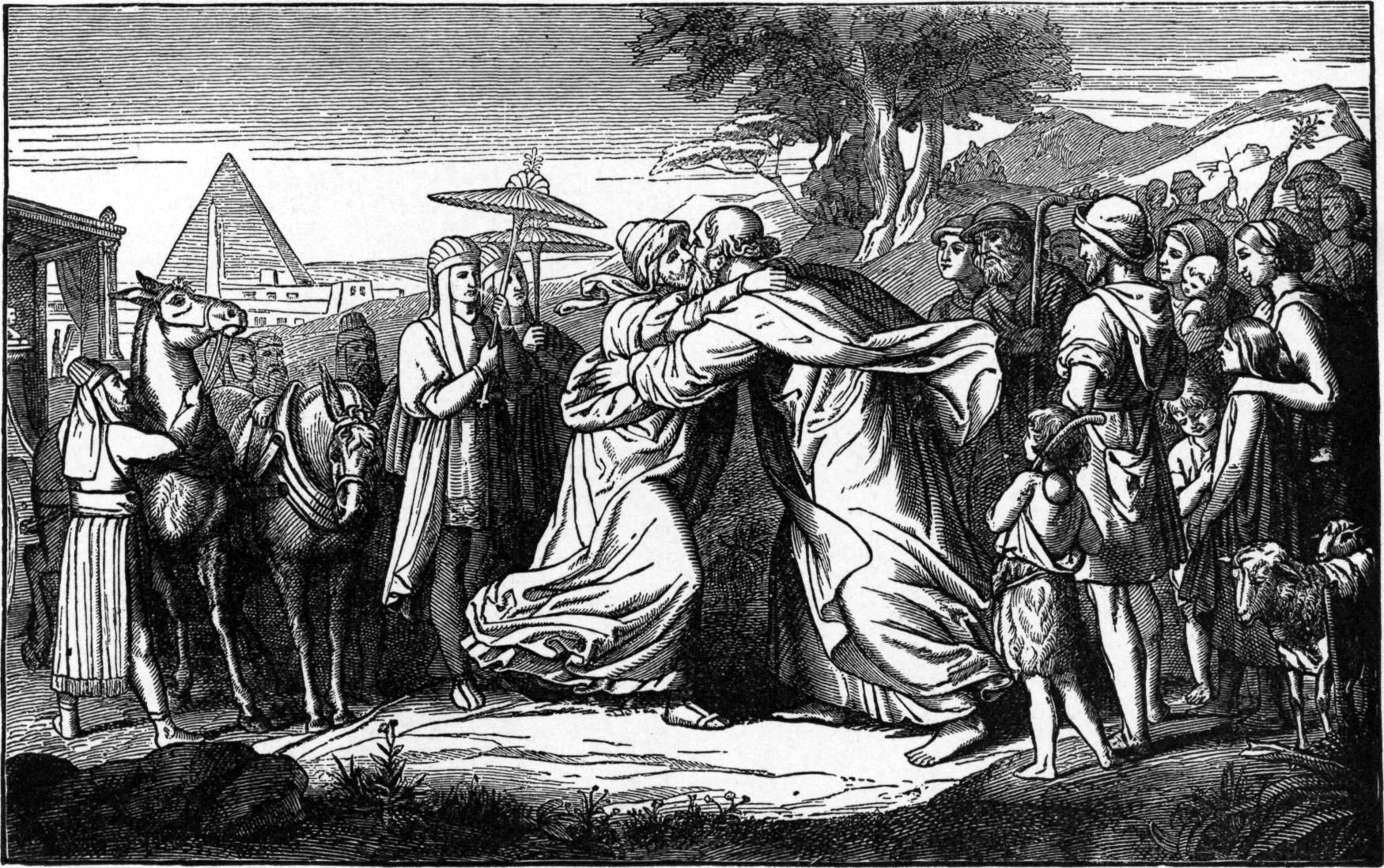
Joseph Kisses Jacob (illustration from the 1897 Bible Pictures and What They Teach Us by Charles Foster)

Abaye cited the listing for Dan in Genesis 46:23 to demonstrate that sometimes texts refer to "sons" in the plural when they mean a single son. But Rava suggested perhaps the word "Hushim" in Genesis 46:23 was not a name but, as taught by the Academy of Hezekiah, the word "clusters" or "leaves," thus signifying that Dan's sons were as numerous as the leaves of a reed. Rava found, however, support in Numbers 26:8 and 1 Chronicles 2:8 for the proposition that sometimes texts refer to "sons" when they mean a single son.

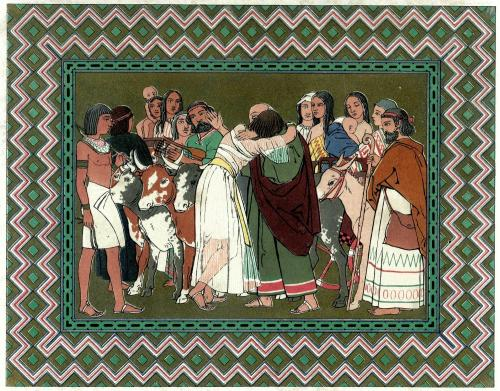
He fell upon his neck and wept on his neck a good while. (illustration by Owen Jones from the 1869 "The History of Joseph and His Brethren")

Abba Ḥalifa of Keruya asked Rabbi Ḥiyya bar Abba why Genesis 46:27 reported that 70 people from Jacob's household came to Egypt, while Genesis 46:8–27 enumerated only 69 individuals. Rabbi Ḥiyya first argued that the Hebrew word et preceding Dinah in Genesis 46:15 indicated that Dinah had a twin sister, and the twin brought the total to 70. But Abba Ḥalifa responded that if that were so, then the parallel language of Genesis 43:29 would indicate that Benjamin also had a twin sister. Rabbi Ḥiyya then revealed his real explanation, which he called "a precious pearl": Rabbi Ḥama bar Ḥanina taught that the seventieth person was Moses' mother Jochebed, who was conceived on the way from Canaan to Egypt and born as Jacob's family passed between the city walls as they entered Egypt, for Numbers 26:59 reported that Jochebed "was born to Levi in Egypt," implying that her conception was not in Egypt.

Rabbi Neḥemiah read the words "to show" in Genesis 46:28 as "to teach," and thus inferred that Jacob sent Judah to prepare an academy for him in Egypt where he would teach Torah and where the brothers would read Torah.

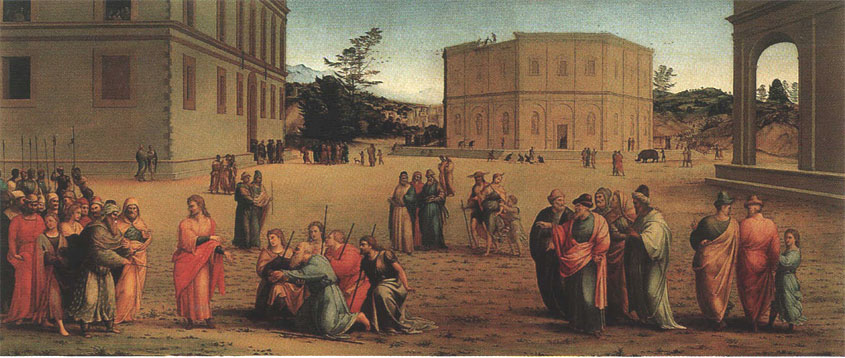
Joseph Presents His Father and Brothers to the Pharaoh (1515 painting by Francesco Granacci)

=== Genesis chapter 47 ===
The Midrash and the Talmud differed over which five brothers Joseph presented to Pharaoh in Genesis 47:2. The Midrash read the word “from among” (מִקְצֵה, mikzeh) in Genesis 47:2, “And from among (מִקְצֵה, mikzeh) his brethren he took five men,” to mean “from the end,” implying inferiority. The Midrash thus concluded that they were not the strongest of the brothers, and named them as Reuben, Simeon, Levi, Benjamin, and Issachar. The Midrash explained that Joseph took these five brothers, because he reasoned that if he presented the strongest to Pharaoh, then Pharaoh would on make them his warriors. Therefore, Joseph presented these five, who were not mighty men. The Midrash taught that we know that they were not strong from the blessing of Moses in Deuteronomy 33:2–29, where every brother whose name Moses repeated in his blessing was mighty, while every brother whose name Moses did not repeat was not mighty. Judah, whose name he repeated, was mighty, for Deuteronomy 33:7 says, "And this for Judah, and he said: 'Hear, Lord, the voice of Judah'"; therefore, Joseph did not present him to Pharaoh. Likewise Naphtali, as Deuteronomy 33:23 says, "And of Naphtali he said: 'O Naphtali, satisfied with favor.'" Likewise, Asher, of whom Deuteronomy 33:24 says, "And of Asher he said: 'Blessed be Asher above sons.'" Likewise, Dan, of whom Deuteronomy 33:22 says, "And of Dan he said: 'Dan is a lion's whelp.'" Zebulun too, of whom Deuteronomy 33:18 says, "And of Zebulun he said: 'Rejoice, Zebulun, in your going out.'" Gad too, of whom Deuteronomy 33:20 says, "And of Gad he said: 'Blessed be He that enlarges Gad.'" Therefore, Joseph did not present them to Pharaoh. But the others, whose names were not repeated, were not mighty, therefore he presented them to Pharaoh. In the Babylonian Talmud, however, Rava asked Rabbah bar Mari who the five were. Rabbah bar Mari replied that Rabbi Joḥanan said that they were those whose names were repeated in the Farewell of Moses, Deuteronomy 33:2–29 (and thus the mightier of the brothers). Besides Judah, the five whose names Moses repeated were Dan, Zebulun, Gad, Asher and Naphtali. Explaining why Moses repeated Judah’s name in Deuteronomy 33:7, but Joseph nonetheless excluded him from the five, Rabbah bar Mari explained that Moses repeated Judah’s name for a different purpose, which Rabbi Samuel bar Naḥmani recounted that Rabbi Joḥanan said. Rabbi Joḥanan interpreted the words of Deuteronomy 33:6–7, "Let Reuben live and not die, in that his men become few, and this is for Judah," to teach that during the 40 years that the Israelites were in the wilderness, the bones of Judah rolled around detached in the coffin that conveyed the bones of the heads of the tribes from Egypt to the Promised Land along with Joseph's remains. But then Moses solicited God for mercy by noting that Judah brought Reuben to confess his own sin in Genesis 35:22 and 49:4 (lying with Bilhah) by himself making public confession in Genesis 38:26 (when Judah admitted that Tamar was more righteous than he was). Therefore, in Deuteronomy 33:7, Moses exhorted God: "Hear Lord the voice of Judah!" Thereupon God fitted each of Judah's limbs into its original place as one whole skeleton. Judah was, however, not permitted to ascend to the heavenly academy, until Moses said in Deuteronomy 33:7, "And bring him in to his people." As, however, Judah still did not know what the Rabbis were saying in that assembly and was thus unable to argue with the Rabbis on matters of the law, Moses said in Deuteronomy 33:7, "His hands shall contend for him!" As again he was unable to conclude legal discussions in accordance with the Law, Moses said in Deuteronomy 33:7, "You shall be a help against his adversaries!"

Rabbi Jose deduced from Genesis 47:6 that the Egyptians befriended the Israelites only for their own benefit. Rabbi Jose noted, however, that the law of Deuteronomy 23:8 nonetheless rewarded the Egyptians for their hospitality. Rabbi Jose concluded that if Providence thus rewarded one with mixed motives, Providence will reward even more one who selflessly shows hospitality to a scholar.

Rabbi Ahawa the son of Rabbi Ze'ira taught that just as lettuce is sweet at the beginning (in the leaf) and bitter at the end (in the stalk), so were the Egyptians sweet to the Israelites at the beginning and bitter at the end. The Egyptians were sweet at the beginning, as Genesis 47:6 reports that Pharaoh told Joseph, "The land of Egypt is before you; have your father and brethren dwell in the best of the land." And the Egyptians were bitter at the end, as Exodus 1:14 reports, "And they (the Egyptians) made their (the Israelites') lives bitter."

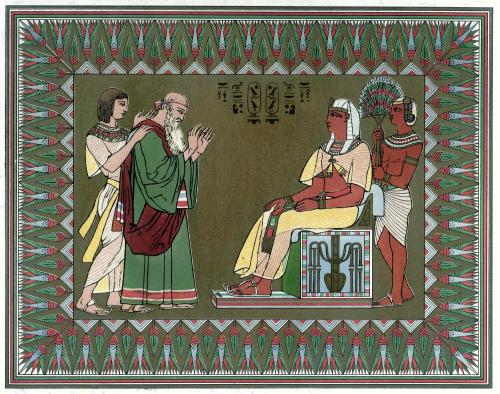
Jacob blessed Pharaoh. (illustration by Owen Jones from the 1869 "The History of Joseph and His Brethren")

A Midrash read the words of Genesis 47:7 and 47:10, "And Jacob blessed Pharaoh," to mean that Jacob blessed Pharaoh that the famine should come to an end. Similarly, Rabbi Berekiah the priest taught that when Jacob came to Pharaoh, he did not leave him before blessing him, as Genesis 47:10 says, "And Jacob blessed Pharaoh." And the blessing that he gave was the wish that the Nile might rise to his feet (to irrigate the land).

A Midrash taught that Mordecai had pity on the unbeliever King of Persia, Ahasuerus. In explanation, Rabbi Judah quoted Psalm 119:100 to say, "From my elders I receive understanding." Rabbi Judah taught that Mordecai reasoned that Jacob blessed Pharaoh, as Genesis 47:7 says, "And Jacob blessed Pharaoh." And Joseph revealed his dreams to him, and Daniel revealed Nebuchadnezzar's dreams to him. So similarly Mordecai could help Ahasuerus, and hence (as Esther 2:22 reports), "he told it to Esther the queen."

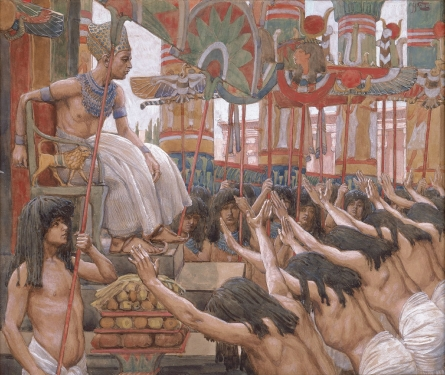
Joseph Dwells in Egypt (watercolor circa 1896–1902 by James Tissot)

Rav Judah in the name of Samuel deduced from Genesis 47:14 that Joseph gathered in and brought to Egypt all the gold and silver in the world. The Gemara noted that Genesis 47:14 says: "And Joseph gathered up all the money that was found in the land of Egypt, and in the land of Canaan," and thus spoke about the wealth of only Egypt and Canaan. The Gemara found support for the proposition that Joseph collected the wealth of other countries from Genesis 41:57, which states: "And all the countries came to Egypt to Joseph to buy corn." The Gemara deduced from the words "and they despoiled the Egyptians" in Exodus 12:36 that when the Israelites left Egypt, they carried that wealth away with them. The Gemara then taught that the wealth lay in Israel until the time of King Rehoboam, when King Shishak of Egypt seized it from Rehoboam, as 1 Kings 14:25–26 reports: "And it came to pass in the fifth year of king Rehoboam, that Shishak king of Egypt came up against Jerusalem; and he took away the treasures of the house of the Lord, and the treasures of the king's house."

The Mekhilta of Rabbi Ishmael, the Mekhilta of Rabbi Simeon, and the Tanna Devei Eliyahu praised Joseph, as Genesis 47:14 reports that he "brought the money into Pharaoh's house" and did not steal any of it.

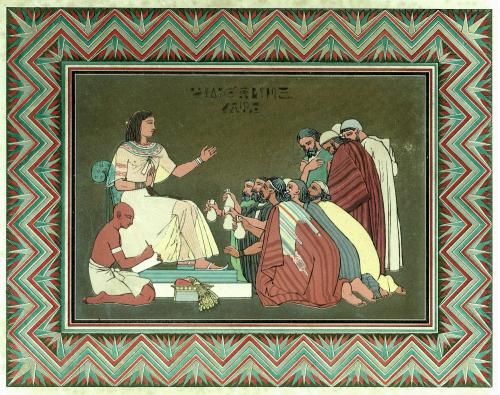
Joseph was the governor over the land. (illustration by Owen Jones from the 1869 "The History of Joseph and His Brethren")

Resh Lakish deduced from the words "and as for the [Egyptian] people, he [Joseph] removed them city by city" in Genesis 47:21 that Joseph exiled the Egyptians from their home cities so that they could not later berate the Hebrews for being exiles.

Reading the words of Genesis 47:21, "He [Joseph] removed them city by city," a Midrash taught that similarly, the Israelites were not forced into exile from the Land of Israel until the Assyrian king Sennacherib had mixed up the whole world, as Isaiah 10:13 quotes Sennacherib saying, "I have removed the bounds of the peoples, and have robbed their treasures, and have brought down as one mighty the inhabitants."

Rabbi Abba ben Kahana taught that Joseph inspired the Egyptians with a longing to be circumcised and convert to Judaism. Rabbi Samuel read the words "You have saved our lives" in Genesis 47:26 to mean that Joseph had given them life both in this world and in the World to Come, through acceptance of Judaism.

A Midrash noted the difference in wording between Genesis 47:27, which says of the Israelites in Goshen that "they got possessions therein," and Leviticus 14:34, which says of the Israelites in Canaan, "When you come into the land of Canaan, which I gave you for a possession." The Midrash read Genesis 47:27 to read, "and they were taken in possession by it." The Midrash thus taught that in the case of Goshen, the land seized the Israelites, so that their bond might be exacted and so as to bring about God's declaration to Abraham in Genesis 15:13 that the Egyptians would afflict the Israelites for 400 years. But the Midrash read Leviticus 14:34 to teach the Israelites that if they were worthy, the Land of Israel would be an eternal possession, but if not, they would be banished from it.

Rabbi Joḥanan taught that wherever Scripture uses the term "And he abode" (וַיֵּשֶׁב, vayeshev), as it does in Genesis 47:27, it presages trouble. Thus, in Numbers 25:1, "And Israel abode in Shittim" is followed by "and the people began to commit whoredom with the daughters of Moab." In Genesis 37:1, "And Jacob dwelt in the land where his father was a stranger, in the land of Canaan," is followed by Genesis 37:3, "and Joseph brought to his father their evil report." In Genesis 47:27, "And Israel dwelt in the land of Egypt, in the country of Goshen," is followed by Genesis 47:29, "And the time drew near that Israel must die." In 1 Kings 5:5, "And Judah and Israel dwelt safely, every man under his vine and under his fig tree," is followed by 1 Kings 11:14, "And the Lord stirred up an adversary unto Solomon, Hadad the Edomite; he was the king's seed in Edom."

== In medieval Jewish interpretation ==
The parashah is discussed in these medieval Jewish sources:

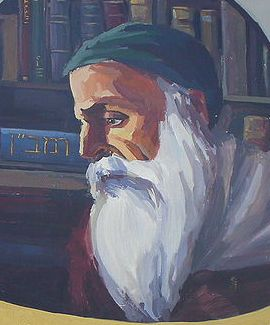
Naḥmanides

=== Genesis chapter 47 ===
Nachmanides taught that Joseph did not show favoritism to his own family in distributing food during the famine. Naḥmanides read Genesis 47:12, “And Joseph sustained his father, and his brethren, and all his father's household, with bread, according to the want of their little ones,” to mean that Joseph gave his own family what they needed and no more.

Reading Genesis 47:21, "[Joseph] removed the population to cities," Rashbam commented, "Just as Sennacherib did," citing 2 Kings 18:32, likening Joseph to a hated Assyrian king who besieged Jerusalem.

== In modern interpretation ==
The parashah is discussed in these modern sources:

=== Genesis chapters 37–50 ===
Donald A. Seybold of Purdue University schematized the Joseph narrative in the chart below, finding analogous relationships in each of Joseph's households.

The Joseph Narrative
	At Home		Potiphar's House		Prison		Pharaoh's Court
	Genesis 37:1–36	Genesis 37:3–33	Genesis 39:1–20	Genesis 39:12–41:14	Genesis 39:20–41:14	Genesis 41:14–50:26	Genesis 41:1–50:26
Ruler	Jacob		Potiphar		Prison-keeper		Pharaoh
Deputy	Joseph		Joseph		Joseph		Joseph
Other "Subjects"	Brothers		Servants		Prisoners		Citizens
Symbols of Position and Transition		Long Sleeved Robe		Cloak		Shaved and Changed Clothes	
Symbols of Ambiguity and Paradox		Pit		Prison		Egypt	

Ephraim Speiser argued that in spite of its surface unity, the Joseph story, on closer scrutiny, yields two parallel strands similar in general outline, yet markedly different in detail. The Jahwist’s version employed the Tetragrammaton and the name “Israel.” In that version, Judah persuaded his brothers not to kill Joseph but sell him instead to Ishmaelites, who disposed of him in Egypt to an unnamed official. Joseph's new master promoted him to the position of chief retainer. When the brothers were on their way home from their first mission to Egypt with grain, they opened their bags at a night stop and were shocked to find the payment for their purchases. Judah prevailed on his father to let Benjamin accompany them on a second journey to Egypt. Judah finally convinced Joseph that the brothers had really reformed. Joseph invited Israel to settle with his family in Goshen. The Elohist’s parallel account, in contrast, consistently used the names “Elohim” and “Jacob.” Reuben—not Judah—saved Joseph from his brothers; Joseph was left in an empty cistern, where he was picked up, unbeknown to the brothers, by Midianites; they—not the Ishmaelites—sold Joseph as a slave to an Egyptian named Potiphar. In that lowly position, Joseph served—not supervised—the other prisoners. The brothers opened their sacks—not bags—at home in Canaan—not at an encampment along the way. Reuben—not Judah—gave Jacob—not Israel—his personal guarantee of Benjamin's safe return. Pharaoh—not Joseph—invited Jacob and his family to settle in Egypt—not just Goshen. Speiser concluded that the Joseph story can thus be traced back to two once separate, though now intertwined, accounts.

John Kselman noted that as in the Jacob cycle that precedes it, the Joseph narrative begins with the deception of a father by his offspring through an article of clothing; the deception leads to the separation of brothers for 20 years; and the climax of the story comes with the reconciliation of estranged brothers and the abatement of family strife. Kselman reported that recent scholarship points to authorship of the Joseph narrative in the Solomonic era, citing Solomon's marriage to Pharaoh's daughter (reported in 1 Kings 9:16) as indicative of that era as one of amicable political and commercial relations between Egypt and Israel, thus explaining the positive attitude of the Joseph narrative to Egypt, Pharaoh, and Egyptians. Kselman argued that the Joseph narrative was thus not part of the Jahwist's work, but an independent literary work.

Gary Rendsburg noted that Genesis often repeats the motif of the younger son. God favored Abel over Cain in Genesis 4; Isaac superseded Ishmael in Genesis 16–21; Jacob superseded Esau in Genesis 25–27; Judah (fourth among Jacob's sons, last of the original set born to Leah) and Joseph (eleventh in line) superseded their older brothers in Genesis 37–50; Perez superseded Zerah in Genesis 38 and Ruth 4; and Ephraim superseded Manasseh in Genesis 48. Rendsburg explained Genesis's interest with this motif by recalling that David was the youngest of Jesse's seven sons (see 1 Samuel 16), and Solomon was among the youngest, if not the youngest, of David's sons (see 2 Samuel 5:13–16). The issue of who among David's many sons would succeed him dominates the Succession Narrative in 2 Samuel 13 through 1 Kings 2. Amnon was the firstborn, but was killed by his brother Absalom (David’s third son) in 2 Samuel 13:29. After Absalom rebelled, David's general Joab killed him in 2 Samuel 18:14–15. The two remaining candidates were Adonijah (David's fourth son) and Solomon, and although Adonijah was older (and once claimed the throne when David was old and feeble in 1 Kings 1), Solomon won out. Rendsburg argued that even though firstborn royal succession was the norm in the ancient Near East, the authors of Genesis justified Solomonic rule by imbedding the notion of ultimogeniture into Genesis’s national epic. An Israelite could thus not criticize David’s selection of Solomon to succeed him as king over Israel, because Genesis reported that God had favored younger sons since Abel and blessed younger sons of Israel—Isaac, Jacob, Judah, Joseph, Perez, and Ephraim—since the inception of the covenant. More generally, Rendsburg concluded that royal scribes living in Jerusalem during the reigns of David and Solomon in the tenth century BCE were responsible for Genesis; their ultimate goal was to justify the monarchy in general, and the kingship of David and Solomon in particular; and Genesis thus appears as a piece of political propaganda.

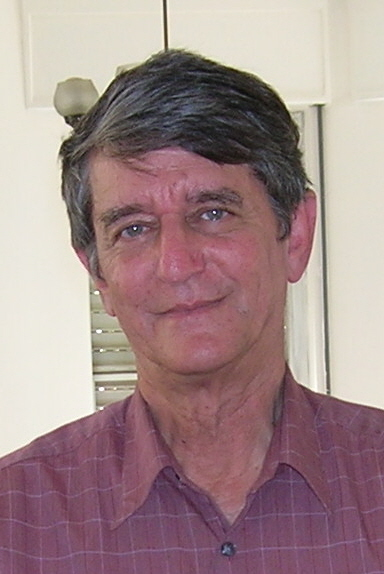
Kugel

Calling it “too good a story,” James Kugel reported that modern interpreters contrast the full-fledged tale of the Joseph story with the schematic narratives of other Genesis figures and conclude that the Joseph story reads more like a work of fiction than history. Donald Redford and other scholars following him suspected that behind the Joseph story stood an altogether invented Egyptian or Canaanite tale that was popular on its own before an editor changed the main characters to Jacob and his sons. These scholars argue that the original story told of a family of brothers in which the father spoiled the youngest, and the oldest brother, who had his own privileged status, intervened to try to save the youngest when his other brothers threatened him. In support of this theory, scholars have pointed to the description of Joseph (rather than Benjamin) in Genesis 37:3 as if he were Jacob's youngest son, Joseph's and Jacob's references to Joseph's mother (as if Rachel were still alive) in Joseph's prophetic dream in Genesis 37:9–10, and the role of the oldest brother Reuben intervening for Joseph in Genesis 37:21–22, 42:22, and 42:37. Scholars theorize that when the editor first mechanically put Reuben in the role of the oldest, but as the tribe of Reuben had virtually disappeared and the audience for the story were principally descendants of Judah, Judah was given the role of spokesman and hero in the end.

Von Rad and scholars following him noted that the Joseph story bears the particular signatures of ancient Near Eastern wisdom literature. The wisdom ideology maintained that a Divine plan underlay all of reality, so that everything unfolds in accordance with a preestablished pattern—precisely what Joseph says to his brothers in Genesis 44:5 and 50:20. Joseph is the only one of Israel's ancestors whom the Torah (in Genesis 41:39) calls "wise" (חָכָם, chacham)—the same word as "sage" in Hebrew. Specialties of ancient Near Eastern sages included advising the king and interpreting dreams and other signs—just as Joseph did. Joseph displayed the cardinal sagely virtue of patience, which sages had because they believed that everything happens according to the Divine plan and would turn out for the best. Joseph thus looks like the model of an ancient Near Eastern sage, and the Joseph story looks like a didactic tale designed to teach the basic ideology of wisdom.

George Coats argued that the Joseph narrative is a literary device constructed to carry the children of Israel from Canaan to Egypt, to link preexisting stories of ancestral promises in Canaan to an Exodus narrative of oppression in and liberation from Egypt. Coats described the two principal goals of the Joseph story as (1) to describe reconciliation in a broken family despite the lack of merit of any of its members, and (2) to describe the characteristics of an ideal administrator.

=== Genesis chapter 45 ===
Commenting on Genesis 45:5–8 and 50:19–20, Walter Brueggemann wrote that the Joseph story's theme concerns God's hidden and decisive power, which works in, through, and sometimes against human power. Calling this either providence or predestination, Brueggemann argued that God thus worked out God's purpose through and in spite of Egypt, and through and in spite of Joseph and his brothers.

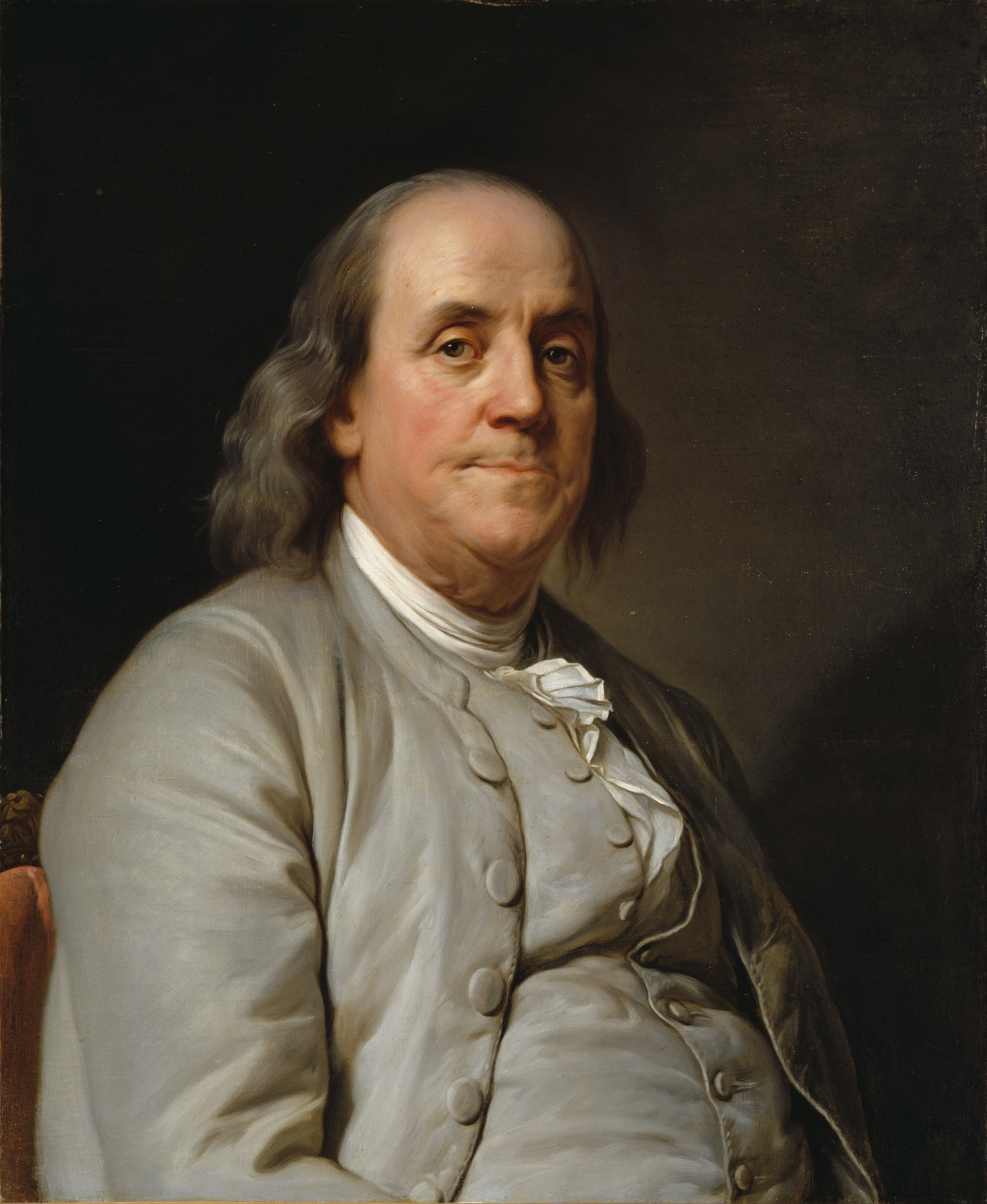
Franklin

=== Genesis chapter 47 ===
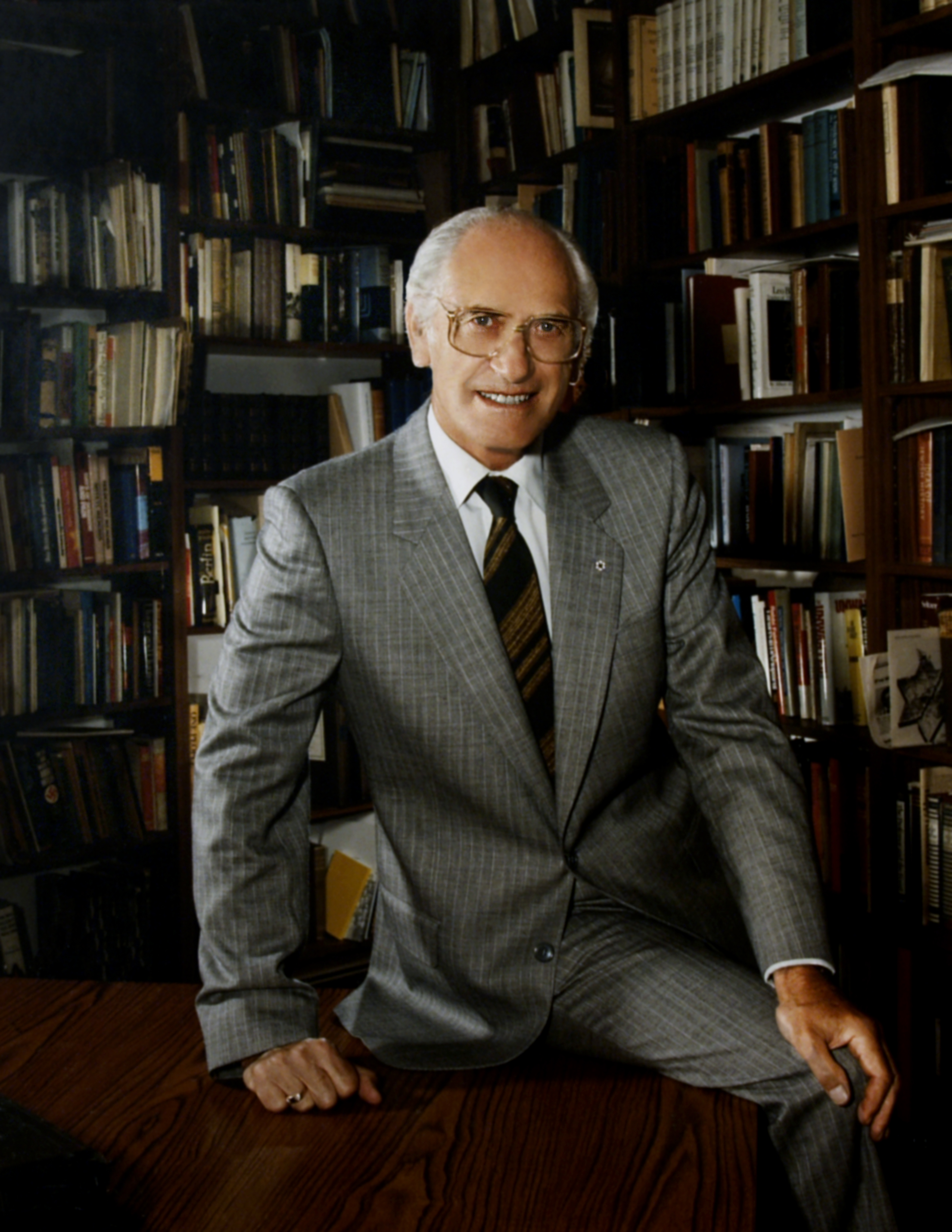
Plaut

Alluding to the policies implemented by Joseph in Genesis 47:14–19, on June 2, 1787, Benjamin Franklin told the Constitutional Convention: “There is scarce a king in a hundred who would not, if he could, follow the example of pharaoh, get first all the peoples money, then all their lands, and then make them and their children servants for ever.”

Samuel Driver wrote that Joseph's famine relief measures in Genesis 47:13–27 reflected poorly on Joseph's character, as to seize the surplus produce and then compel the Egyptians to impoverish themselves to buy it back was not consistent with justice and equity. Von Rad and Gunther Plaut argued that readers should not judge Joseph by modern opinion, but should place his actions in context. Von Rad and Nahum Sarna cited higher Babylonian charges for comparable loans. Hillel Millgram, however, citing an ancient Egyptian tomb declaration, argued that Joseph comes off poorly even by ancient Egyptian ethical standards.

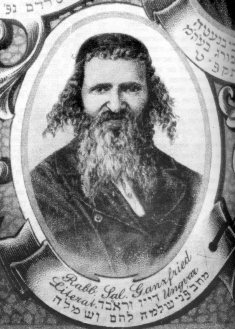
Shlomo Ganzfried, editor of the Kitzur Shulchan Aruch

== Commandments ==
According to Maimonides and Sefer ha-Chinuch, there are no commandments in the parashah.

Reading Genesis 46:4, "and Joseph shall pass his hand over your eyes," the Kitzur Shulchan Aruch taught that one should close the eyes of a dead person at death. Following the example of Joseph, if a child of the deceased is present, the deceased's child should do it, giving preference to the firstborn son.

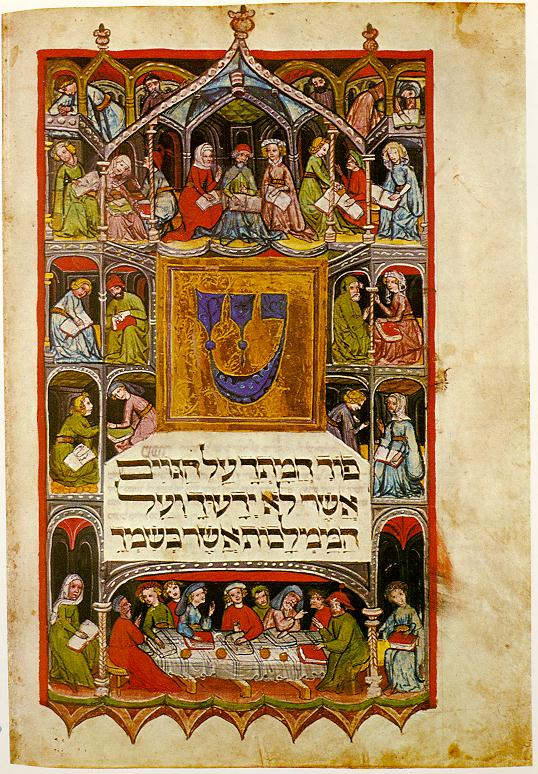
A page from a 14th-century German Haggadah

== In the liturgy ==
Kingdom of Judah (light green) and Kingdom of Israel (dark green) circa 830 B.C.E.

The Passover Haggadah, in the magid section of the Seder, reports that Israel "went down to Egypt—forced to do so by the word [of God]," and some commentators explain that this statement refers to God's reassurance to Jacob in Genesis 46:3–4 to "fear not to go down into Egypt; for I will there make of you a great nation. I will go down with you into Egypt." Shortly thereafter, the Haggadah quotes Genesis 47:4 for the proposition that Israel did not go down to Egypt to settle, but only to stay temporarily.

== Haftarah ==
A haftarah is a text selected from the books of Nevi'im ("The Prophets") that is read publicly in the synagogue after the reading of the Torah on Sabbath and holiday mornings. The haftarah usually has a thematic link to the Torah reading that precedes it.

The specific text read following Parashah Vayigash varies according to different traditions within Judaism. In general, the haftarah for the parashah is Ezekiel 37:15–28.

=== Summary ===
God's word came to Ezekiel, telling him to write on one stick "For Judah, and for the children of Israel his companions," to write on a second stick "For Joseph, the stick of Ephraim, and of all the house of Israel his companions," and to join the two sticks together into one stick to hold in his hand. When people would ask him what he meant by these sticks, he was to tell them that God said that God would take the stick of Joseph, which was in the hand of Ephraim, and the tribes of Israel his companions, and put them together with the stick of Judah, and make them one stick in God's hand. Ezekiel was to hold the sticks in his hand for people to see, telling them that God said that God would gather the children of Israel from among the nations, wherever they had gone, bring them into their own land, and make them one nation with one king, no longer two nations with two kings. No longer would they defile themselves with idols or transgressions, but God would save them and cleanse them, so that they would be God's people, and God would be their God. David would be king over them, and they would have one shepherd and observe God's statutes. They and their children, and their children's children forever, would dwell in the land that God had given Jacob, where their fathers had dwelt, and David would be their prince forever. God would make an everlasting covenant of peace with them, multiply them, and set God's sanctuary in the midst of them forever. God's dwelling-place would be over them, God would be their God, and they would be God's people. And the nations would know that God sanctified Israel, when God's sanctuary would be in their midst forever.

=== Connection to the Parashah ===
The parashah and the haftarah both tell stories of the reconciliation of Jacob's progeny. The parashah and the haftarah both tell of the relationship of Judah and Joseph, in the parashah as individuals, and in the haftarah as representatives for the Kingdom of Judah and the Kingdom of Israel.
